= Godley Reservoir =

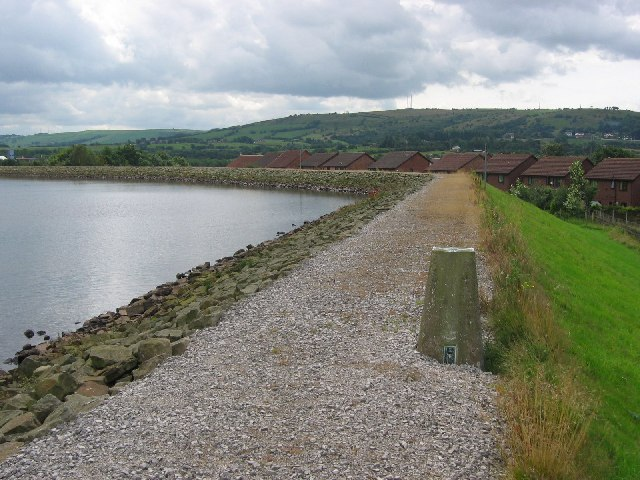
- Godley Reservoir. Trig on a dam. Looking towards Werneth Low.

- Location within Greater Manchester
- Location: Godley, Greater Manchester, England
- Coordinates: 53°27′17″N 2°03′12″W
- Type: Service reservoir
- Primary inflows: Mottram Tunnel, Arnfield Reservoir, Rhodeswood Reservoir
- Primary outflows: Audenshaw Service Reservoirs, 30" trunk water main.
- Basin countries: United Kingdom
- Surface area: 15 acres (6.1 ha)
- Average depth: 21 ft (6.4 m)
- Water volume: 280 million litres (62 million gallons)
- Surface elevation: 478 ft (146 m)

The Godley Reservoir is a reservoir in Godley, Hyde, Greater Manchester. It was completed in 1851, as a critical part of the Longdendale Chain project that brings fresh water to Manchester.

The Manchester Corporation Waterworks Act 1847 (10 & 11 Vict. c. cciii) gave permission for the construction of the Woodhead, Hollingworth and Arnfield reservoirs, and the construction of a masonry aqueduct to convey drinking water from Arnfield and Hollingworth to a service reservoir at Godley.

Water was captured from the River Etherow and stored in the great reservoirs and then flowed through the six-foot bore Mottram Tunnel to Godley. At Godley the water was filtered by passing it through straining frames made of oak and fine wires. It was chlorinated to remove bacteria and then entered Manchester's water distribution network. This method was successfully used until the early 1960s, when additional treatment works were built at Arnfield and Godley.

In 2016 United Utilities completed the construction of a 3 MW 45,500-square-metre (11.2-acre) floating solar farm, the second and largest of its type in the UK, on the reservoir.
