= List of mills in Longdendale and Glossopdale =

Mills in Glossop, Derbyshire and Tintwistle, Cheshire, England. The first mills were built in the 1760s, and were powered by the water of the River Etherow and its tributaries. As the industry developed, the mills changed hands, were demolished, were converted to use steam, or consolidated into larger units. They changed their names and their functions. Water-powered mills were smaller than the later steam-powered mills found in Greater Manchester.

== The mills ==
| Name | Owner | Location | Built | Demolished | Served (Years) |
|---|---|---|---|---|---|
| Albion Mill | John Gartside and Co. | Hollingworth | | | |
| Arrowscroft Mill | John Gartside and Co. | Hollingworth , 53°27′43″N 1°59′33″W | | | |
| Armfield | William Buckley | Arnfield Brook 53°28′27″N 1°58′53″W | 1828 | | 20 |
| | Notes: submerged | | | | |
| Arnfield Tower | | | | | |
| Arundel Street Mill | | | | | |
| Barrack; The Hope; Top; Higher Water; Wards | Robert Bennett | Shelf Brook | 1807 | | 72 |
| | Notes: fire | | | | |
| Waterside and Bridge inc. Eleven Bay Mill inc.Garden Mill inc.Nine Holes inc.Crystal Palace inc.Old Corn Mill inc.Chimney Mill inc.Reservoir Mill | Turner and Thornley; John and William Sidebottom; John Gartside and Co.- purchased 1899 | River Etherow, 53°28′08″N 1°58′21″W | 1760 | 1976 | 135 |
| Boggart | Joseph Lyne | Glossop Brook | 1817 | | 208 |
| | Notes: Under Edmund Potter became Potters Dinting Vale Printworks | | | | |
| Bottoms Mill; Bottom Lodge Mill | John Turner | River Etherow 53°28′13″N 1°57′53″W | 1795 | 1870 | 75 |
| | Notes: Submerged under Bottoms Reservoir | | | | |
| Braddock's Mill; Mouse Nest | James Braddock | Padfield Brook | 1811 | | 49 |
| Brookside | | | | | |
| Bridge End Fulling | 4 partners | Glossop Brook | 1780 | | 245 |
| | Notes: Start of Howardtown Mill | | | | |
| Bridge Field | John Garlick | Gnat Hole Brook | 1784 | | 91 |
| | Notes: fire | | | | |
| Brookfield Shepley | Samuel Shepley | Glossop Brook | 1818 | | |
| Burymewick | John Shaw | Gnat Hole Brook | 1805 | | 220 |
| Bleach Works; River Etherow Bleach Works | | River Etherow , 53°27′41″N 1°59′11″W | | | |
| Broadbottom Mills; Broad Mills | Joe and George Sidebottom | Broadbottom | 1793 | | 232 |
| Bridge | James Sidebottom; Tom Harrop | Tintwistle 53°28′08″N 1°58′21″W | 1854 | 1953 | 45 |
| | Notes: Comm. 5 June 1899 fire 1953 derelict | | | | |
| Best Hill; Marsland | Kelsall and Marsland | Broadbottom, | 1793 | | 232 |
| Bank Bottom | | Hadfield | | | |
| | Notes: converted Henry Wyatt 1895 | | | | |
| Brown's Bleach Works | Thomas and William Brown | Crowden | before 1846 | | |
| Bent Meadows Mill | | River Etherow; Hollingworth | | | |
| Bankwood; Botany | | Broadbottom | William Wardlaw | | |
| Chadwick | | | | | |
| Chew Wood | Rowbottom | Chisworth 53°24′30″N 2°00′52″W | 1795 | | 167 |
| | Notes: A wool carding and scrubbing mill managed by the Rowbottoms. Mill powered by water from Alma Coal Pit. | | | | |
| Clough | | | | | |
| Compstall | Edward and James Andrew; Andrew Bruckshaw &Co; 1902 Calico Printers Assoc. 1934 Graveside &Co | Etherow | before 1828 | | |
| | Notes: Compstall Lily Waterwheel | | | | |
| Coobes | | | | | |
| Charlestown | Charles Hadfield | Gnat Hole Brook | 1792 | | 170 |
| | Notes: Became John Waltons Closed | | | | |
| Clarke's Mill | William Barber | Padfield Brook | 1803 | | |
| Cross Cliffe | John Newton | Hurst Brook | 1782–3 | | |
| | Notes: fire | | | | |
| Cowbrook | William Hadfield | Hurst Brook, 53°26′38″N 1°55′56″W | 1801 | | 97 |
| Dalton's Print Works; Bleaching Co. | | River Etherow; Hollingworth | before 1816 | | |
| Dinting Vale Print Works | Joseph Lyne; 1825 Edmund Potter | Dinting Vale | 1966 | | |
| Dinting Mill; Logwood | Wagstaff Brothers | Glossop Brook | 1804–5 | | |
| | Notes: Passed to Potters, lower floor dye extraction, upper floors Day School | | | | |
| Gnat Hole (wool) | John Robinson | Gnat Hole Brook | 1790 | | 94 |
| | Notes: | | | | |
| Hadfield Lodge | Thomas Thornley | Padfield Brook | before 1811 | | |
| Hawkshead; Roofless; Starkies | James Starkie | Shelf Brook 53°27′10″N 1°56′07″W | 1791 | | |
| | Notes: Isaac Jackson 1905 | | | | |
| Holehouse | | | | | |
| Hodge Printworks | Samuel Matley; 1872 Ledeboer; Harry Alister Constable | Broadbottom | 1763 | | 190 |
| Hodge Hall Mill; Moss Mill; Bridge Mill, Broadbottom | Moss Bros. Joseph Beckett | Broadbottom | | | |
| Howardtown Mills | Wood | Howardtown 53°26′34″N 1°56′32″W | | standing | |
| | Notes: | | | | |
| Hurst Mill | Robert Atherton | Hurst Brook, 53°26′36″N 1°55′38″W | 1799–1802 | | |
| Jumble Mill (wool) | John Robinson | | before 1790 | | |
| Jubilee | | | | | |
| Knott's | | | | | |
| Lymefield | John Marsland; 1872 Edward Platt | Broadbottom 53°26′19″N 2°00′22″W | before 1872 | standing | |
| | Notes: | | | | |
| Longdendale Works | John Walton | River Etherow; Woolley Bridge , 53°27′41″N 1°59′01″W | | | |
| Lower Mill | William Barber | Padfield Brook | 1804 | | 59 |
| Mersey Mills; Rhodes Bottom Mill | Thomas and Ames Rhodes; 1928 Lancashire Cotton Corp. | River Etherow; Woolley Bridge, 53°27′40″N 1°59′04″W | 1846 | | 89 |
| Mill Town (Wood's Mill) | Thomas Shaw | Glossop Brook | 1803 | | 39 |
| | Notes: fire, Rebuilt as Woods Mill | | | | |
| Millbrook; Millbrook House | Sidebottom | Hollingworth Brook | 1790 | 1882 | 92 |
| Meadow :Silk :Grove | Robert Shepley | Shelf Brook 53°27′00″N 1°56′04″W | 1825 | Standing | 200 |
| | Notes: | | | | |
| New Water | Robert Bennett | Shelf Brook | 1815 | | 58 |
| | Notes: Meadow Mills | | | | |
| Old Paper; Kidfield | Thomas Turner | Fair Vage Clough; Crowden | before 1847 | | |
| Padfield Brook | Robert Lees | Padfield Brook | 1793 | | 7 |
| Primrose | Joseph Hadfield | Gnat Hole Brook | 1811 | | 61 |
| Red | | Hadfield | | | |
| Rolfe's Mill | William Sheppard | Shelf Brook | 1784 | | 23 |
| | Notes: Became cottages | | | | |
| Shepley | John Shepley | Shelf Brook, 53°26′34″N 1°57′15″W | 1784–5 | | |
| Shepley Green Vale | Shepley of Charlesworth | Glossop Brook | 1784,1810 | | |
| Station Mill | Thomas and Edward Platt | Hadfield 53°27′44″N 1°57′51″W | 1855 | | 134 |
| | Notes: Became Wilmans closed 1989 | | | | |
| Simmondley | | | | | |
| Torside | | | | | |
| | Notes: submerged | | | | |
| Tintwistle; Rhodes; Paradise | Thomas Thornley; Thomas Rhodes | Etherow; Tintwistle 53°28′12″N 1°57′28″W | 1770 | 1870 | 100 |
| | Notes: Submerged 1870 | | | | |
| Thread Mill | Benjamin Goodison | Shelf Brook | 1789 | | 109 |
| Thornley Mill | John Thornley | Padfield Brook | before 1820 | | |
| Tip Mill | Bennett Brothers | Gnat Hole Brook | 1791 | | 234 |
| | Notes: incorporated into Olive and Partington | | | | |
| Turn Lee | William Kershaw; Edward Partington | Gnat Hole Brook | | | |
| | Notes: incorporated into Olive and Partington | | | | |
| Valehouse Mill | Robert and John Thornley | River Etherow 53°28′35″N 1°56′51″W | 1795 | | 72 |
| | Notes: sold for reservoir, and submerged | | | | |
| Warth Mill | Joseph Hallam | Shelf Brook | 1784–5 | | |
| | Notes: Meadow Mills | | | | |
| Waterloo | Robert Bennett | Shelf Brook | 1807 | | 72 |
| | Notes: fire | | | | |
| Whitfield | George Roberts | Gnat Hole Brook | 1802 | | 223 |
| Wrens Nest | Matthew Ellison | Glossop Brook 53°26′38″N 1°57′30″W | 1815 | standing | 140 |
| | Notes: A first mill was built here by Lord Howard but sold to the Ellisons. In 1822 Francis Sumner moved to Glossop (his step mother was an Ellison).He built the six storey mill and warehouses. At its peak it employed 1400. It had 123,000 spindles and 2541 looms. It ceased training after a fire in 1955. | | | | |
| Waterside | Sidebottom Family | Hadfield , 53°28′00″N 1°58′19″W | | | |
| White | | Padfield Brook , 53°27′51″N 1°58′01″W | | 1950 | |
| Woolley | William & John Robert | Arnfield Brook 53°28′12″N 1°59′09″W | 1840 | 1953 | 113 |
| | Notes: before 1840 | | | | |
| Woolley Bridge; Lees | Henry Lees | River Etherow 53°27′29″N 1°59′14″W | 1825 | 1925 | 56 |
| | Notes: This was a medium-sized mill built in 1825 for cotton spinning, in the 1840s it employed 200 hands, it became Henry Lees & Son in 1870. In 1881 it was sold to George Fawcett, a basket and skip manufacturer.- in 1890 it became an iron works, then in 1903 a dye works but in 1908 it was a picture Palace it closed in 1925 and was demolished. | | | | |

All registered in Annals of Glossop.
