= Torside Reservoir =

Reservoir in Derbyshire, England

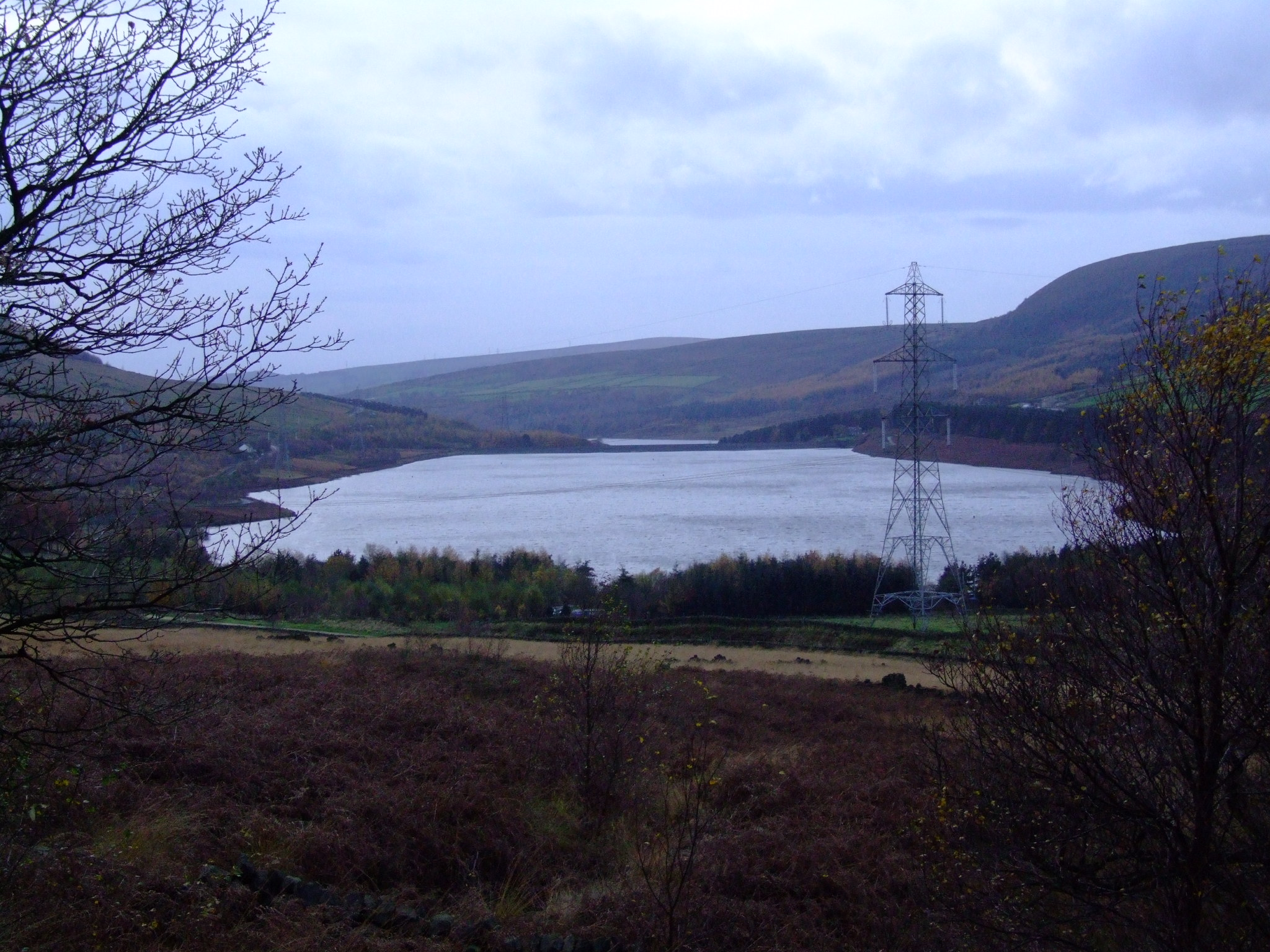
- viewed from the east

- Location within Derbyshire
- Location: Derbyshire
- Coordinates: 53.482°N 1.904°W
- Lake type: impounding reservoir
- Primary inflows: River Etherow, Crowden Brook, Torside Clough
- Primary outflows: River Etherow
- Basin countries: United Kingdom
- Max. length: 2.25 km (1.40 mi)
- Surface area: 160 acres (65 ha)
- Average depth: 26 m (85 ft)
- Water volume: 6,700 ML (1.5×10^{9} imp gal)
- Surface elevation: 653 ft (199 m)

Torside Reservoir is the largest man-made lake in Longdendale in north Derbyshire, England. It was constructed by John Frederick Bateman between April 1849 and July 1864 as part of the Longdendale Chain of reservoirs to supply water from the River Etherow to the urban areas of Greater Manchester.

The Manchester Corporation Waterworks Act 1847 (10 & 11 Vict. c. cciii) gave permission for the construction of the Woodhead and Arnfield reservoirs; the Manchester Corporation Waterworks Amendment Act 1848 (11 & 12 Vict. c. ci) allowed the construction of Torside and Rhodeswood Reservoirs, and an aqueduct to convey the water to the Arnfield reservoir where it would pass through the Mottram Tunnel to Godley.

It was stated in a statutory report, under the Reservoirs Act 1975, dated 12 June 1984, that all five reservoirs could be overtopped during a probable maximum flood. Woodhead, as the fountainhead, would require the most extensive improvements, but Torside needed crest remedial work. The wave wall was demolished and replaced with one 4 metres (13 ft) above the overflow sill. The clay core was extended to 1.34 m (4 ft 5 in) above the overflow sill and the road level was raised to 3.29 m (10.8 ft). The work took place between 1993 and 1994.

== See also ==
- List of dams and reservoirs in United Kingdom

| Preceded by Rhodeswood Reservoir | Longdendale Chain Reservoirs (West to East) | Succeeded by Woodhead Reservoir |
