= Hollingworth Reservoir =

Coordinates: 53°28′32″N 1°59′19″W

- Location within Greater Manchester
- Location: Longdendale, Greater Manchester and North Derbyshire
- Lake type: former impounding reservoir
- Primary inflows: Ogden Brook
- Primary outflows: Arnfield Reservoir
- Basin countries: United Kingdom
- Surface area: 13 acres (5.3 ha)
- Average depth: 52 ft (16 m)
- Water volume: 73×10^{6} imp gal (330 ML; 270 acre⋅ft)
- Surface elevation: 554 ft 9 in (169.09 m)

Hollingworth Reservoir is a former reservoir near Hollingworth, Tameside, Greater Manchester. The reservoir straddles the Greater Manchester–Derbyshire border. It was constructed in 1854 as part of the Longdendale Chain, but was abandoned in 1987 and now forms part of the Swallows Wood nature reserve.

== See also ==
- Arnfield Reservoir
- Bottoms Reservoir (to the East)
- List of dams and reservoirs in United Kingdom
