= Longdendale Chain =

Series of reservoirs in England

Coordinates: 53.4927°N 1.8642°W

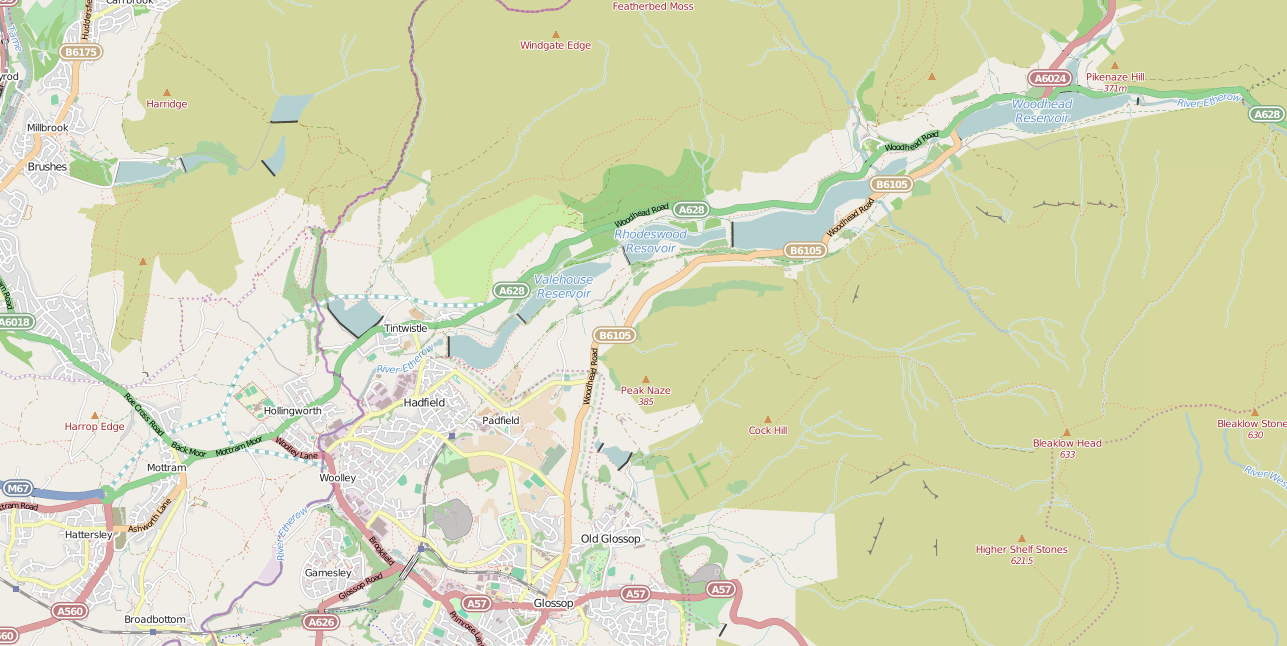
The Londendale reservoirs relative to Glossop and Hadfield

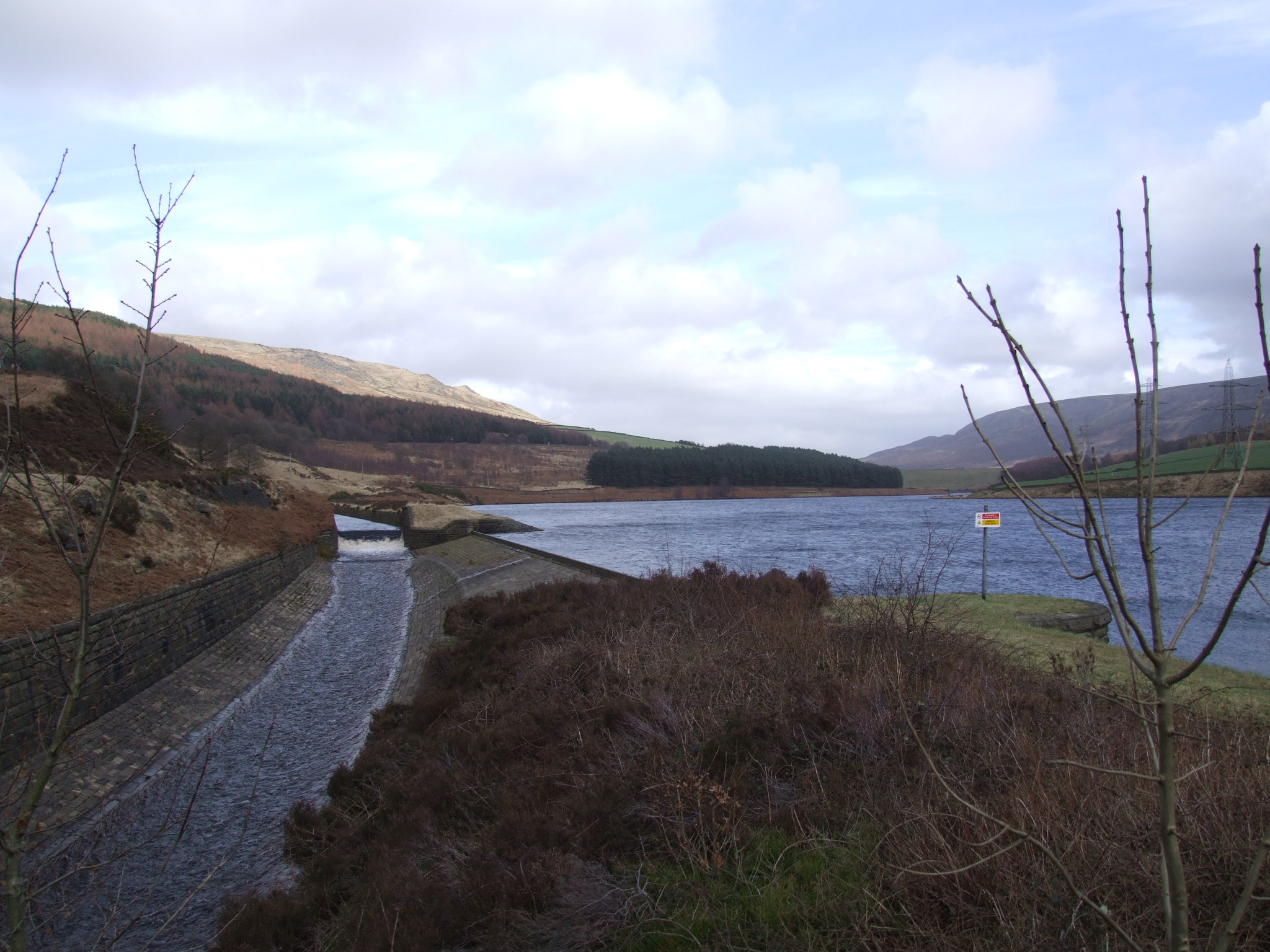
At the Rhodeswood reservoir dam, we see the outflow canal from the Torside Reservoir dam, alongside the Rhodeswood Reservoir. The Torside dam can be seen in the distance. To the right is Shining Clough Moss and Bleaklow. To the left Bareholm Moss and Black Hill

The Longdendale Chain is a sequence of six reservoirs on the River Etherow in the Longdendale Valley, in northern Derbyshire. They were constructed between 1848 and 1884 to a design by John Frederick Bateman to supply the growing population of Manchester and Salford with fresh water.

The top three reservoirs (Woodhead, Torside and Rhodeswood) and Arnfield are for drinking water, and the lower reservoirs (Valehouse and Bottoms) are used as compensation reservoirs to maintain the downstream flow of the river. There was originally a seventh – Hollingworth Reservoir – which was abandoned in 1990, and has become part of the Swallows Wood nature reserve.

Water flows by gravity through the Mottram Tunnel to the Godley covered reservoir where it drops to the service reservoirs at Denton, Audenshaw, Gorton and Prestwich.

== Reservoirs ==
The reservoirs are listed from upstream to downstream i.e. from east to west:

- Woodhead Reservoir
- Torside Reservoir
- Rhodeswood Reservoir
- Valehouse Reservoir
- Bottoms Reservoir
- Arnfield Reservoir
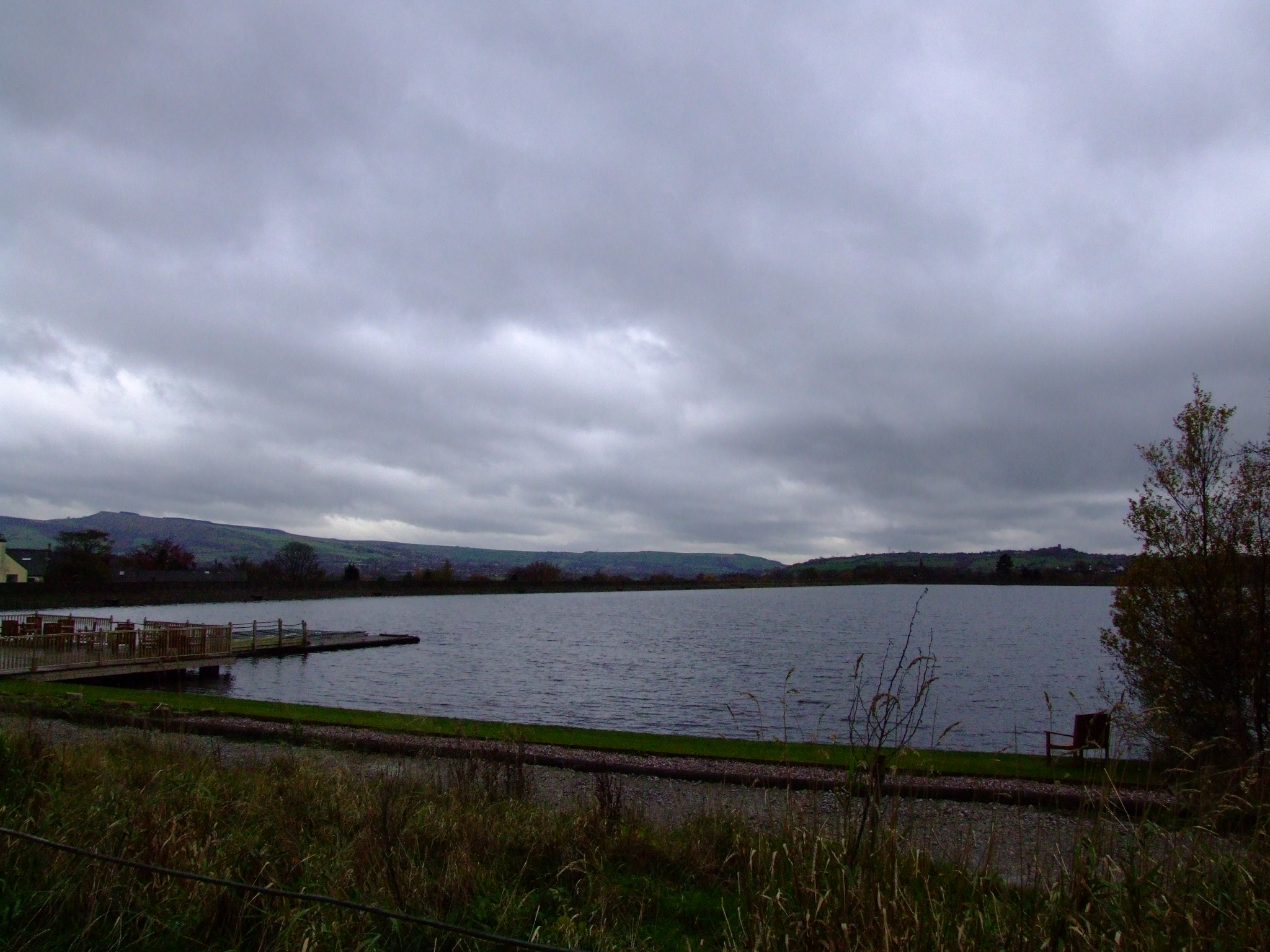
Arnfield

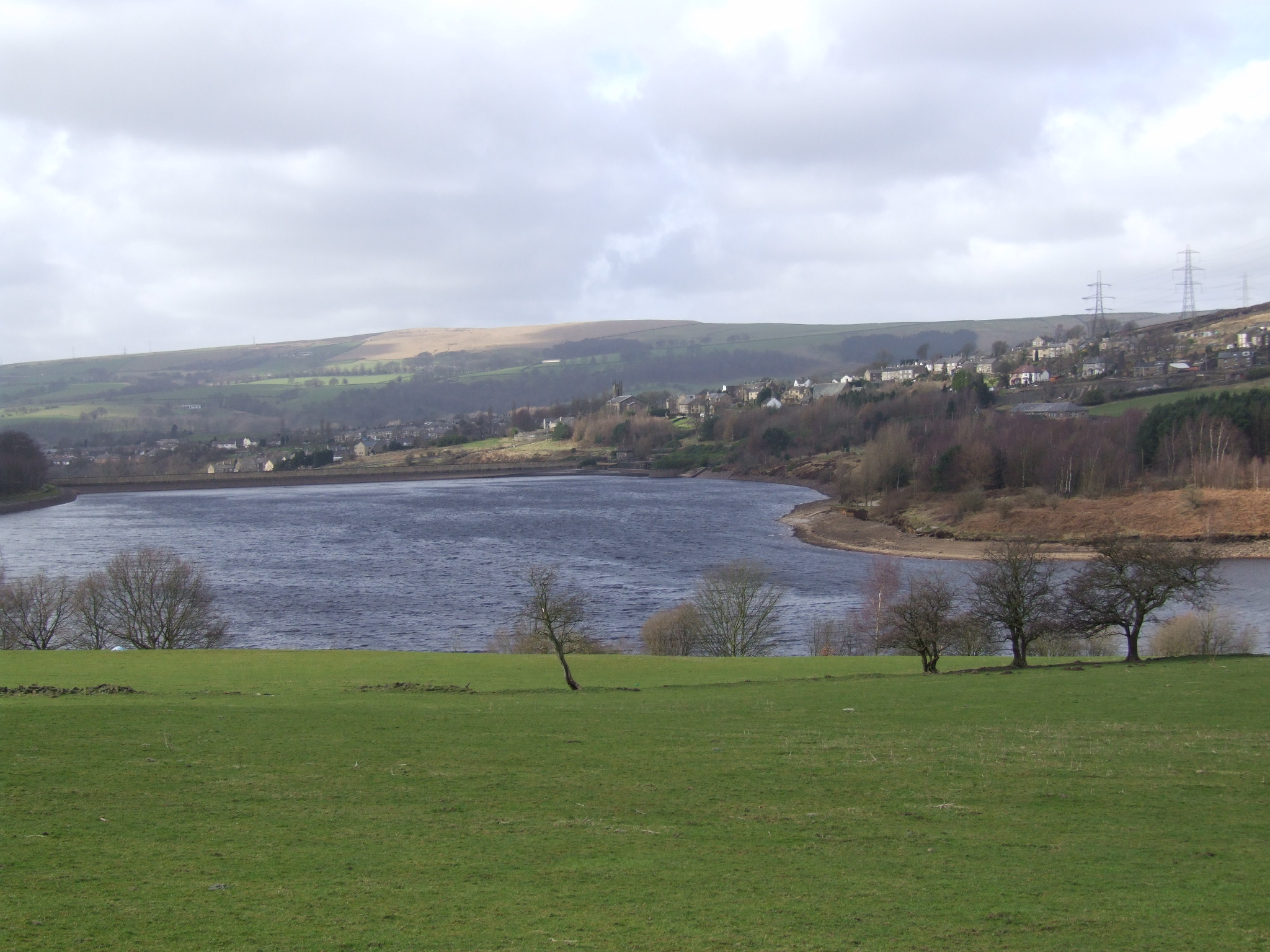
Bottoms

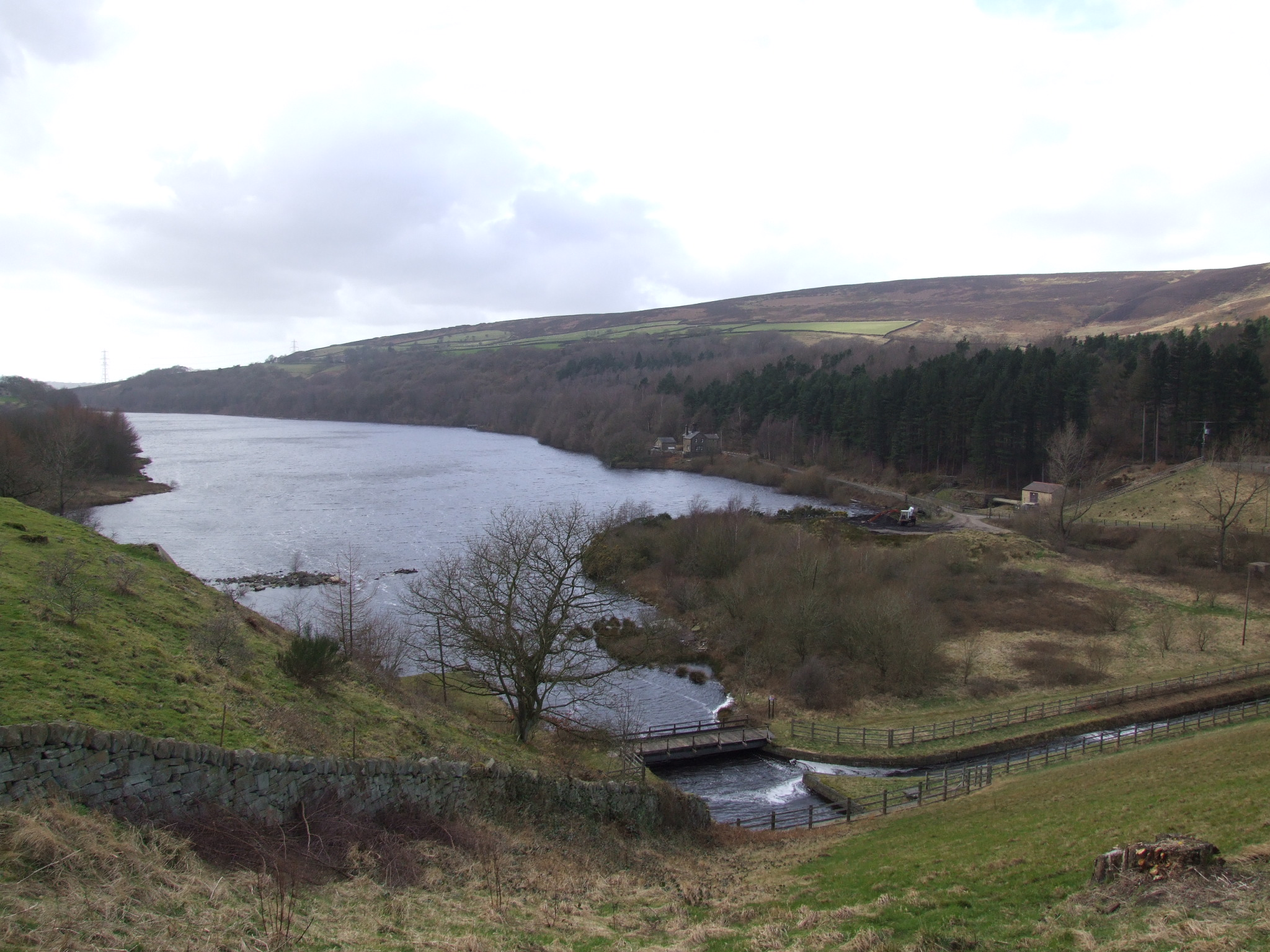
Valehouse

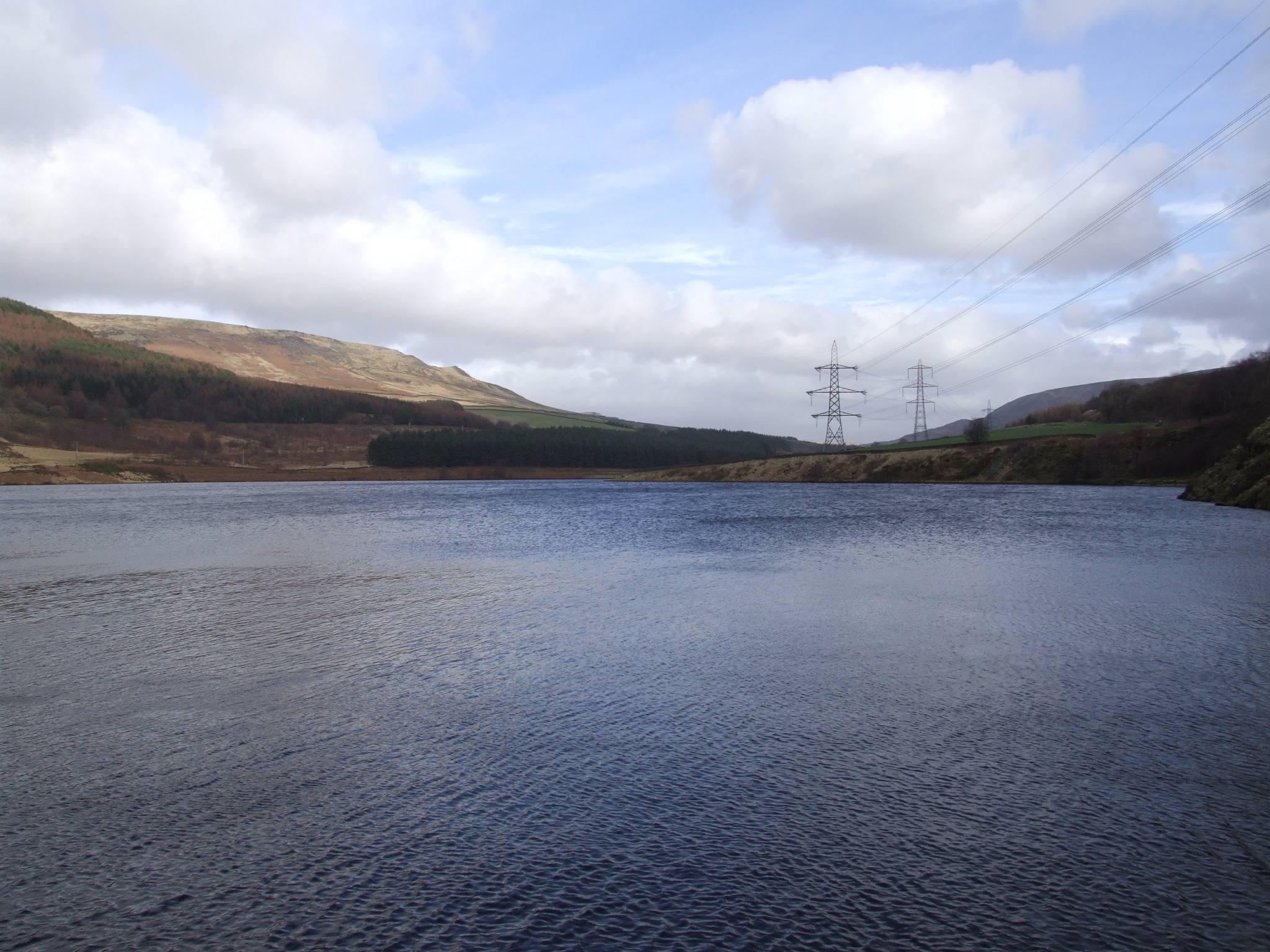
Rhodeswood

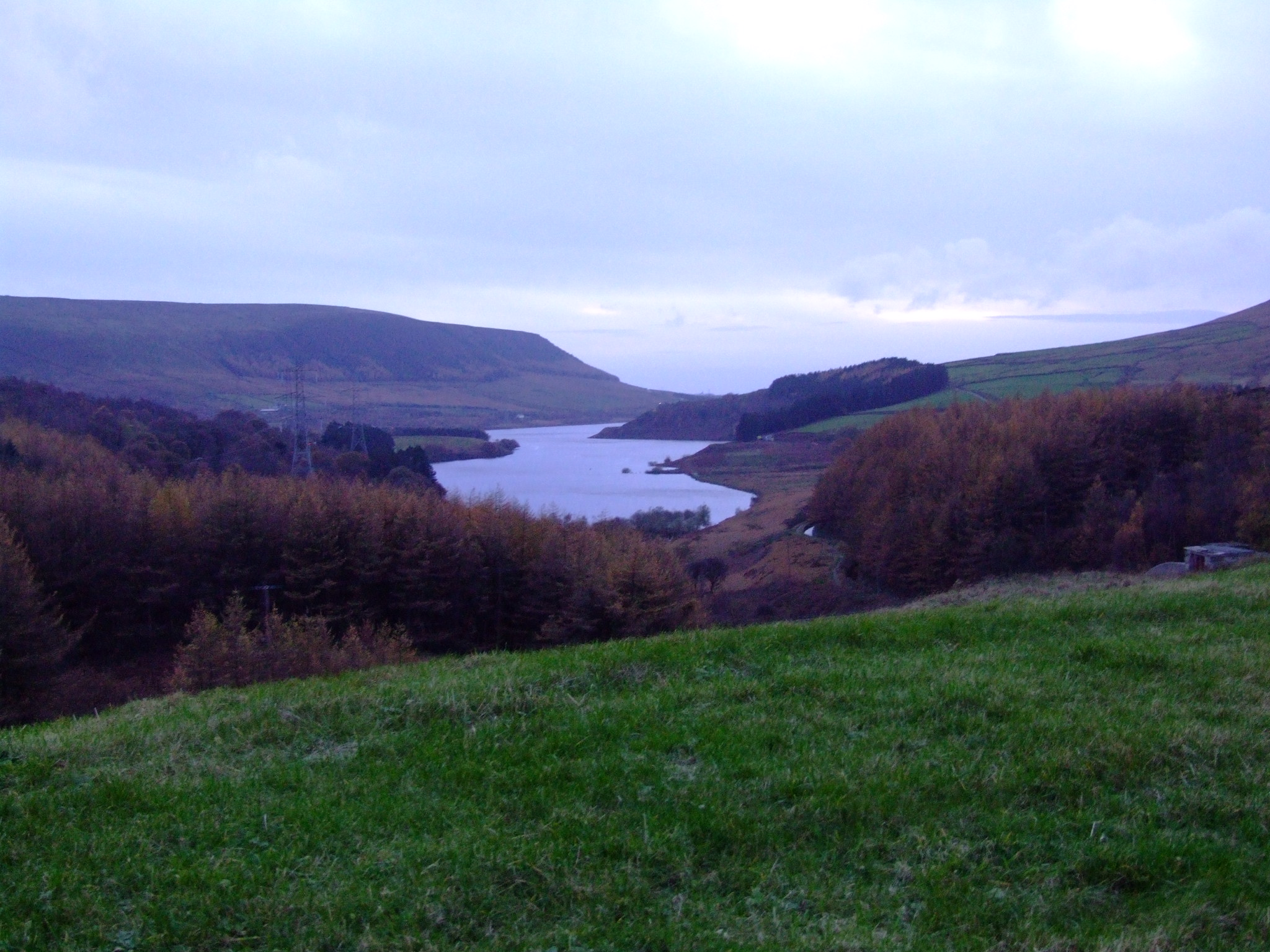
Torside

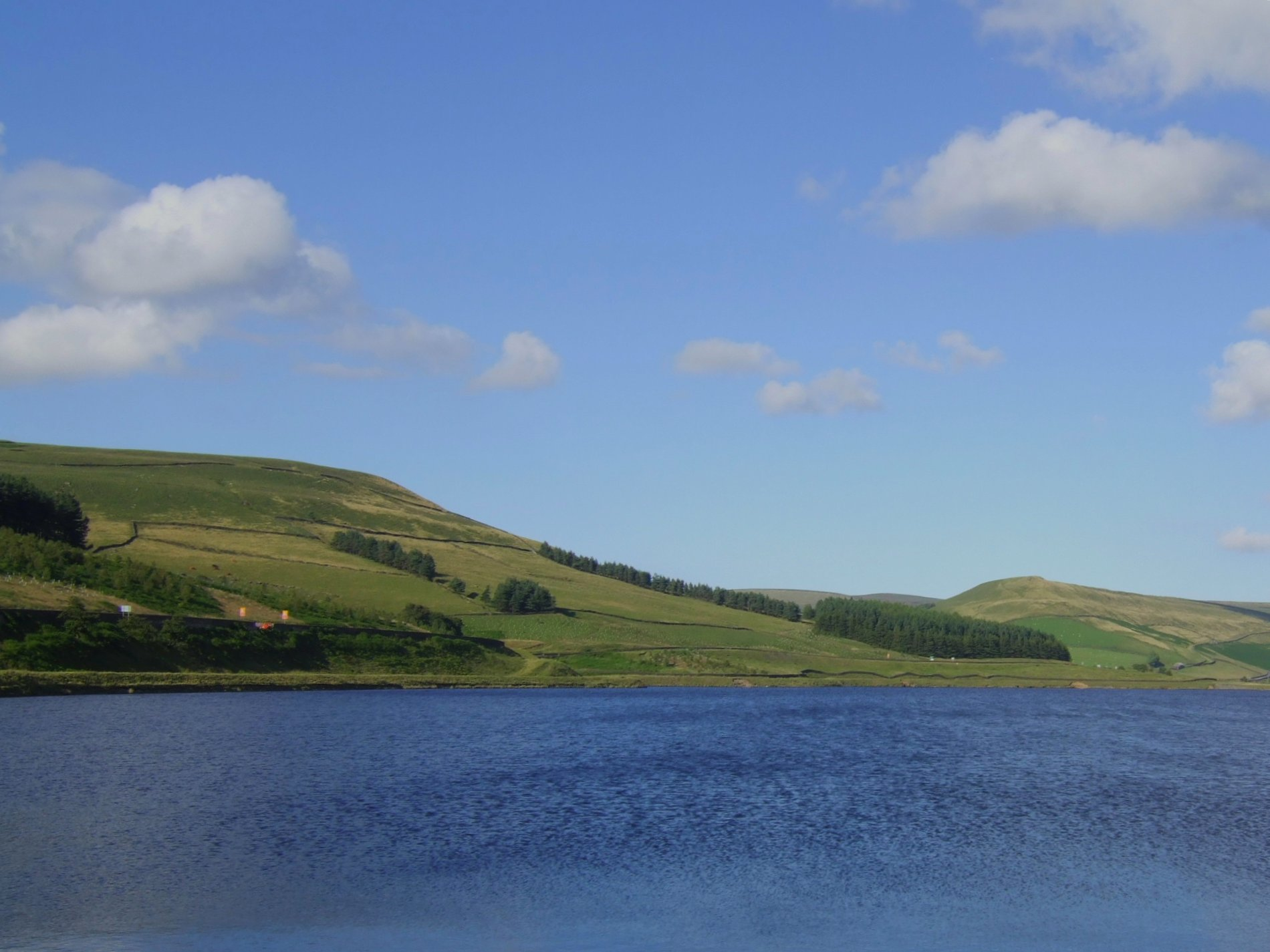
Woodhead

== See also ==
- List of dams and reservoirs in United Kingdom
