= Mottram Tunnel =

Water tunnel in England

Coordinates: 53°27′21″N 2°02′41″W

The Mottram Tunnel (Mottram in Longdendale) is a tunnel carrying drinking water by gravity from Arnfield Reservoir, Tintwistle, Derbyshire, in the valley of the River Etherow, to Godley, Greater Manchester, in the valley of the River Tame. It was essential to the construction of the Longdendale Chain of reservoirs constructed by John Frederick Bateman. The tunnel was built between August 1848 and October 1850, and the Godley Reservoir was finished in 1851 to receive and filter the water.

The Manchester Corporation Waterworks Act 1847 (10 & 11 Vict. c. cciii) gave permission for the construction of the Woodhead, Hollingworth and Arnfield reservoirs, and the construction of a masonry aqueduct to convey drinking water from the Arnfield and Hollingworth reservoirs to a service reservoir at Godley. The Manchester Corporation Waterworks Act 1848 allowed the construction of Torside and Rhodeswood reservoirs, and an aqueduct to convey the water to the Arnfield reservoir.

The tunnel pierces the ridge that lies between the Etherow valley and the Tame valley. It is 3,100 yards (2,800 m) long, and has a gradient of 5 feet per mile (95 cm/km). It is lined in stone, is 6 feet (1.8 m) in diameter and can carry 50 million gallons a day (230 Ml/d).

== See also ==
- List of reservoirs and dams in the United Kingdom
