= Arnfield Reservoir =

Man-made lake in Derbyshire, England

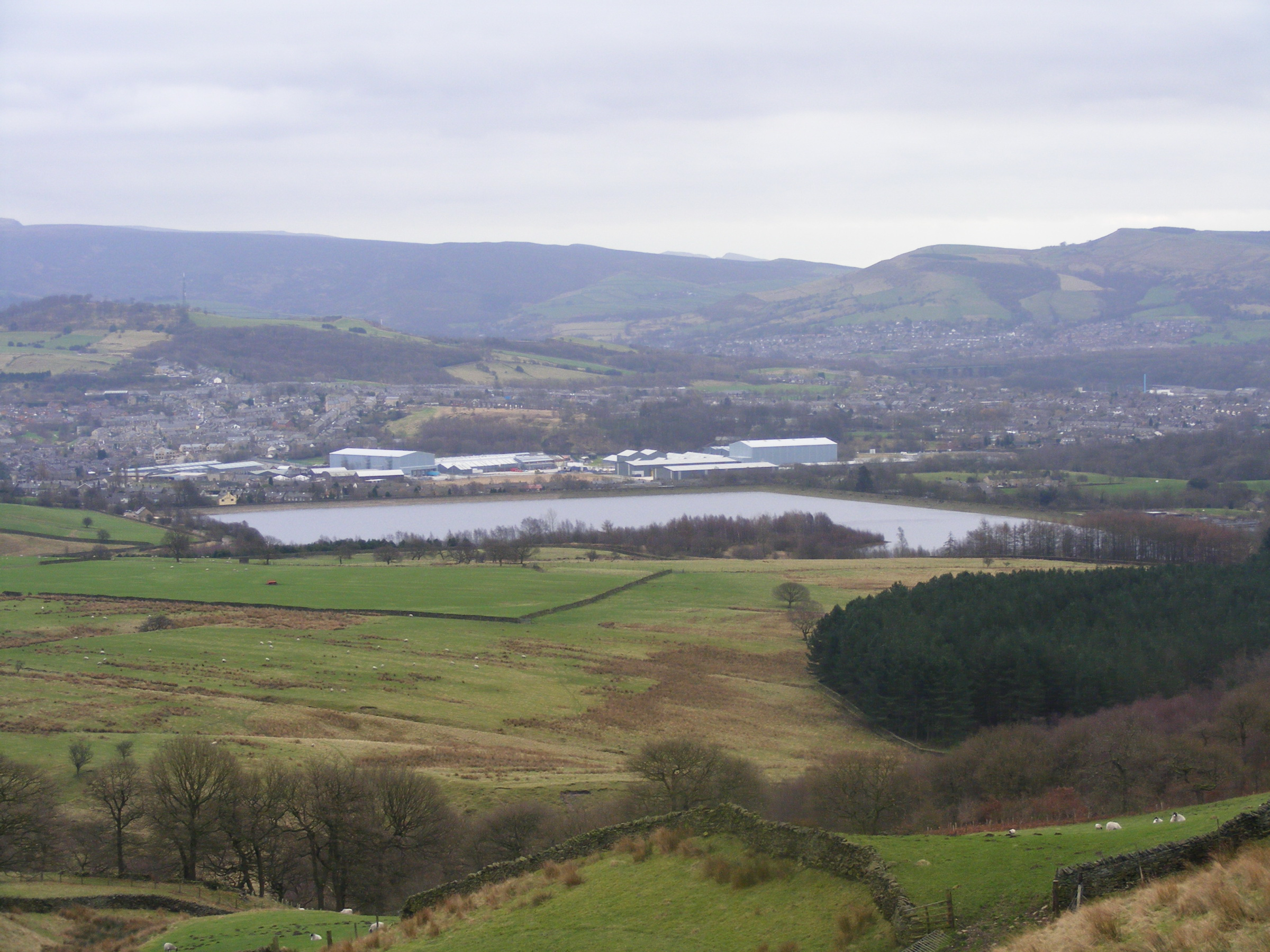
- Arnfield Reservoir

- Location within Derbyshire
- Location: Longdendale, North Derbyshire
- Coordinates: 53.473°N 1.981°W
- Lake type: impounding reservoir
- Primary inflows: Arnfield Brook
- Primary outflows: River Etherow
- Basin countries: United Kingdom
- Surface area: 39 acres (16 ha)
- Max. depth: 52 ft (16 m)
- Water volume: 209 million imperial gallons (950 Ml)
- Surface elevation: 540 ft 3 in (164.67 m)

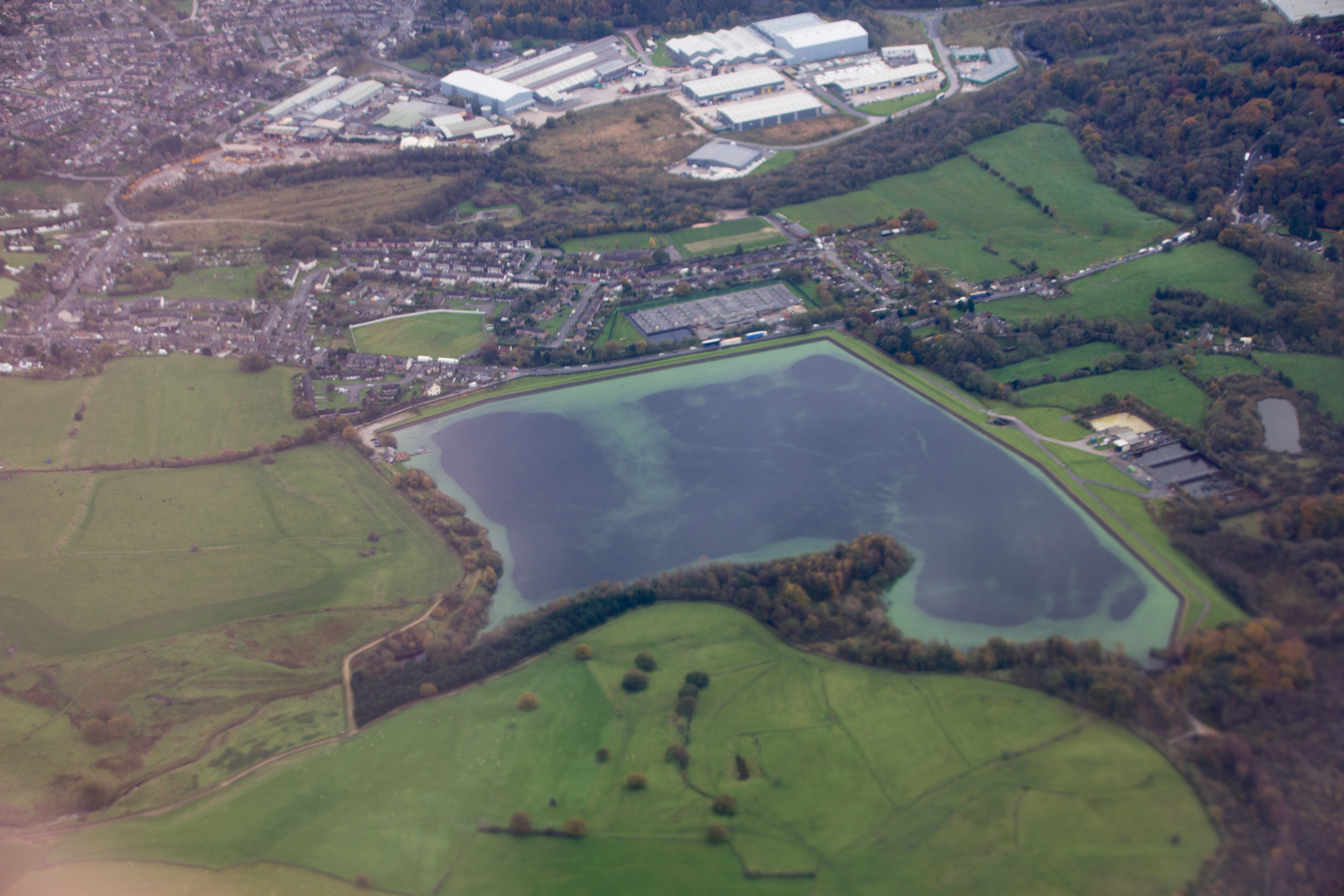
The reservoir seen from the air in 2017

Arnfield Reservoir is a man-made lake in Longdendale in north Derbyshire, England. It was constructed in 1854 as part of the Longdendale chain to supply water from the River Etherow to the urban areas of Greater Manchester. Unlike the other reservoirs in the chain, Arnfield and Hollingworth Reservoir are not in the Etherow valley but lie in the valley of tributary brooks to the north and above (Arnfield lies around 1 mile from Bottoms Reservoir in the Longdendale Chain). From Arnfield the water is extracted to pass through the Mottram Tunnel to Godley.

The Manchester Corporation Waterworks Act 1847 (10 & 11 Vict. c. cciii) gave permission for the construction of the Woodhead, Arnfield and Hollingworth Reservoirs and an aqueduct to convey waters to a service reservoir at Godley. The Manchester Corporation Waterworks Amendment Act 1848 (11 & 12 Vict. c. ci) allowed the construction of Torside and Rhodeswood Reservoirs, and an aqueduct to convey the water to the Arnfield reservoir.

The earthen embankment is 17 metres (56 ft) high and the five sections total 953 m (3,127 ft) in length. It was constructed of local clay; a masonry overflow weir protects the reservoir from overtopping. Beneath it lay the trapezoidal Longdendale aqueduct that followed the contour to take water from the reservoirs to the Godley reservoir. Until the 1960s, water was treated by passing it through straining frames at Godley.

In the 1960s, a more sophisticated system of treatment was employed. Treatment plants were built at Arnfield and Godley. At Arnfield, lime, ferric sulphate and polyelectrolyte are added to the water in mixing chambers. This flocculating agent binds together the impurities, which sink and are removed in sedimentation tanks. At Godley, lime is added to remove manganese, and the water is filtered and chlorinated and fed into the distribution network.

Also in the 1960s, part of the Longdendale aqueduct was replaced with 1,200 mm (47 in) diameter pipes. In 1990, the Hollingworth Reservoir (now part of Swallows Wood nature reserve) was decommissioned and levelled and waters from the Ogden Brook fed into Arnfield. In 2004, two sections of the embankment were strengthened.

== See also ==
- Hollingworth Reservoir
- List of dams and reservoirs in United Kingdom

Preceded by -	Longdendale Chain Reservoirs (West to East)	Succeeded by Bottoms Reservoir
