= Rhodeswood Reservoir =

Reservoir in Derbyshire, England

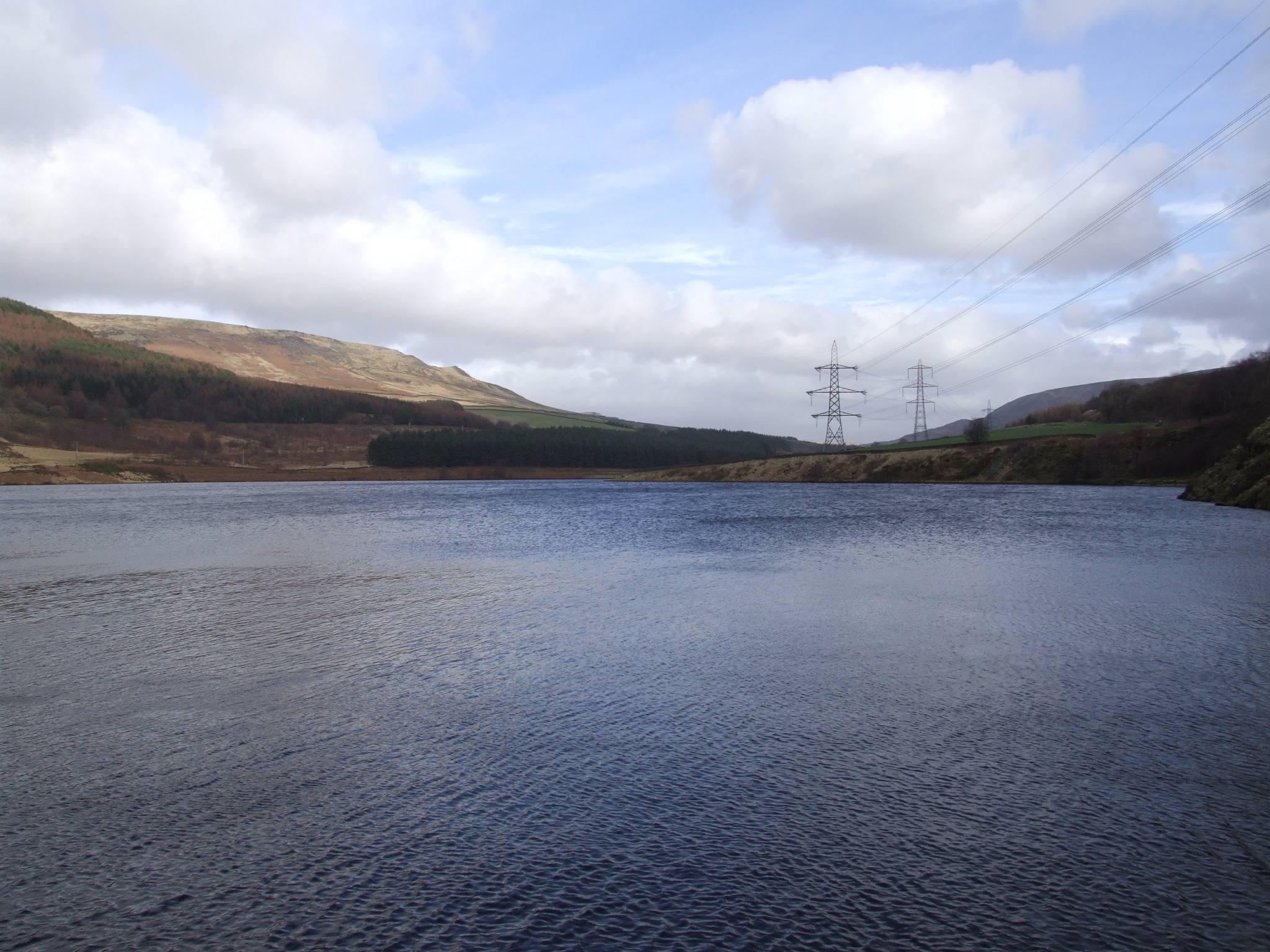
- Rhodeswood Reservoir

- Location within Derbyshire
- Location: Longdendale, North Derbyshire
- Coordinates: 53.481°N 1.929°W
- Lake type: impounding reservoir
- Primary inflows: River Etherow
- Primary outflows: River Etherow
- Basin countries: United Kingdom
- Max. depth: 68 ft (21 m)
- Water volume: 500 million imperial gallons (2.3 Gl)
- Surface elevation: 574 ft 6 in (175.11 m)

Rhodeswood Reservoir is a man-made lake in Longdendale in north Derbyshire, England. It was constructed by John Frederick Bateman between 1849 and June 1855 as part of the Longdendale Chain of reservoirs to supply water from the River Etherow to the urban areas of Greater Manchester. It is third in the chain, and it is from here that the water is extracted to pass through the Mottram Tunnel to Godley for Manchester.

The Manchester Corporation Waterworks Act 1847 (10 & 11 Vict. c. cciii) gave permission for the construction of the Woodhead and Arnfield reservoirs; the Manchester Corporation Waterworks Amendment Act 1848 (11 & 12 Vict. c. ci) allowed the construction of Torside and Rhodeswood Reservoirs, and an aqueduct to convey the water to the Arnfield reservoir where it would pass through the Mottram Tunnel to Godley.

During construction, landslips were a problem. On the night of 6 February 1852, 30 acres (120,000 m^{2}) of land beneath the contractors' village of New Yarmouth moved 6 inches (150 mm) obliquely to the watercourse. Bateman consulted the engineers Robert Stephenson and Isambard Kingdom Brunel. Pipes were sunk to draw off the water from the underlying shale.

The purest water in a reservoir lies between 1.5 and 3 metres (4 ft 11 in and 9 ft 10 in) beneath the water's surface, so water was extracted by means of syphons. The water now flows directly to the Arnfield Treatment Works in Tintwistle and to the Mottram Tunnel.

A statutory report, prepared under the Reservoirs Act 1975 and dated 12 June 1984, stated that all five reservoirs could be overtopped during a Probable Maximum Flood. Woodhead as the fountainhead would have the most extensive improvements, and with these completed there was no danger at Rhodeswood of overtopping; however, there was weakness in the north spillway. To reduce the pressure, the roadway was consolidated to protect the north spillway from erosion, the embankment was raised by 40 millimetres (1.6 in) above the road, the wave wall was heightened by 1.2 m (3 ft 11 in) and the south spillway tunnel was remodelled. The work took place between 1994 and 1995.

== See also ==
- List of dams and reservoirs in United Kingdom

Preceded by Valehouse Reservoir	Longdendale Chain Reservoirs (West to East)	Succeeded by Torside Reservoir
