= Woodhead Reservoir =

Reservoir in Derbyshire, England

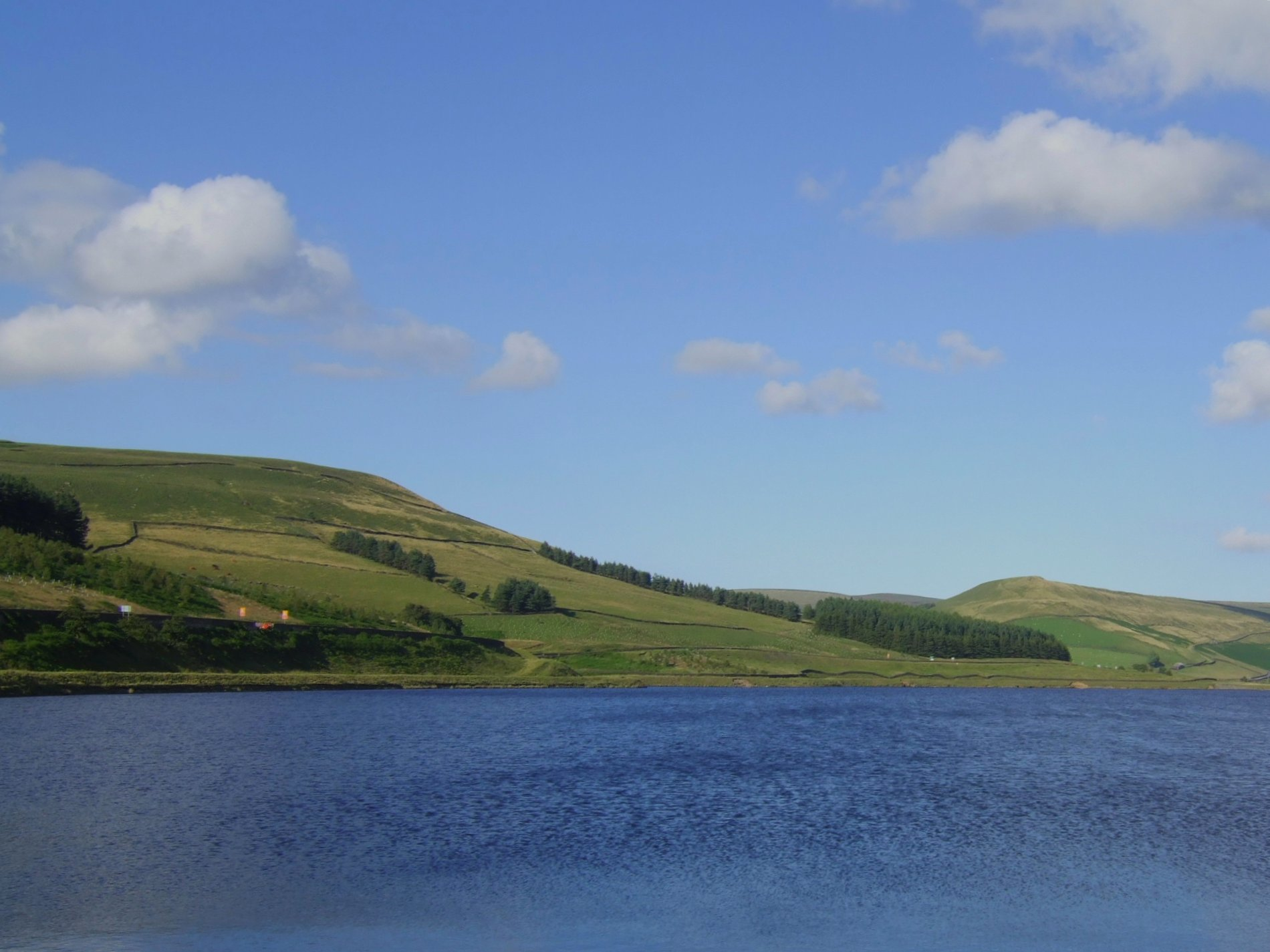

- Location within Derbyshire
- Location: Longdendale, Derbyshire
- Coordinates: 53.4936°N 1.8682°W
- Lake type: reservoir
- Primary inflows: River Etherow, Heyden Brook
- Primary outflows: River Etherow
- Basin countries: United Kingdom
- Surface area: 135 acres (55 ha)
- Max. depth: 71 ft (22 m)
- Water volume: 1,181 million imperial gallons (5.37 Gl)
- Surface elevation: 782 ft (238 m)

Woodhead reservoir is a man-made lake near the hamlet of Woodhead in Longdendale in north Derbyshire, England. It was constructed by John Frederick Bateman between 1847 and June 1877 as part of the Longdendale Chain of reservoirs to supply water from the River Etherow to the urban areas of Greater Manchester. It is at the top of the chain of reservoirs and was the first to be started, though, due to construction problems, it was the last to be completed.

== Act of Parliament ==
The Manchester Corporation Waterworks Act 1847 (10 & 11 Vict. c. cciii) gave permission for the construction of the Woodhead and Arnfield reservoirs and the aqueduct of the Mottram Tunnel. The Manchester Corporation Waterworks Amendment Act 1848 (11 & 12 Vict. c. ci) allowed the construction of Torside and Rhodeswood Reservoirs, and an aqueduct to convey the water from Rhodeswood to the Arnfield reservoir. These acts were important, as mill owners were reliant on water to power their mills and any potential reduction of supply was opposed. The acts guaranteed a flow of 121 million gallons a week.

== Construction ==
The construction of the Woodhead Embankment was ambitious and fraught with difficulties. The embankment was to be about 90 feet (27 m) in height; it was sealed to the underlying impermeable rock by a central impermeable clay puddle core or curtain. This was supported on each side by selected strong earth material, and then gravel to form a slope of 1 in 1 upstream and 1 in 2 downstream. The upstream would be pitched, and faced in stone. The turnpike would pass over the crest. Drinking water would be extracted by means of a tunnel from several metres below the water level, while when full, excess water would pass over the overspill or waste weir.

=== The first embankment ===
Work started in 1848. The Heyden Viaduct, now known as the Woodhead Bridge, was completed in 1851, and turned over to the Salters Brook turnpike road that year. The Woodhead embankment was 20 feet (6 m) from completion. Discharge valves had been supplied by Messrs Armstrong and Co, of Newcastle upon Tyne. There was some leakage but on 10 May 1854 the Woodhead Reservoir was declared complete, with the exception of remedying the leak.

To stop the leak, borings had been made, and ash injected under pressure in the hope it would act as a sealant. In 1858, it was concluded that this would not work; the Etherow valley was on multiple fissures relating to a fault that was causing movement in the soft beds of shale underlying the harder rock beneath the valley. This was the cause of the landslides at Rhodeswood, and the continual problems at Woodhead.

=== The second embankment ===
In 1862, a second embankment downstream of the first embankment was proposed. This took advantage of a continuous length of shale suitable for a seal. The space between the two embankments was infilled. The new puddle trench was sunk 160 ft (49 m) beneath the height of the first embankment, 60 ft (18 m) below the old riverbed, in the main through solid rock. It was filled with concrete as clay could not withstand a water head of 160 ft (49 m). The reservoir was filled in 1877.

== Safety measures ==
It was stated in a statutory report, under the Reservoirs Act 1975, dated 12 June 1984, that all five reservoirs could be over-topped during a Probable Maximum Flood. Woodhead as the fountainhead had the most extensive improvements, relieving the pressure on the other reservoirs. The work took place between 1989 and 1992 at a cost of £3m.

The storage level of the reservoir remained the same but the embankment crest was raised by 6.7 m (22 ft), which meant replacing the B6105 road at a higher level and on a new course. An impervious clay membrane was laid in the upstream face to provide continuity with the 1877 embankment. This was protected with concrete matting faced in stone. The length of the overflow sill was reduced and a new concrete box section installed to throttle the flow, which was directed into the Etherow Pool. A replacement 1,400-millimetre (55 in) diameter guard valve was installed.

== See also ==
- List of dams and reservoirs in United Kingdom

Preceded by Torside Reservoir	Longdendale Chain Reservoirs (West to East)	Succeeded by -
