= Longdendale =

Valley in the Peak District, England

Coordinates: 53.49563°N 1.79496°W

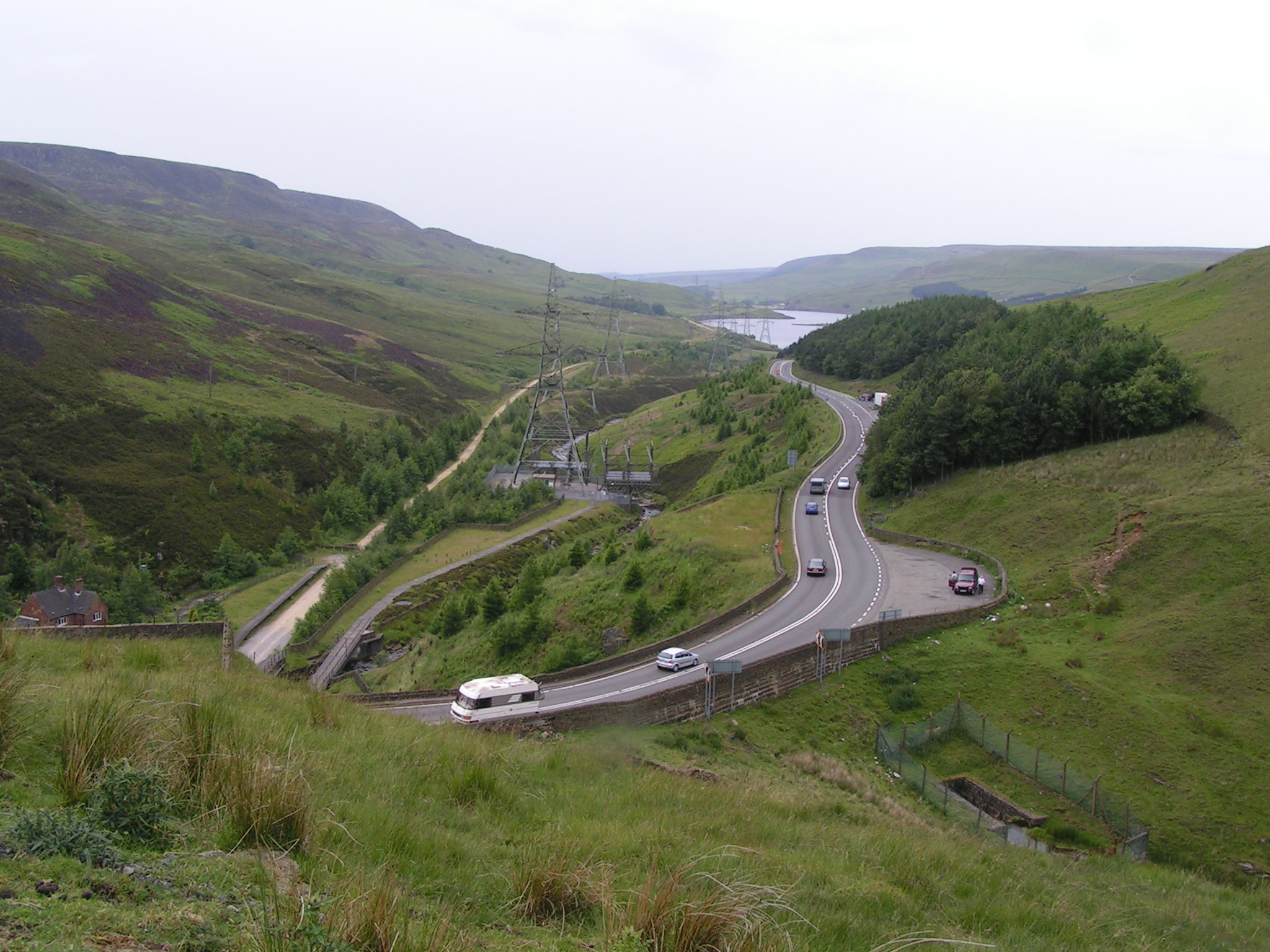
The view westward down Longdendale from above the Woodhead Tunnel, showing the Longdendale Trail (left) and A628 Woodhead Pass road

Longdendale is a valley in the Peak District of England, which spans the counties of Greater Manchester, Derbyshire, South Yorkshire and West Yorkshire. It runs from the north of Glossop and to the south-west of Holmfirth. The name means "long wooded valley".

== Geography ==
The eastern part of the valley is in the non-metropolitan county of Derbyshire and includes the village of Tintwistle and, further east, part of the Peak District National Park; the last half-mile falls into the Metropolitan Borough of Barnsley, in South Yorkshire. The western part of the valley, including the villages of Broadbottom, Mottram in Longdendale and Hollingworth is part of Tameside, in the metropolitan county of Greater Manchester. The whole of Longdendale forms the easternmost extension of the lands within the historic boundaries of Cheshire.

The River Etherow, a tributary of the River Mersey, rises south of Holmfirth and then flows through a chain of six reservoirs, known as the Longdendale Chain: Woodhead, Torside, Rhodeswood, Valehouse, Bottoms and Arnfield. There was a seventh at Hollingworth, but it was abandoned in 1990 and now forms part of Swallows Wood Nature Reserve.

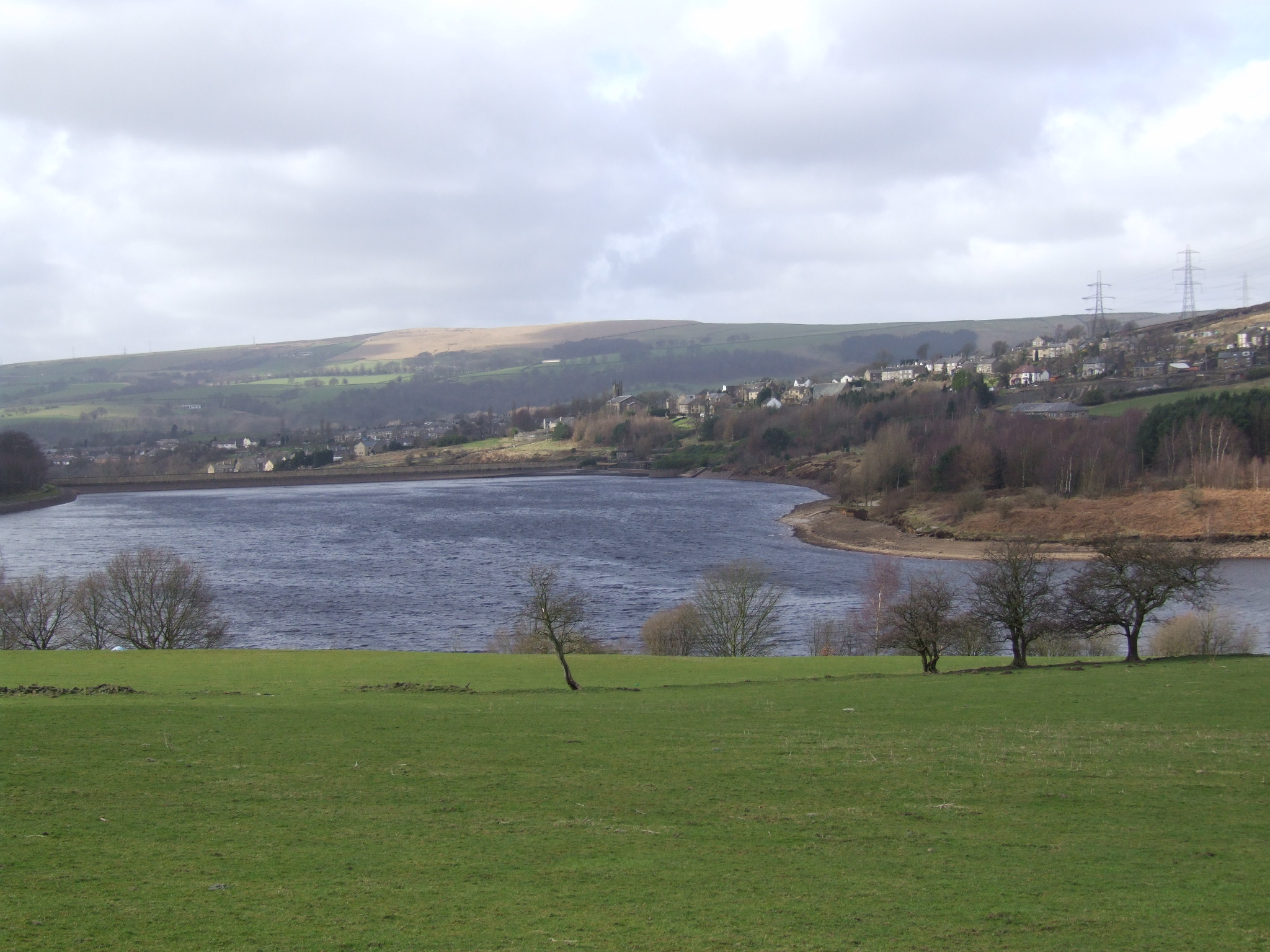
Bottoms

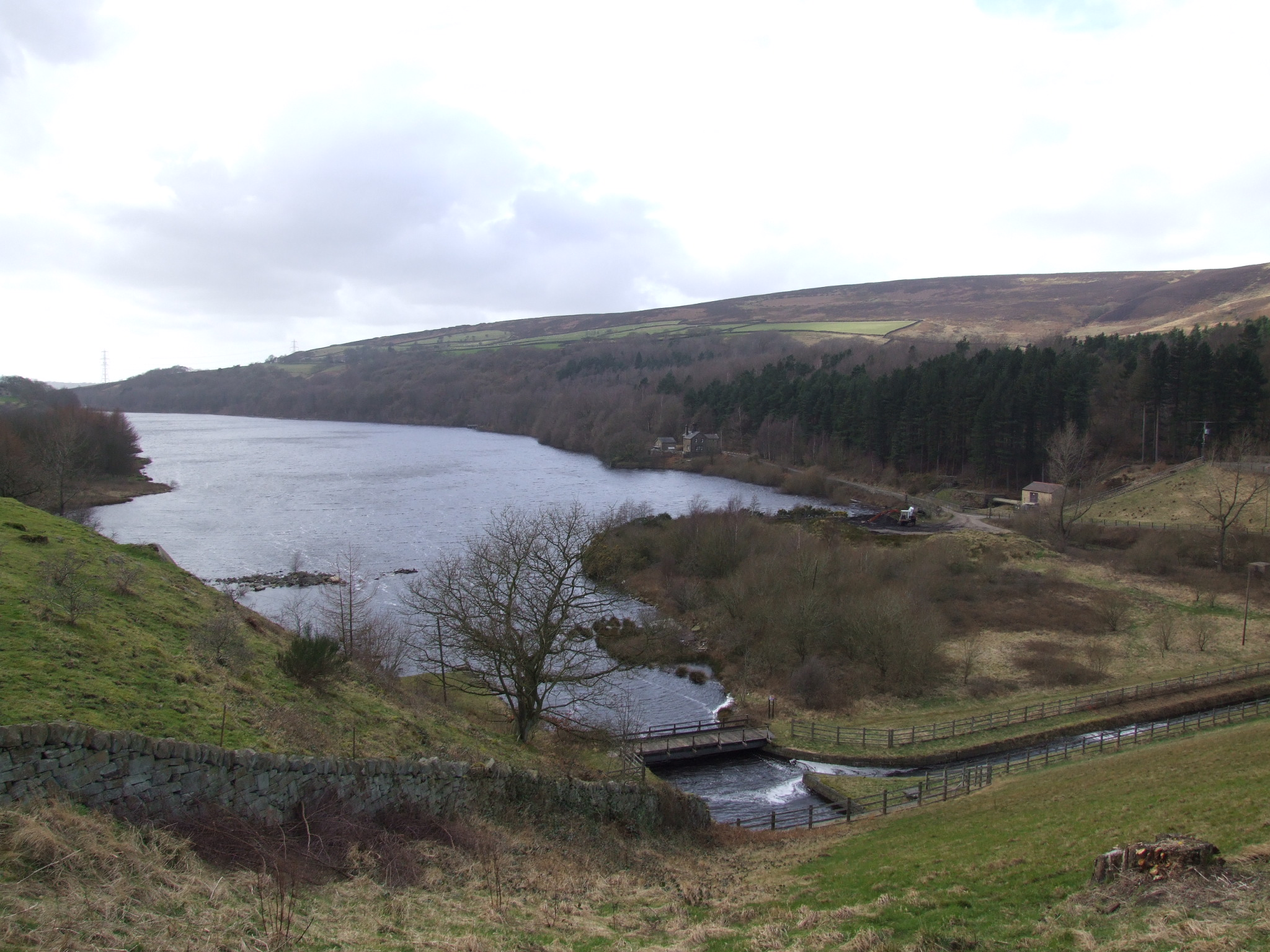
Valehouse

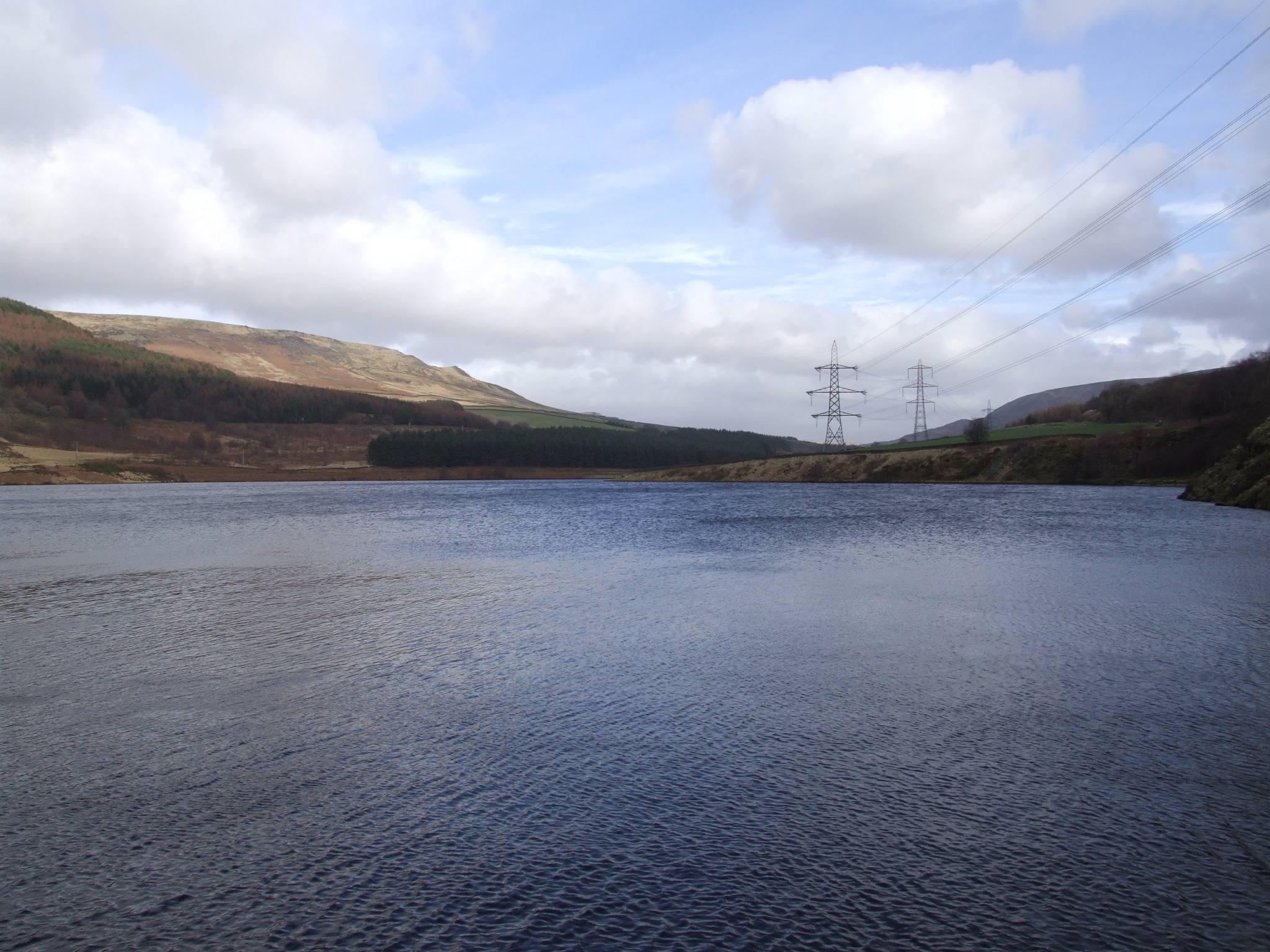
Rhodeswood

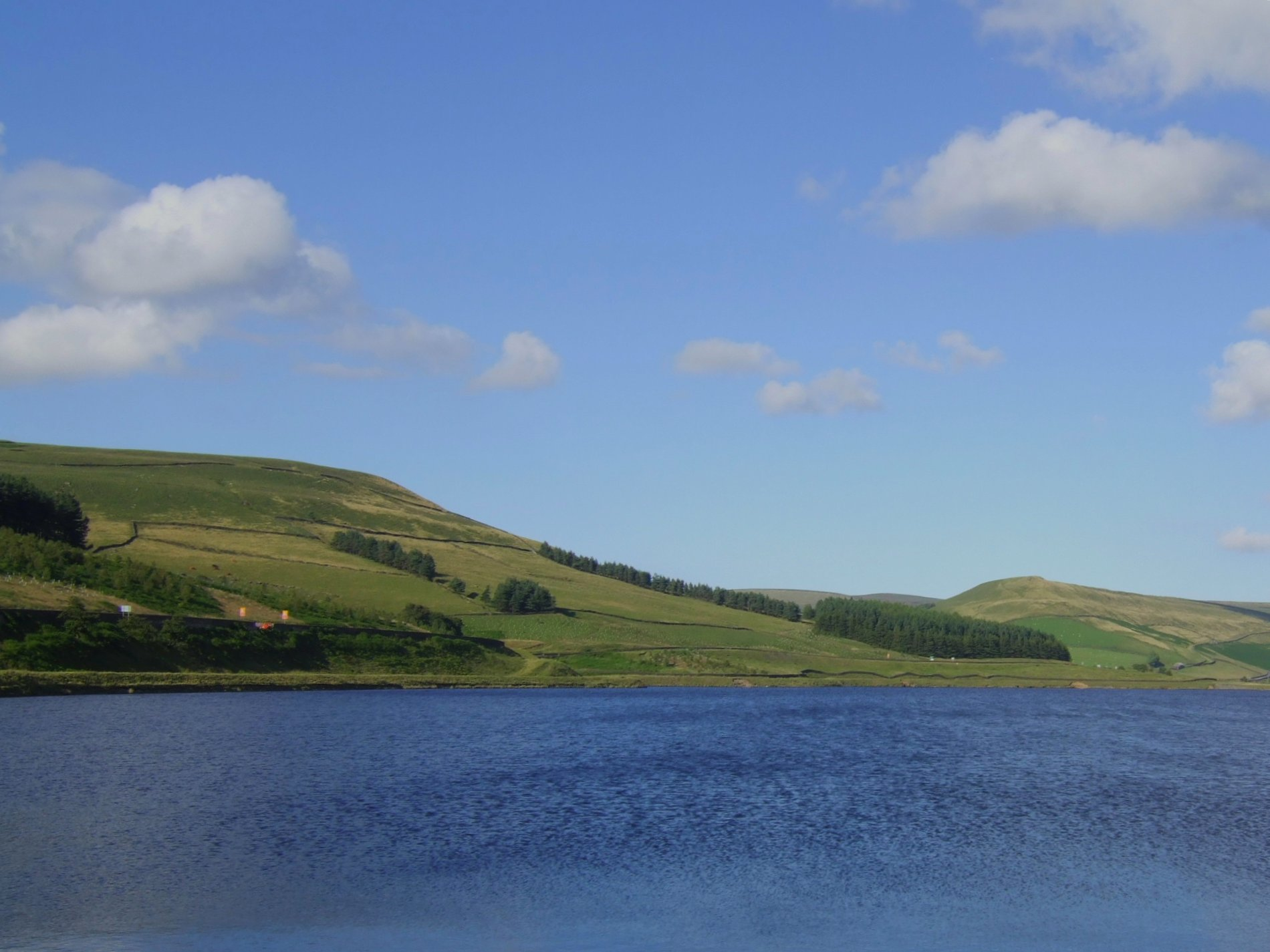
Woodhead

== History ==
=== The Romans ===
There is a Roman fortlet at Highstones on the south-facing slope overlooking Torside Reservoir. It is an oval-shaped area, with an obvious ditch, and about 82 yards (75 m) across. A footpath runs immediately to the north of it, and to the west is Highstones Farm. A Roman road may have run along the valley connecting it with Melandra Castle, in Glossop.

=== Feudal estates ===
The lordship of Longdendale was an ancient feudal estate encompassing the medieval manors of Godley, Hattersley, Hollingworth, Matley, Mottram, Newton, Staley, Tintwistle and Werneth. The lordship was created by the Earl of Chester in the late twelfth century; William de Neville was the first lord of Longdendale, as appointed by the Earl of Chester. Buckton Castle, near Carrbrook, was probably built by William de Neville in the late twelfth century and was also probably the centre of lordship of Longdendale, as it is the only castle within the lordship. One of the privileges of the lordship was to carry out trial by combat. The lordship of Longdendale was passed from de Neville to his son in law, Thomas de Burgh, upon his death in 1211.

The lordship reverted to the control of the crown in 1357 and remained under crown control until 1374. The lordship was given to Matilda Lovell and the Lovells controlled Longdendale until 1465, when control again reverted to the crown. The lordship was granted to Sir William Stanley in 1489; however, the lordship once again reverted to the crown when Stanley was executed in 1495 as a supporter of Perkin Warbeck. In 1554, the lordship was granted to Richard Wilbraham. Tollemache family inherited lordship of Longdendale from the Wilbrahams in the 1690s. It was part of the Hundred of Macclesfield. An estate survey, or 'Extent' of the lordship for 1360, was published by the Record Society of Lancashire and Cheshire in July 2005.

=== Salt trade ===
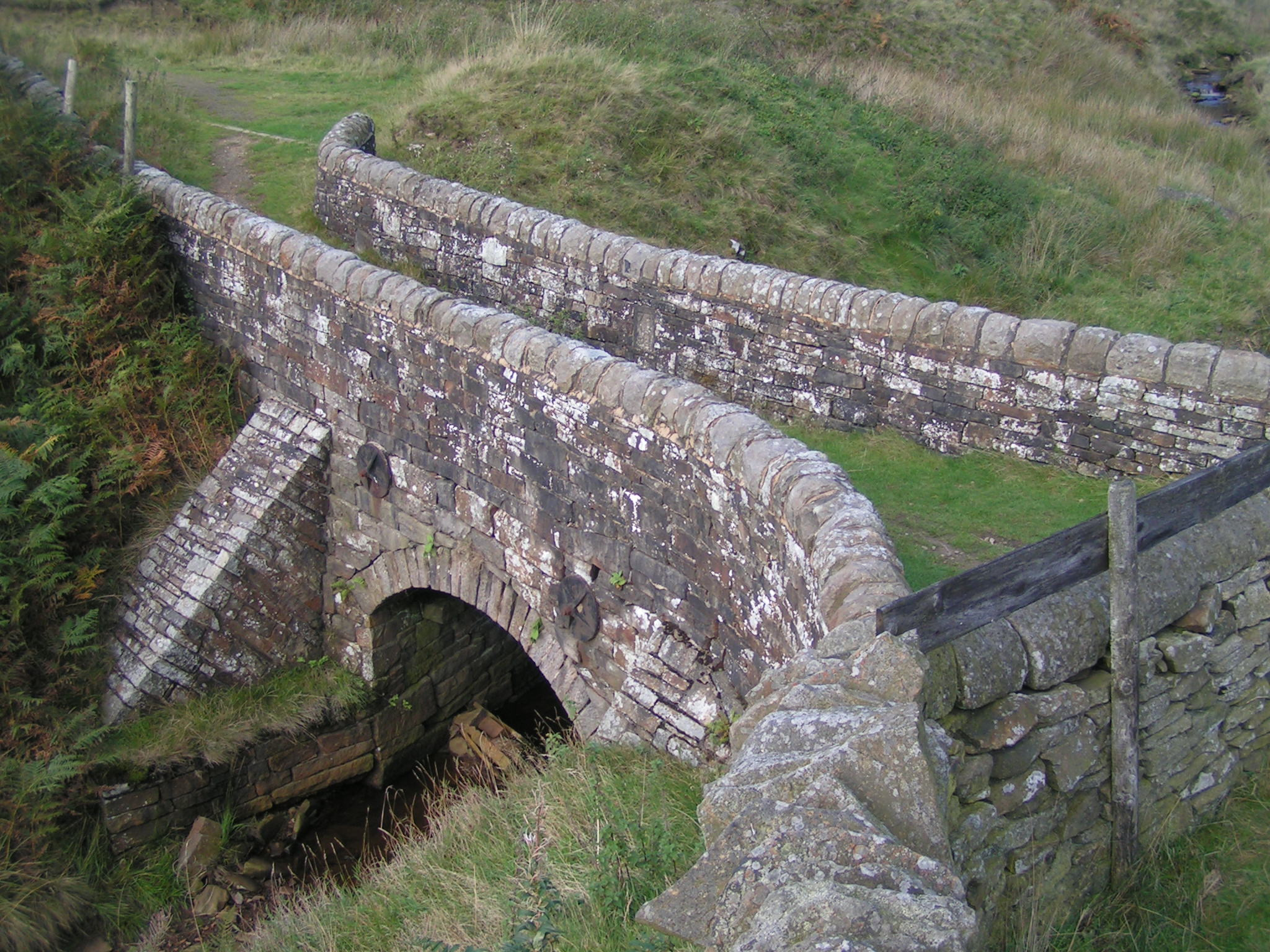
Lady Shaw Bridge

A packhorse route called a saltway was maintained from the Middle Ages onwards for the purpose of allowing the export of salt from the Cheshire wiches of Nantwich, Northwich and Middlewich across the Pennines. The passing trade brought prosperity to settlements along the route. The importance of the salt trade along such saltways is shown by surviving placenames; for example Salter's Brook (SK137999) is where the saltway forked, with one route leading to Wakefield and another to Barnsley.

The stone Lady Shaw Bridge is extant at this point, as do the ruins of an old inn. The bridge is just wide enough for a packhorse, though it is suspected that the bridge may have originally been wider and was deliberately narrowed when the Saltersbrook turnpike was built, to prevent vehicles bypassing the toll barrier.

=== Turnpike road ===
The turnpike road from Manchester to Saltersbrook connected to further turnpikes for Yorkshire destinations and was built in the mid-18th century, based on the older saltway route.

=== The reservoirs ===
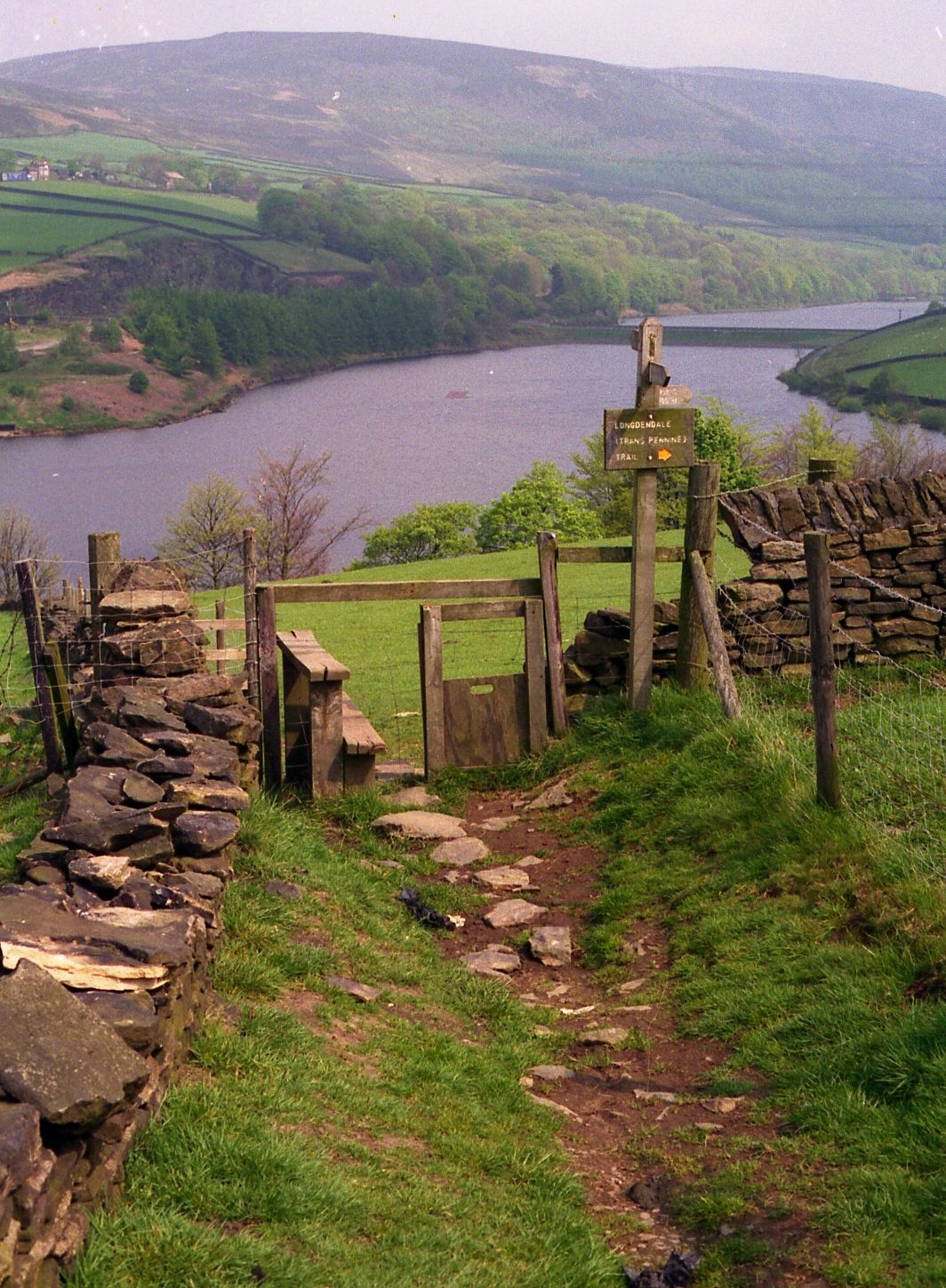
The view eastward up Longdendale from Padfield, in Derbyshire

The Longdendale catchment exceeds 30 square miles (78 km^{2}) and has an annual rainfall of 1,330 millimetres (52.5 in). The civil engineer John Frederick Bateman recognised the potential and conceived a plan to deliver this water to Manchester and Salford, while still maintaining the flow in the River Etherow that was needed to power the mills of Tintwistle and Glossop. The six reservoirs have a capacity of 20,000,000 m^{3} (4,500,000,000 imp gal). A tunnel was built at a depth of 200 feet (60 m) to carry the water from Longdendale into the valley of the River Tame. The Manchester Corporation Waterworks Act 1847 (10 & 11 Vict. c. cciii) was passed on 9 July 1847 to allow the land to be acquired and construction to commence.

=== The railway ===
The first railway line between Manchester and Sheffield was constructed between 1839 and 1845, on the south side of the reservoir chain, by 1,500 navvies of whom many died and most suffered illness. The three mile-long double Woodhead Tunnel was, for a time, the longest tunnel in the country. It was replaced by a single, larger tunnel in 1954. The first tunnel was subsequently used by Central Electricity Generating Board to reroute the main high-voltage link up the valley and through the National Park underground.

In 1970, passenger services between Hadfield and Penistone ceased. Whilst the Beeching Report recommended the closure of the Hope Valley Line and retention of the Woodhead Line, the government implemented the opposite. This was followed by the goods service in 1981, due to the falloff in trans-Pennine coal traffic. The track was lifted in 1986. There have been plans to reopen the railway at various times since it was closed, but none have gained planning approval.

== Recreation ==
=== Cycling and walking ===
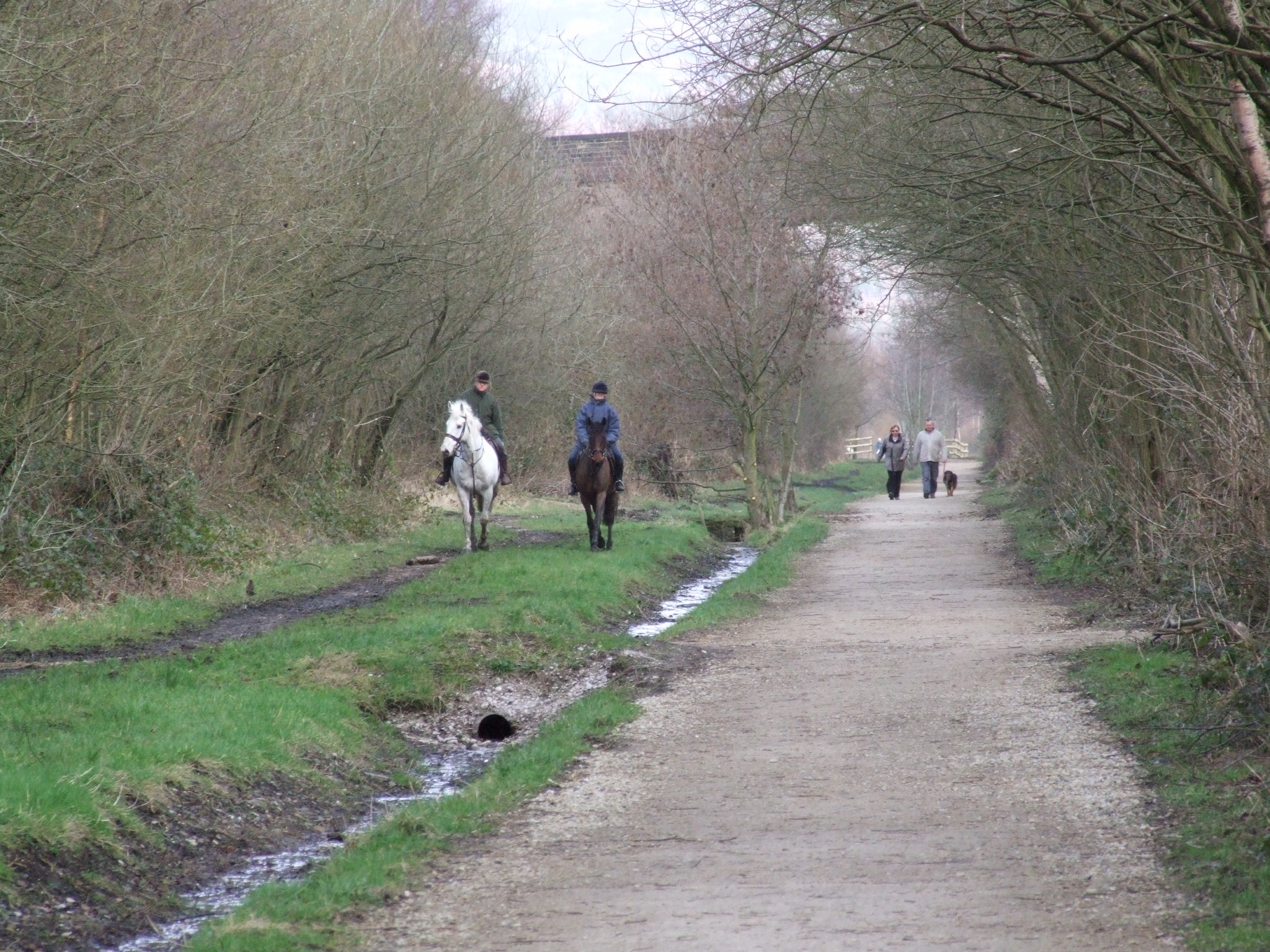
Walking and riding on the Longdendale Trail, March 2008

After the railway line was closed, the trackbed was taken up and the Longdendale Trail was constructed along its route. It is now part of the Trans-Pennine Trail and Sustrans' National Cycle Route 62 which, in turn, is part of the 2,000-mile (3,200 km) European walking route E8 from Liverpool to Istanbul.

Holme Moss and the Woodhead Pass were on the route of the 2014 Tour de France, during the second stage between York and Sheffield.

The Pennine Way crosses Longdendale, descending from Bleaklow to the south and ascending Black Hill to the north. The youth hostel at Crowden is a traditional stop after the first day's walk from Edale. The circular walk known as 'The Longdendale Edges' takes in the high ground (at about the 1,000–1,500-foot (300–460 m) level) on both sides of the valley. It is about 17 miles (27 km) long and is 'not recommended in doubtful weather'. The detailed route, clockwise from Crowden Youth Hostel, is given in Peak District Walking Guide No.2, published by the Peak Park Planning Board.

=== Sailing ===
Torside Reservoir is home to Glossop Sailing Club.

== Transport ==
=== Woodhead pass road ===
The M67 motorway starts at junction 24 of the M60 at Denton and heads east where it terminates at Mottram in Longdendale. There were plans in the 1960s to extend it through the National Park to the M1 motorway and Sheffield, but it was never built. From here, the A628 runs through the valley to join the A616.

The Woodhead Pass is a major freight route and is often congested, which has created traffic problems at its western end. The Mottram to Tintwistle by-pass is intended to relieve the congestion; work began to build the by-pass in 2024 and it is scheduled to be completed by 2028.

== Governance ==
The valley gave its name to the Longdendale Urban District, which covered the western part of the valley around Mottram and Hollingworth. That district was created in 1936, as one of the districts of Cheshire, and was abolished in 1974 when its area became part of the metropolitan borough of Tameside, in Greater Manchester.

Traditionally, Longdendale was in the County palatine of Chester. Up until local government reforms in 1974, Longdendale Urban District, along with Tintwistle Rural District, formed part of the administrative county of Cheshire; the Municipal Borough of Glossop was in Derbyshire; and Penistone Rural District was in the West Riding of Yorkshire. Today, the valley is split between the Metropolitan Borough of Barnsley in South Yorkshire, the Borough of High Peak in Derbyshire, and the Metropolitan Borough of Tameside in Greater Manchester.

== Longdendale lights ==
The valley and the surrounding area has a reputation for strange phenomena, including unexplained lights and allegedly supernatural apparitions and has become a centre of attention for UFO and ghost hunters. However, it has been suggested that the lights may be earth lights produced by pressure on the underlying rocks.

== See also ==
- Listed buildings in Longdendale
