= Bottoms Reservoir (Derbyshire) =

Reservoir in Derbyshire, England

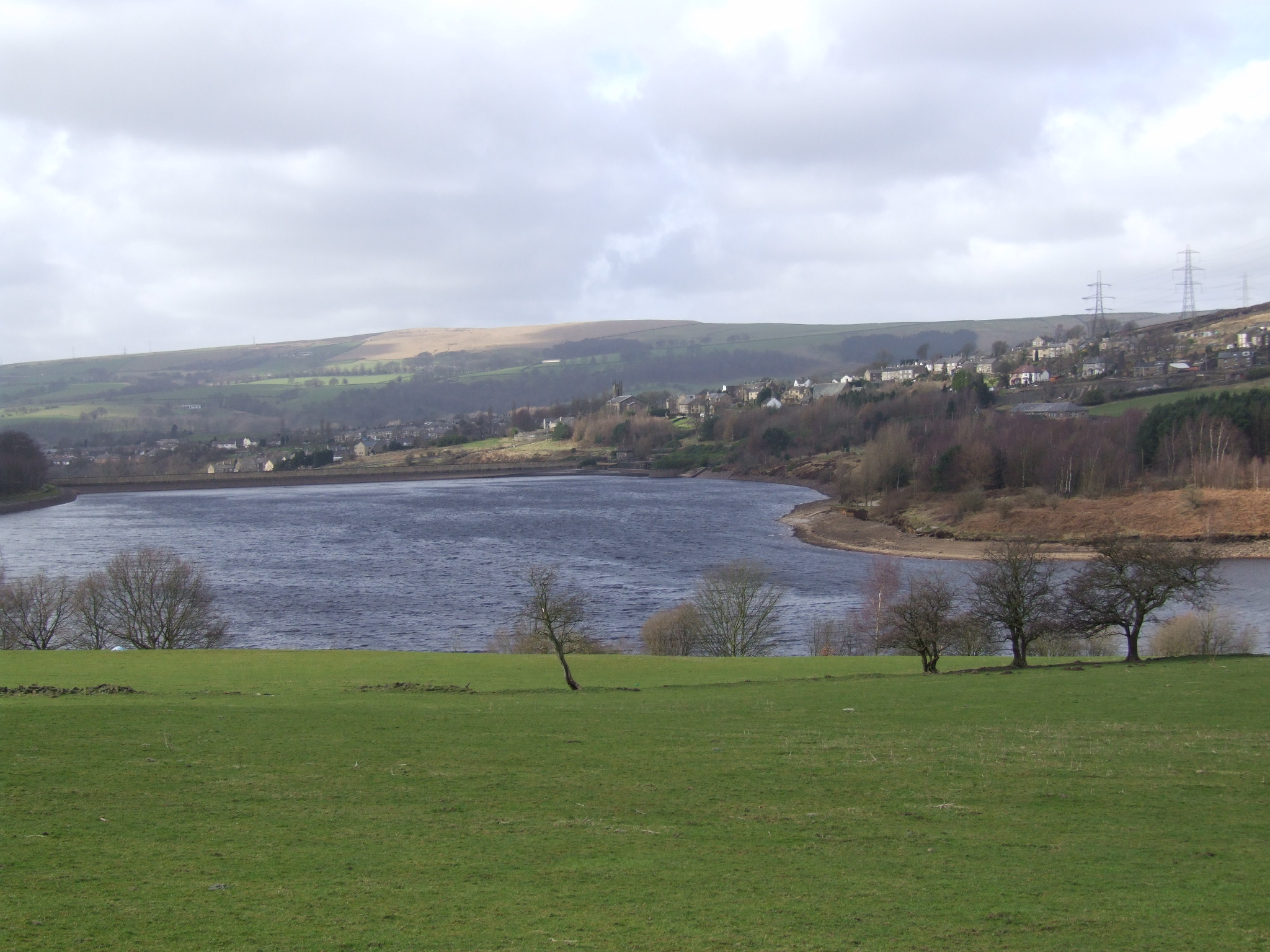
- (March 2008)

- Location within Derbyshire
- Location: North Derbyshire, England
- Coordinates: 53.469°N 1.961°W
- Lake type: compensation reservoir
- Basin countries: United Kingdom
- Surface area: 50 acres (20 ha)
- Average depth: 48 ft (15 m)
- Water volume: 2,400 acre-feet (650,000,000 imp gal)
- Surface elevation: 486 ft (148 m)

Bottoms Reservoir is a man-made lake in Longdendale in north Derbyshire, England. It was constructed between 1865 and 1877, by John Frederick Bateman as part of the Longdendale Chain of reservoirs to supply water from the River Etherow to the urban areas of Greater Manchester. The upper reservoirs supplied the drinking water, while Bottoms and Vale House reservoirs regulated the flow downstream for the benefit of local water-powered mills.

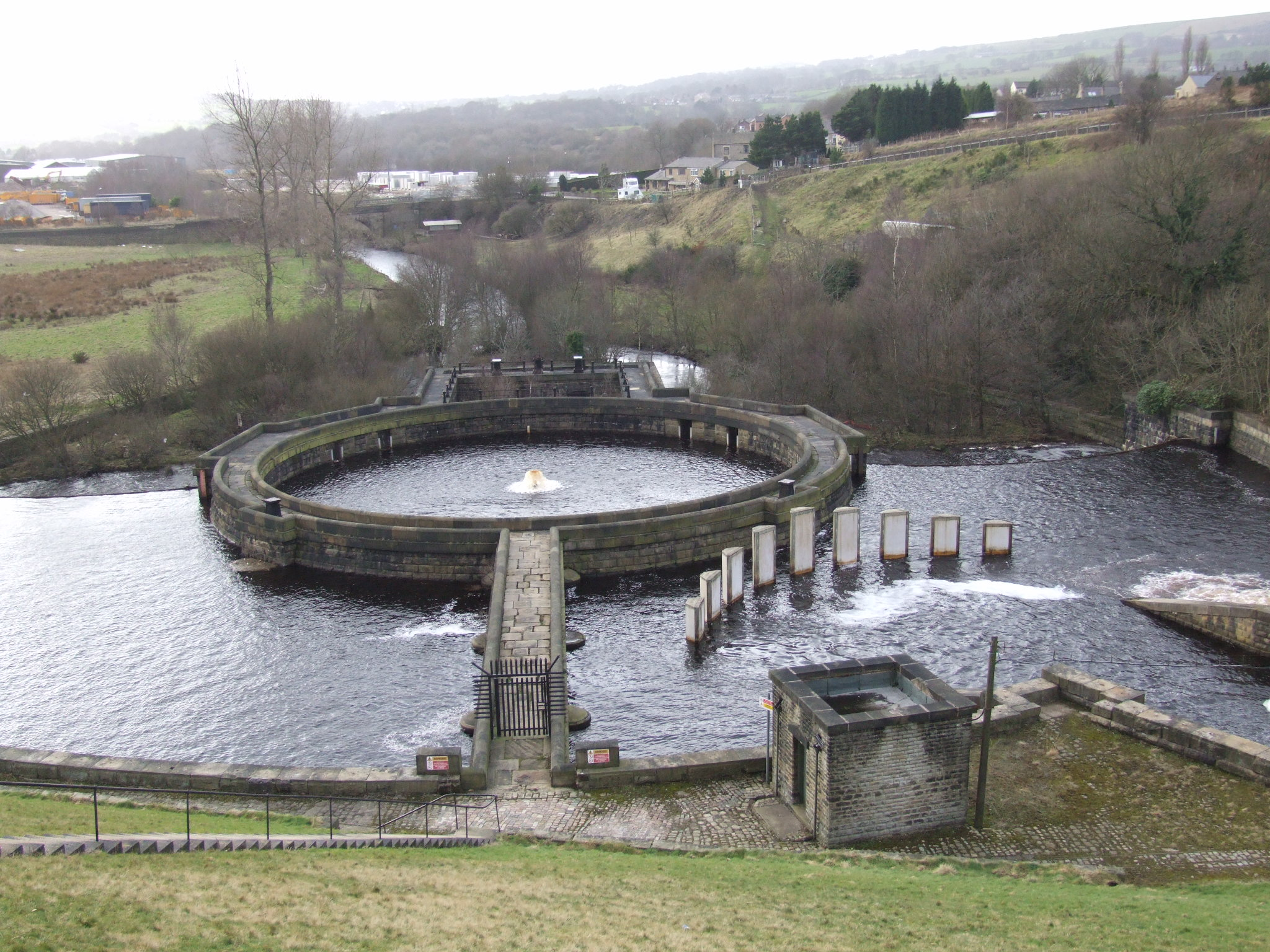
The Gauging Basin

The reservoir was obliged to release ten million gallons a day. To ensure this, a gauging basin 40 feet (12 m) in diameter was built. The drinking water flowed through the Mottram Tunnel to the Godley covered reservoir.

The Peak District Boundary Walk runs along the south-western side of the reservoir and over the dam.

== History ==
In 1877, turbines were introduced at Bottoms to produce electricity that powered the company offices and the works electric train. These operated for 28 years.

In 1998, remedial safety work was undertaken. The clay core and crest was raised by 2.5 metres (8 ft 2 in), and a dry metalled track constructed on the crest. The bywash channel bridge was replaced to give greater clearance, and the stonework of the bywash channel and the tumbling bay was repointed.

Preceded by Arnfield Reservoir	Longdendale Chain Reservoirs (West to East)	Succeeded by Valehouse Reservoir
