= River Etherow =

River in north west England

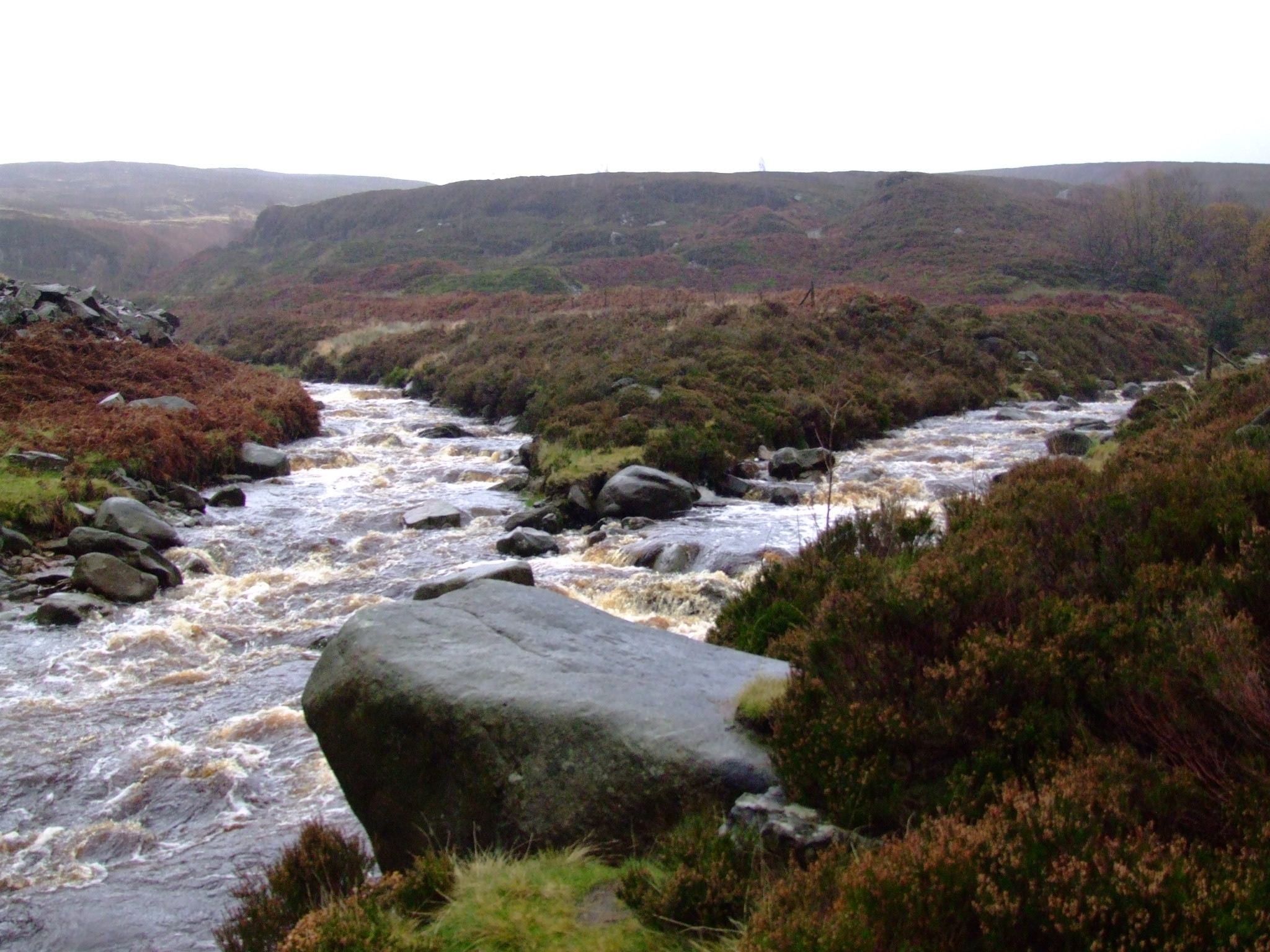
- The Etherow (left), joined by the Black Cloughs from Bleaklow.

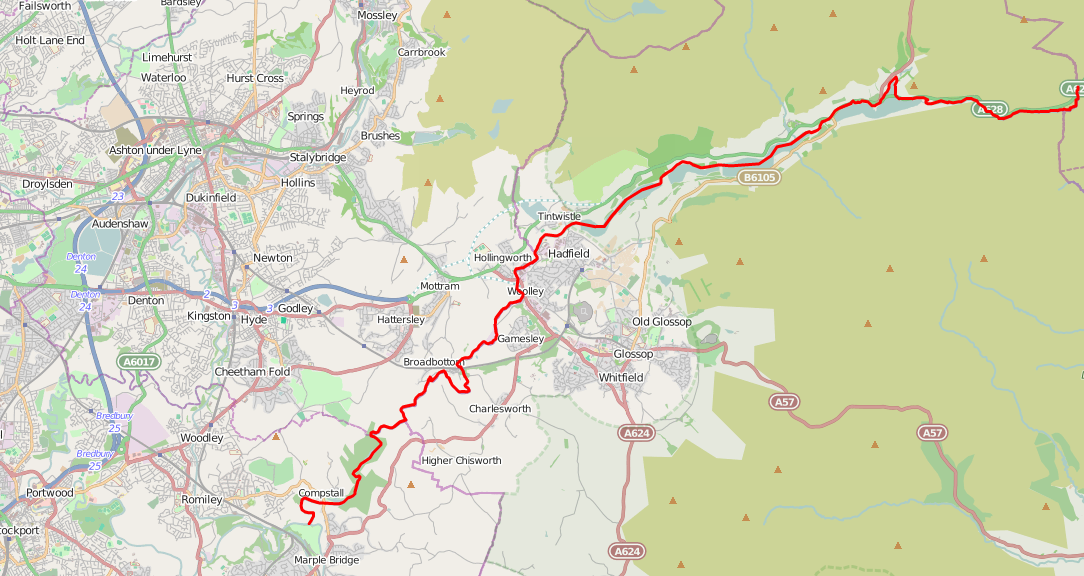
- The River Etherow is highlighted in red (click to enlarge); Coordinates: 53.464956°N 1.980954°W

Location
- Country: England

Physical characteristics
- Source
  - location: Featherbed Moss, South Yorkshire
  - elevation: 500 m (1,600 ft)
- Mouth
  - location: River Goyt
  - elevation: 80 m (260 ft)
- Length: 30 km (19 mi)
- Basin size: 77.7 km^{2} (30.0 sq mi)

The River Etherow in northern England is a tributary of the River Goyt. Although now passing through South Yorkshire, Derbyshire and Greater Manchester, it historically formed the ancient county boundary between Cheshire and Derbyshire. The upper valley is known as Longdendale. The river has a watershed of approximately 30 square miles (78 km^{2}), and the area an annual rainfall of 52.5 inches (1,330 mm).

== Course ==
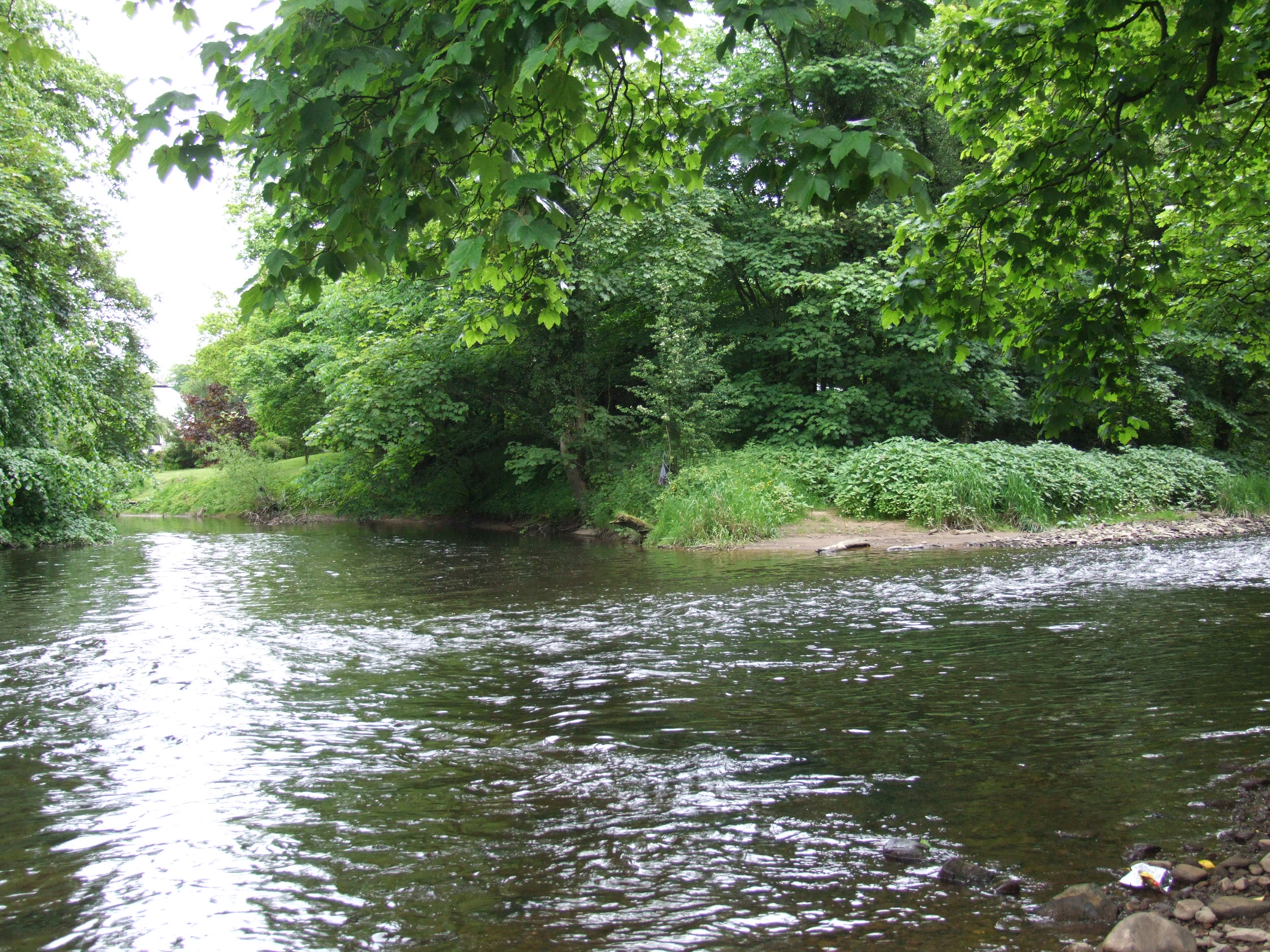
Destination: The Etherow enters the River Goyt, flowing from right to left

Rising in the Redhole Spring and Wike Head area of Pikenaze Moor in Derbyshire, the river broadens into the Longdendale Chain of reservoirs in the Peak District National Park. It emerges again in Tintwistle, Derbyshire, at the foot of Bottoms Reservoir dam and passes Melandra Castle in Gamesley, where it is joined by Glossop Brook. The Etherow enters the borough of Tameside at Hollingworth in Greater Manchester, passing into Stockport where it passes through Etherow Country Park. It flows into the River Goyt at Brabyns Park near Marple.

The modern accepted start of the River Mersey is at the confluence of the Tame and Goyt, in central Stockport, 4 miles (6 km) downstream. However, older definitions, and many older maps, place its start at the confluence of the Etherow and Goyt; for example the 1911 Encyclopædia Britannica states "It is formed by the junction of the Goyt and the Etherow a short distance below Marple in Cheshire on the first-named stream." John Stockdale's map published on 12 April 1794 shows the Mersey River extending to at least Mottram, and forming the boundary between Cheshire and Derbyshire.

== Natural history ==
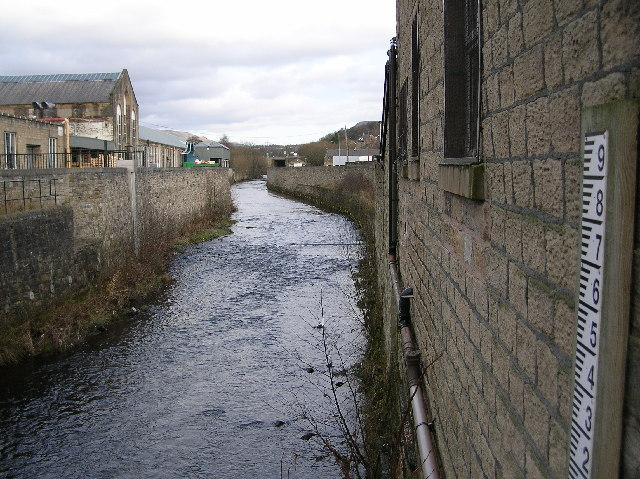
The river in Hollingworth

The upper reaches of the River Etherow pass through peat moorland, inhabited by red foxes, voles and an introduced population of mountain hare. Red grouse, ring ouzel, wheatear and golden plover may be seen. Kestrels, merlins and short-eared owls nest here. The reservoirs attract mallards, and also teal, pochard, common sandpipers, black-headed gulls and Canada geese. The woodlands are home to redstart, great spotted woodpecker, and spotted flycatcher. Water rail have been recorded at Etherow Country Park.

== Geology ==
A schematic diagram of the rocks beneath the Etherow

Longdendale is a steep-sided V-shaped valley that is glacial in origin. Longdendale is in the Dark Peak, where a thick blanket of peat overlies the Millstone Grit sandstone, formed on a bed of shale through which flows the Etherow. Directly beneath the upper valley lie areas of Carboniferous Millstone Grit, shales and sandstone. It is on the edge of the Peak District Dome, at the southern edge of the Pennine anticline. The Variscan uplift has caused much faulting and Glossopdale was the product of glacial action in the last glaciation period that exploited the weakened rocks. The steep-sided valleys of the cloughs cause significant erosion and deposition. The layers of sandstone, mudstones and shale in the bedrock act as an aquifer to feed the springs. The valley bottoms have a thin deposit of boulder clay. The brooks are fed by the peaty soils of the moors and are, therefore, acidic (pH5.5–7.0).

== History ==
The Etherow valley was an important trans-Pennine route, and in AD 78 the Romans under Agricola built the fort of Ardotalia (later known as Melandra or Melandra Castle) to defend it. The Mercians settled at Hollingworth about 650 AD. Many placenames of the area date from this period; for example, Mottram and Glossop. At the time of Domesday (1086) the river was firmly established as the boundary between Cheshire and Derbyshire, but the name Edrow or Etherow applied to this upper reach of the Mersey cannot be dated earlier than c.1772.

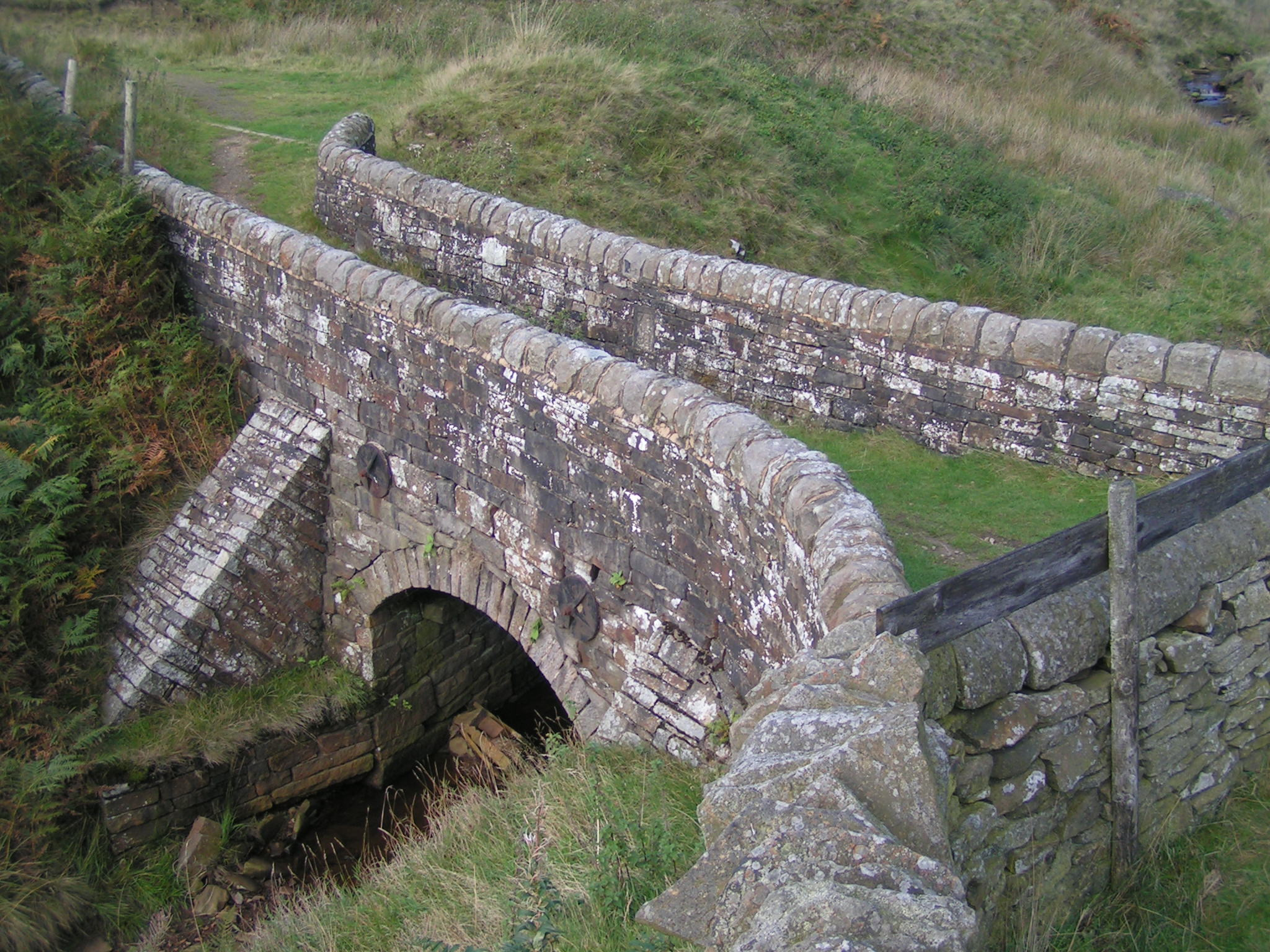
Lady Shaw Bridge

A packhorse route (known as a saltway) was maintained from the Middle Ages onwards to allow the export of salt from the Cheshire towns of Nantwich, Northwich and Middlewich across the Pennines. The saltway followed the Etherow to Ladyshaw, and at Salters Brook (SK137999) it forked, with one route leading to Wakefield and another to Barnsley.

Water was an important source of power for industry, and the Etherow and its tributaries were fast flowing and constant. Watermills were used to grind meal and to full woollen cloth (Littlemoor 1781). Wool was transported along the turnpike road (1731) that ran from Ashton-under-Lyne, Stalybridge, Mottram, Woodhead and Lady's Cross to Sheffield, to be woven on hand-looms in the dale.

From 1782 to 1820, water-powered cotton mills were built along many brooks feeding the Etherow, including six on the Glossop side of the river. With the adoption of steam to power the ever-larger mills, built closer to the coal fields, the river assumed a new role as a source of water for Manchester and Salford. In 1844 John Frederick Bateman advised Manchester Corporation that the River Etherow, which rose at the highest point of the Pennine chain, could provide water, collected in purpose-built reservoirs, "nearly as pure as if it comes from the heavens." This led to the construction of the Longdendale Chain of reservoirs, the first scheme of its type in the world. Three reservoirs were built on the Etherow to impound drinking water, with another two to provide compensation water for the mills downstream.

=== Etymology ===
The name Etherow could be of Brittonic Celtic origin and derived from the ancient term *ador, meaning "watercourse, channel". The settlement-name Tintwistle, however, implies that Etherow may be an Old English replacement for an earlier name of the *Tin- type (see River Tyne), derived from the hydronym *edre, which is possibly related to ēdre, "vein".

== Economy ==
The Longdendale Chain of reservoirs comprises three impounding reservoirs, Woodhead Reservoir, Torside Reservoir and Rhodeswood Reservoir, supplying 24,000,000 imperial gallons (110 Ml) of water a day by gravity to Manchester and Salford, and 6,600,000 imperial gallons (30 Ml) to Hyde and Denton through the Mottram tunnel. Valehouse Reservoir and Bottoms Reservoir are compensating reservoirs which have a combined holding capacity of 4,200,000,000 imperial gallons (19,000 Ml).

=== Woodhead railway line ===
The Woodhead Line, which followed the river from Hadfield to the Woodhead Tunnel portal, was an important cross-Pennine route built in 1844 by the Sheffield, Ashton-under-Lyne and Manchester Railway. Three tunnels of 4,840 metres (15,880 ft) were dug, connecting Woodhead with Dunford Bridge on the River Don. Though now closed to railway traffic, one tunnel is used to route electricity cables for the National Grid, with work in progress to use a second tunnel for a new cable, thus preventing the re-establishment of rail traffic.

== Recreation ==
=== Walking and cycling ===
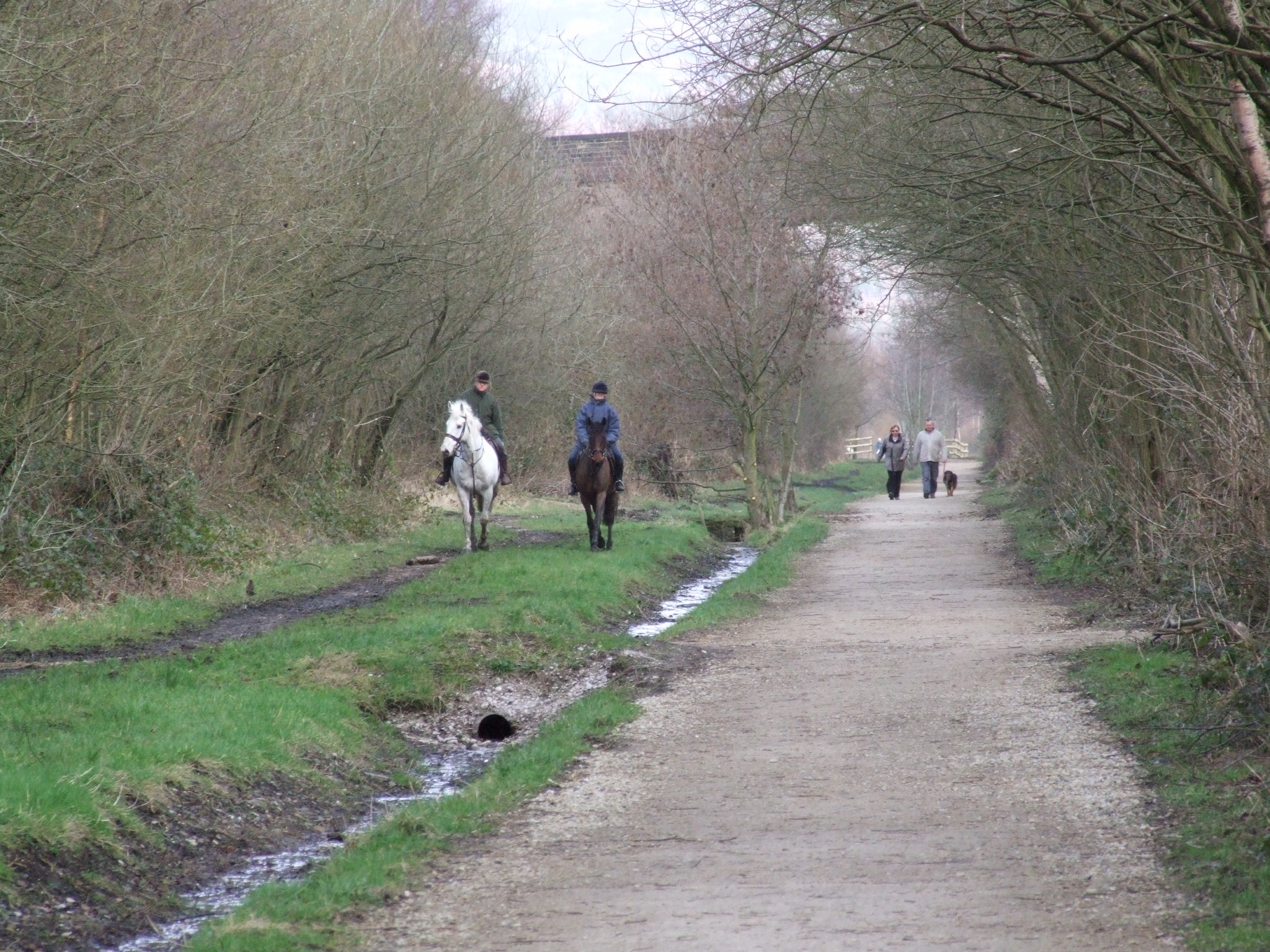
Walking and riding on the Longdendale Trail, March 2008

Following the closure of the railway line, the trackbed was taken up and the Longdendale Trail constructed along its route. This is now part of the Trans-Pennine Trail, Sustrans National Cycle Route 62. This, in its turn, is part of the 2,000 miles (3,200 km) European walking route E8 from Liverpool to Istanbul. The Pennine Way crosses Longdendale, descending from Bleaklow to the south and ascending Black Hill to the north. The youth hostel at Crowden is a traditional stop after the first day's walking, from Edale.

The circular walk known as 'The Longdendale Edges' takes in the high ground (at about the 1,000 feet (300 m)-1,500 feet (460 m) level) on both sides of the valley. It is about 17 miles (27 km) long and is 'not recommended in doubtful weather'. The detailed route, clockwise from Crowden Youth Hostel, is given in Peak District Walking Guide No.2, published by the Peak Park Planning Board.

=== Sailing ===
Torside Reservoir is home to Glossop & District Sailing Club and Etherow Country Park is the home to Etherow Country Park Sailing Club.

=== Country park ===
Etherow Country Park, in Compstall, close to the mouth of the Etherow, opened in 1968 as one of the UK's first country parks. Originally it was an industrial area incorporating a mine, a mill and a mill pond. The River Etherow flows through the park and is the source for the mill pond. Etherow Country Park is associated with many local groups, including a small local community group, the Friends of Etherow, anglers, the afore-mentioned sailing club, and a model boat club.

Compstall Nature Reserve is a 12.8-hectare (32-acre) region of the park which is designated a Site of Special Scientific Interest (SSSI). The area was given the designation in 1977 for its biological interest, in particular its wide range of habitats, including open water, tall fen, reed swamp, carr and mixed deciduous woodland.

== Tributaries and route map ==
The Etherow has no major tributaries; it is fed by numerous brooks and streams from the cloughs flowing off Kinder Scout, Bleaklow and Black Hill. Minor left tributaries are:

- Black Clough
- Shining Clough
- Wildboar Clough
- Torside Clough
- Glossop Brook

- Shell Brook
- Hurst Brook
- Gnats Hole Brook

- Chisworth Brook
- Mortin Clough

Minor right tributaries are:

- Salters Brook
- Heyden Brook
- Crowden Brook
- Hollingworth Brook

- Arnfield Brook
- Ogden Brook

- Gigg Brook

== See also ==
- List of rivers in the Peak District
- Rivers of the United Kingdom
- List of mills in Longdendale and Glossopdale
