= Black Chew Head =

Highest point of Greater Manchester

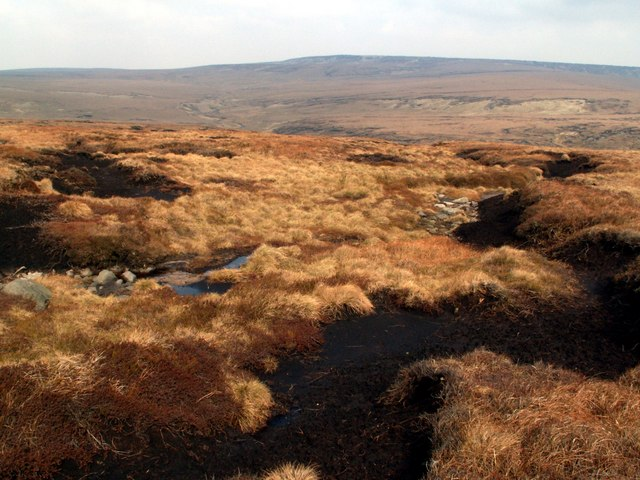
- Moorland just north of Black Chew Head

Highest point
- Elevation: 542 m (1,778 ft)
- Prominence: 35 m (115 ft)
- Parent peak: Black Hill
- Listing: County top, Dewey
- Coordinates: 53°30′57.96″N 1°55′17.76″W

Geography
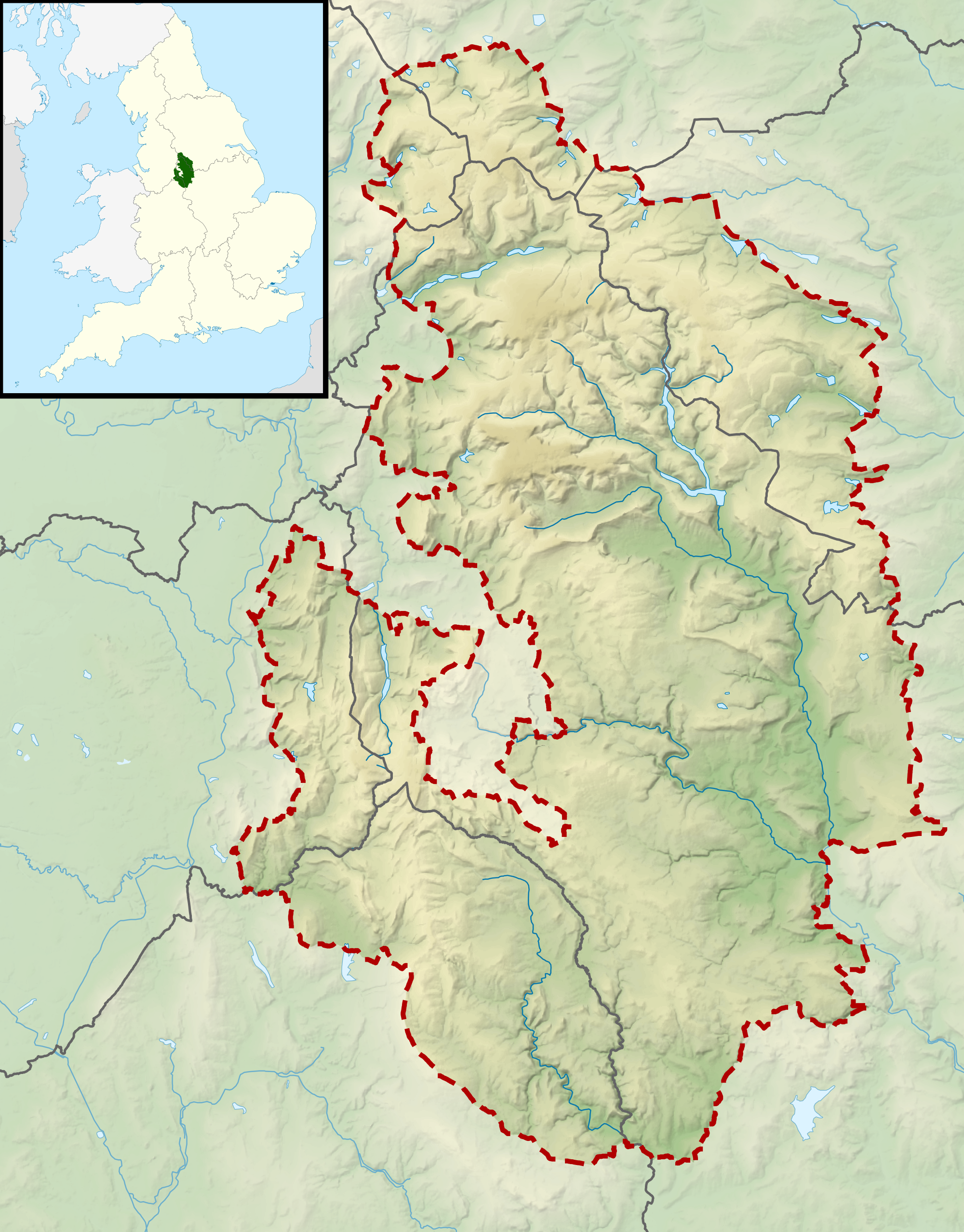
- Location within the Peak District Location within Greater Manchester
- Location: Saddleworth, Greater Manchester, England
- Parent range: Peak District (Dark Peak)
- OS grid: SE056019

Black Chew Head in Saddleworth in the Metropolitan Borough of Oldham is the highest point or county top of Greater Manchester in northern England. It stands on moorland on the edge of the Peak District at a height of 542 m (1,778 ft) above sea level, close to the border with the High Peak district of Derbyshire.

Historically in the West Riding of Yorkshire (along with the rest of Saddleworth), it became a county top in 1974 on the creation of Greater Manchester following the Local Government Act 1972.

== Location and access ==
Black Chew Head is an outlying part of Black Hill, meaning Kinder Scout is its parent peak. It overlooks the Chew Valley, which leads eastwards and northwards to Dovestones Reservoir, and the valley of Crowden Great Brook leading south to Longdendale. The hill is accessible by many routes: the most used and most obvious is from Dovestones Reservoir in Greenfield via the Chew Reservoir access road. The hill is also accessible from Crowden in Derbyshire and from the A635 to the north. The Pennine Way runs just to the east of the summit on its way from Crowden to Black Hill. The summit lies a short distance east of the June 2018 wildfire on Saddleworth Moor, but was not within the burned area.
