= David Lytton =

English suicide victim

- Born: David Keith Lautenberg; 21 April 1948; London, England
- Died: 11 or 12 December 2015 (aged 67); Saddleworth Moor, West Riding of Yorkshire
- Cause of death: Suicide via strychnine poisoning
- Other name: Neil Dovestone (placeholder name)
- Occupations: Train driver, card dealer

David Lytton (21 April 1948 – 11 or 12 December 2015), formerly known as David Keith Lautenberg and after the discovery of his body by the placeholder name Neil Dovestone, was a previously unidentified British man found dead on Saddleworth Moor, in the South Pennines of Northern England on 12 December 2015. The placeholder name was reportedly devised by mortuary attendants at Royal Oldham Hospital, with reference to the location the body was found near Dove Stone Reservoir, on an asphalt track in the Chew Valley.

== Mystery body ==
The man later identified as Lytton died from a lethal dose of strychnine, and is believed by police to have died by suicide. He was estimated to be between 65 and 75 years old and was almost 6 feet (1.8 m) tall, with a thin build; he was balding with grey hair and brown eyes.

Signs that the man had been in Pakistan not long before his death included a 10-centimetre (3.9 in) titanium surgical plate, only available legally in Pakistan, attached to his left femur near the hip, and a container used to carry the strychnine, originally used for a common medication (thyroxine), had a printed label with text in English and Urdu. The man was not known to the authorities in Pakistan and his fingerprints did not match any on record in Pakistan, the UK or other countries. No evidence linking him to missing persons cases was found.

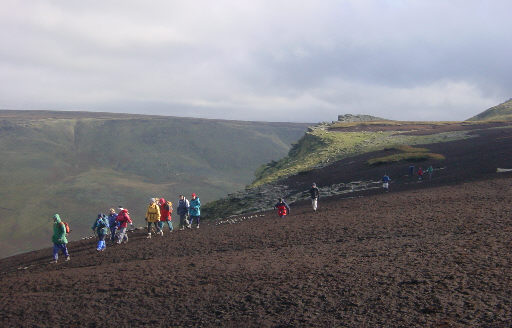
Wimberry Stones, also known as "Indian's Head", where the body was found

At 9:04 am on 11 December the unidentified man travelled by London Underground train from Ealing Broadway station to Euston station in London and then to Manchester Piccadilly. He walked to the moor on the afternoon of 11 December, from Greenfield, where he made enquiries at the Clarence pub about walking to Wimberry Stones. He was seen alive shortly after sunset (3:59 pm), by two Royal Society for the Protection of Birds staff, near the site at which his body was found the following day.

Wimberry Stones is a rock feature known locally as "Indian's Head" overlooking the reservoir. It was the site of a fatal aeroplane crash in 1949. Investigating detectives surmised the man may have been Stephen Evans, a survivor of the crash, but it was discounted after the BBC worked out, based on the 1949 report and the police statement, that he worked at the London School of Hygiene and Tropical Medicine and contacted him. He then contacted Greater Manchester Police to confirm he was still alive.

== Identification and following investigation ==
In January 2017 the body was identified as 67-year-old David Lytton, a former resident of London, who had flown into Heathrow Airport from Lahore in Pakistan on 10 December 2015. He was identified from photographs from a passenger list and images from CCTV in London. Greater Manchester Police confirmed his identity using DNA matching, characterising him as "a bit of a loner" who "liked his own company". Several witnesses subsequently described Lytton as living a minimalist lifestyle and reinforced the impression that he enjoyed living alone and keeping to himself. His brother, Jeremy Lawton, said that Lytton had meticulously "compartmentalised" his life in a way that his friends and family would not interact. Similarly, Salim Aktar, a close friend of Lytton for more than 30 years, did not know that Lytton had a girlfriend, Maureen Toogood.

Lytton had lived in Streatham, south London, from the 1980s until he moved to Pakistan in 2006. Former neighbours said he was a croupier who had once worked as a train driver for London Underground and after being made redundant from the casino had taken in lodgers, one of whom was of Pakistani appearance. The article reproduced personal information from Lytton's passport, showing a London birthplace and a birth date of 21 April 1948. The passport was issued on 8 September 2006 and would expire on 8 September 2016. The article reported that Lytton had arrived in Lahore on 6 October 2006, leaving almost six months later for Dubai. He returned to Lahore after four days, on 31 March 2007. The following November he left again, but there was no record of his returning.

Further details emerged in articles in The Guardian during February 2017. On 4 February, it was reported that Lytton's long-term girlfriend, Maureen Toogood, also from Streatham, had helped him through bouts of depression. He had a brother and he changed his surname following a family feud. (His change of name explained previous reports that no one named David Lytton had been born in London on 21 April 1948.) On 9 February The Guardian gave his former name as David Lautenberg and revealed that he had family living in England, including a brother living in North London. His parents were also identified as Sylvia and Hyman Lautenberg. Sylvia Lautenberg's family was of Jewish descent, had emigrated from Poland to England in about 1901, and had lived in or near East London. The family changed their name to Lawton in 1969.

In March 2017 the BBC reported additional details, many of them taken from interviews with Maureen Toogood and various sources in the London area, as well as Pakistan. According to the BBC, Lytton and Toogood met in 1968 when Lytton worked as a croupier in Mayfair. He had recently left Leeds University where he had studied psychology and sociology but did not graduate. He held different jobs later on and his last employment in London was as a train driver for London Underground. Lytton and Toogood became a couple and conceived a child but Toogood had a miscarriage which Lytton did not take well. They separated at some point and Toogood married someone else, but they stayed in touch, and Toogood visited Lytton regularly and helped around the house. According to her, Lytton was interested in religions, including Islam and Buddhism. In 2006 he sold his house, without telling Toogood. When he had suddenly left Toogood suspected he had gone to the United States, but he had in fact relocated to Hassan Town, a neighbourhood in Lahore, Pakistan. There he led a secluded life but was in regular contact with neighbours, whom he told he had converted to Islam in 1996, a statement police did not confirm. When he returned to London on 10 December 2015 he was received by a friend at the airport and who told the police Lytton planned to spend some time travelling around.

At the coroner's inquest on 14 March 2017 police reported that Lytton had repeated visa problems while living in Pakistan. His visa expired and he attempted to leave the country with a manipulated visa and got caught which resulted in him getting blacklisted. He eventually obtained a new visa that was about to expire in late 2015 when he was travelling to London, meaning it was his last chance to leave legally without having to reapply. Lytton's brother, Jeremy Lawton, reported he had not been in contact with his brother for over a decade, but believed he was living in the United States after receiving several letters he had posted from there. Lytton's long-time friend, Salim Aktar, said that they had travelled to Pakistan together three times. He was the friend who Lytton had asked to pick him up at the airport upon his return.

In 2020 it was speculated that Lytton's interest in the area of Oldham was due to poster advertising in London's public transportation which he must have often seen for years while working as a train driver.

Maureen Toogood was recovering from a stroke at the time of Lytton's identification and died in 2020.

== See also ==
- List of solved missing person cases (post-2000)

BBC Sounds Podcast Episode 7: Solved. 'Body on the Moor' Released on Radio 4 15 March 2017.
