= Greenfield Valley =

Valley at Saddleworth Moor in the Peak District

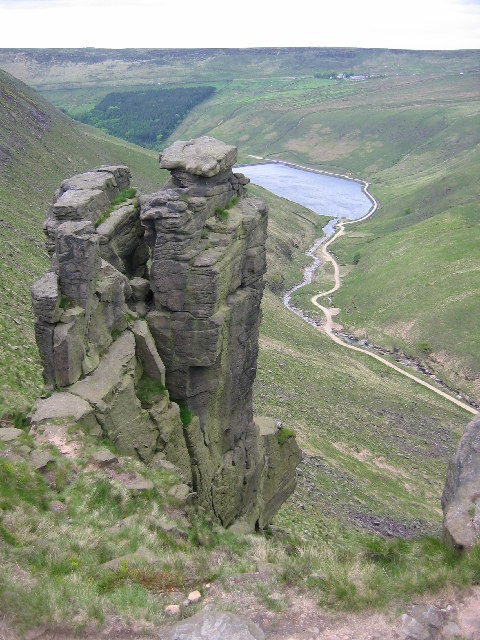
- Trinnacle above Greenfield Reservoir
- Length: 2.5 miles (4.0 km)
- Depth: 250 metres (820 ft)

Geography
- Location: Greater Manchester, England
- Coordinates: 53.5451°N 1.9616°W
- Rivers: Greenfield Brook
- Interactive map of Greenfield Valley

Greenfield Valley is a river valley through Saddleworth Moor in England's Peak District National Park. Historically this area of the South Pennines was part of Yorkshire but since 1974 it has been within the eastern edge of the county of Greater Manchester.

The valley and the surrounding Saddleworth Moor are designated as 'Open Access' land for the public, following the Countryside and Rights of Way Act 2000. Much of Saddleworth Moor is a 9,000 year-old peat landscape of blanket bog. The upper Greenfield Valley is part of the Dark Peak SSSI (Site of Special Scientific Interest). The millstone grit moorland is typically covered with grasses, mosses, heather and bilberry and is habitat for mountain hares and moorland birds such as red grouse, lapwing, skylark, curlew, golden plover and meadow pipit. The RSPB operates Dove Stone Nature Reserve in the valley, which includes old quarry cliffs that are home to peregrine falcons.

The Trinnacle is a dramatic large stack of three gritstone pillars at Raven Stones Brow. Since glaciers and ice sheets carved the cliff edge during the last Ice Age, weathering and frost-shattering of the rocks over thousands of years have formed the three-pronged Trinnacle outcrop. There are nearly 200 graded rock climbing routes on Ravenstones Crag.

The valley's main stream Greenfield Brook is fed by Holme Clough and Birchen Clough. Greenfield Brook flows into Greenfield Reservoir and then on into Yeoman Hey Reservoir and Dovestone Reservoir. It then flows into Chew Brook which is a tributary of the River Tame, which feeds the River Mersey.

The Ashton-under-Lyne, Stalybridge and Dukinfield (District) Waterworks Joint Committee's reservoir scheme began in the Greenfield Valley in 1870. Yeoman Hey Reservoir was completed in 1880 (capacity of 780 million litres and 20m deep). Greenfield Reservoir was built from 1897 to 1902. It is the smallest of the reservoirs (capacity of 464 million litres and 20m deep). Dovestone Reservoir is the largest of the three reservoirs in the valley. It has a capacity of 4887 million litres and is up to 31m deep. The dam is 38m high and 550m long. It was built in 1967 and the Dovestone Sailing Club was established the same year. The reservoirs are operated by United Utilities and supply water to the surrounding area including Oldham. Spruce and pine plantations are found in the lower valley and broad-leaved trees have been introduced to provide a more diverse habitat.

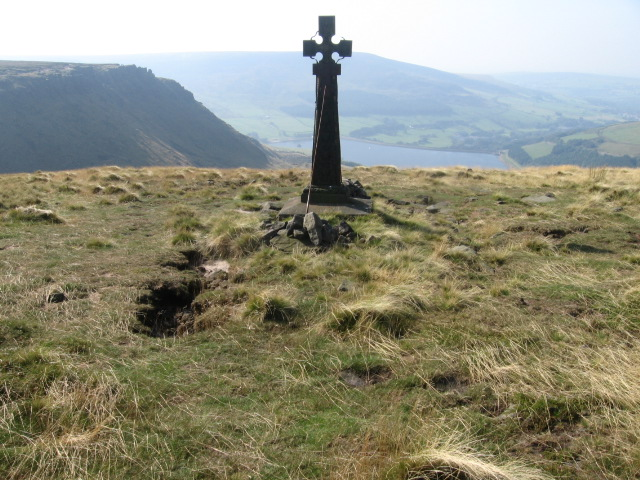
Ashway Cross

Industrialist John Platt built Ashway Gap House in 1850 on the south side of the valley. It was used as a shooting lodge until his brother James (MP for Oldham) was killed in a grouse shooting accident on the moors in 1857. Ashway Cross was erected on the moorland as a memorial to James. The vacant mansion and its estate were bought in 1897 by the waterworks board, which allowed it to be used as a Red Cross hospital for wounded soldiers during World War I. In World War II the house was used to billet Italian prisoners of war. After the house fell into decline it was demolished in 1981.

There are two World War II pillboxes (gun emplacements) on the A635 road opposite Yeoman Hey Reservoir. The pillboxes were built into a rock outcrop in c.1940 as part of defences against a possible invasion. The pair are connected by an underground passage. They are protected Grade II listed buildings.

Downstream from the reservoirs is Greenfield village in the Chew Valley.
