= Yeoman Hey Reservoir =

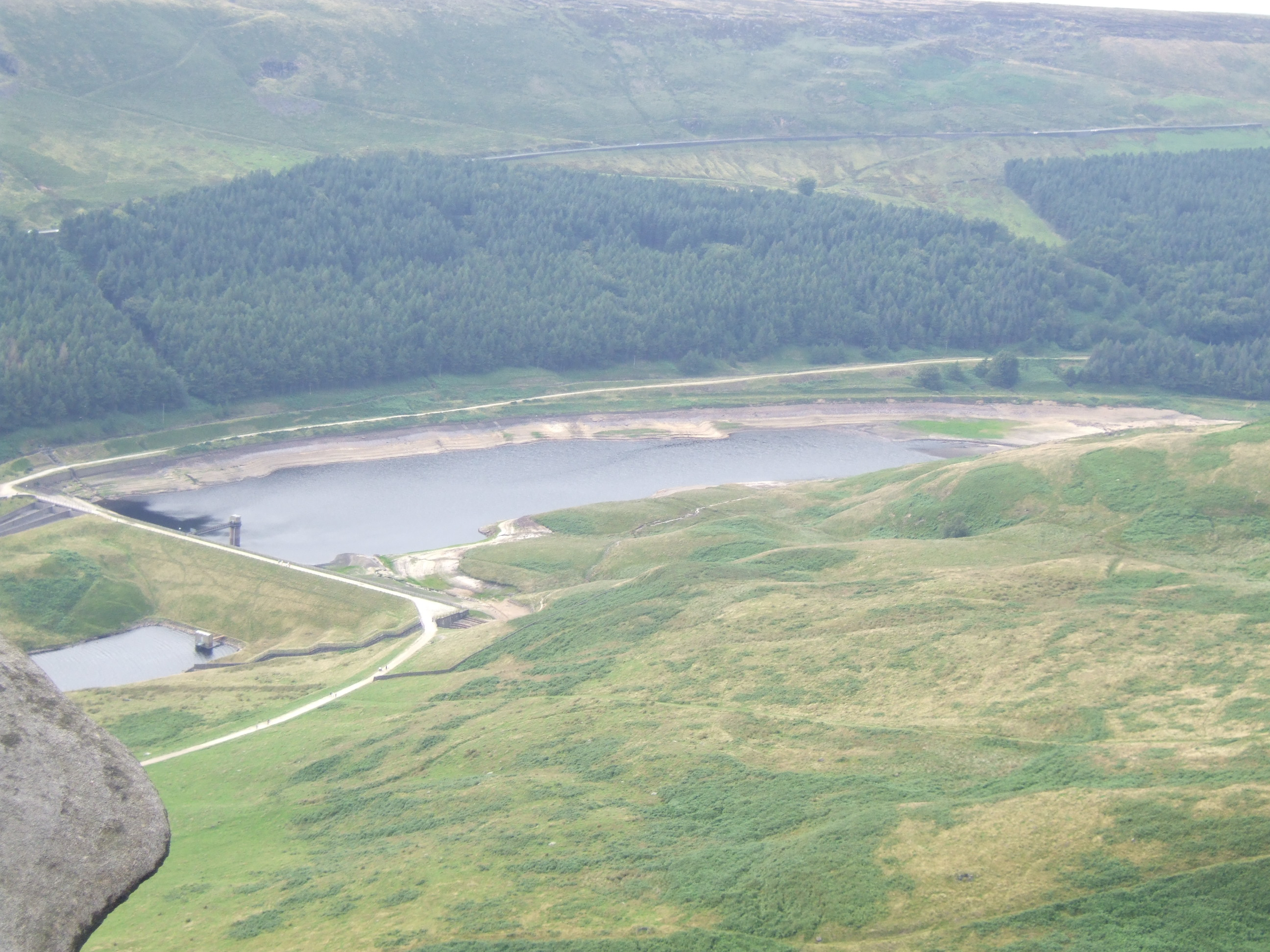

- Location within Greater Manchester Location within the United Kingdom
- Location: Greenfield; Saddleworth; Greater Manchester; England
- Coordinates: 53.5415°N 1.9680°W
- Type: reservoir
- Primary inflows: Greenfield Brook
- Primary outflows: Greenfield Brook
- Basin countries: United Kingdom
- Shore length^{1}: No
- Surface elevation: 235 m (771 ft)
- Settlements: Greenfield
- ^{1} Shore length is not a well-defined measure.

Yeoman Hey Reservoir is a reservoir in the English Peak District. On its margin is a commemorative stone laid by the King of Tonga in 1981. The reservoir is within the boundaries of Greater Manchester but was formerly in the West Riding of Yorkshire. It is one of three reservoirs in the same valley: above it is Greenfield Reservoir, and adjacent to and below it is Dovestone Reservoir. The reservoirs lie to the south of the A635 road across Saddleworth Moor. To the west, below the reservoirs, is the village of Greenfield.

The reservoir scheme in the Greenfield Valley and Chew Valley by the Ashton-under-Lyne, Stalybridge and Dukinfield (District) Waterworks Joint Committee commenced in 1870. Yeoman Hey was completed in 1880. Yeoman Hey and the valley's other reservoirs are owned by United Utilities.

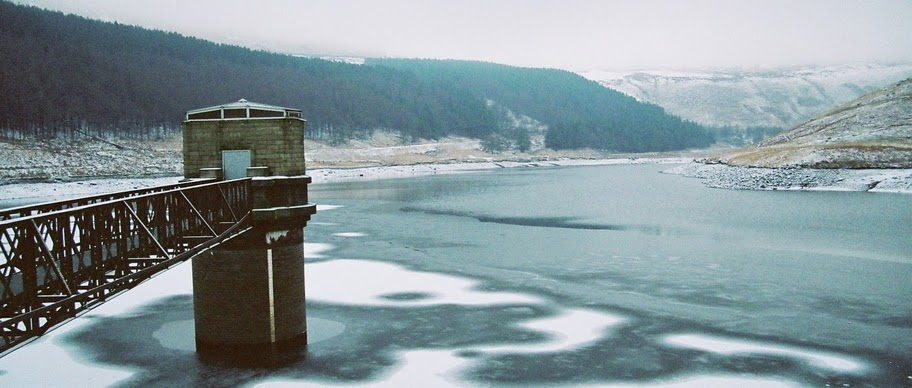
Yeoman Hey Reservoir frozen in winter
