= Geography of Greater Manchester =

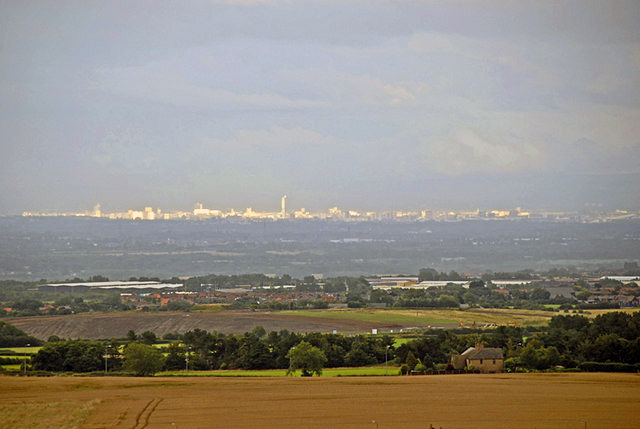
Greater Manchester from Billinge Hill

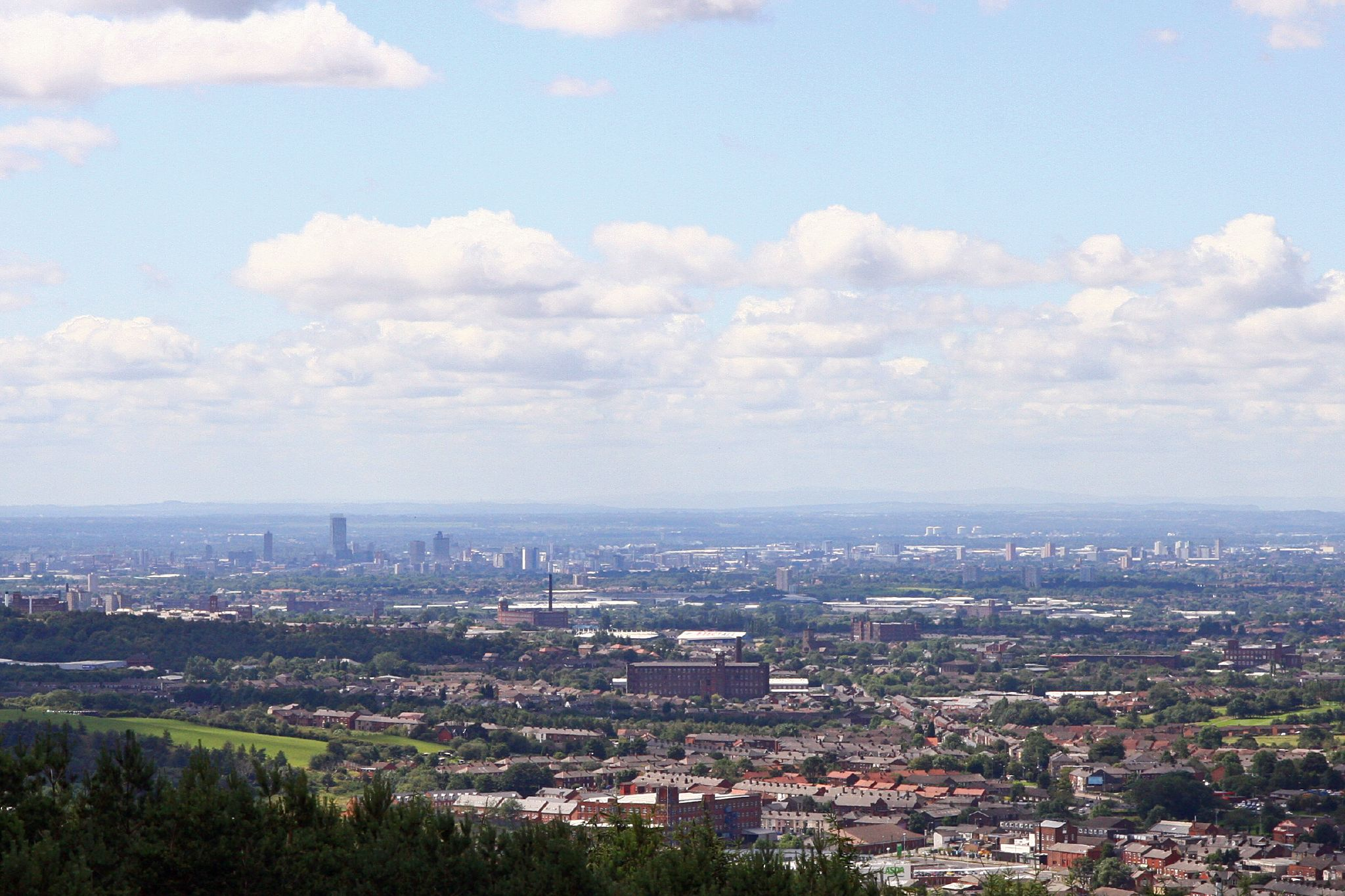
Greater Manchester is heavily urbanised and consists of vast built up areas and many settlements.

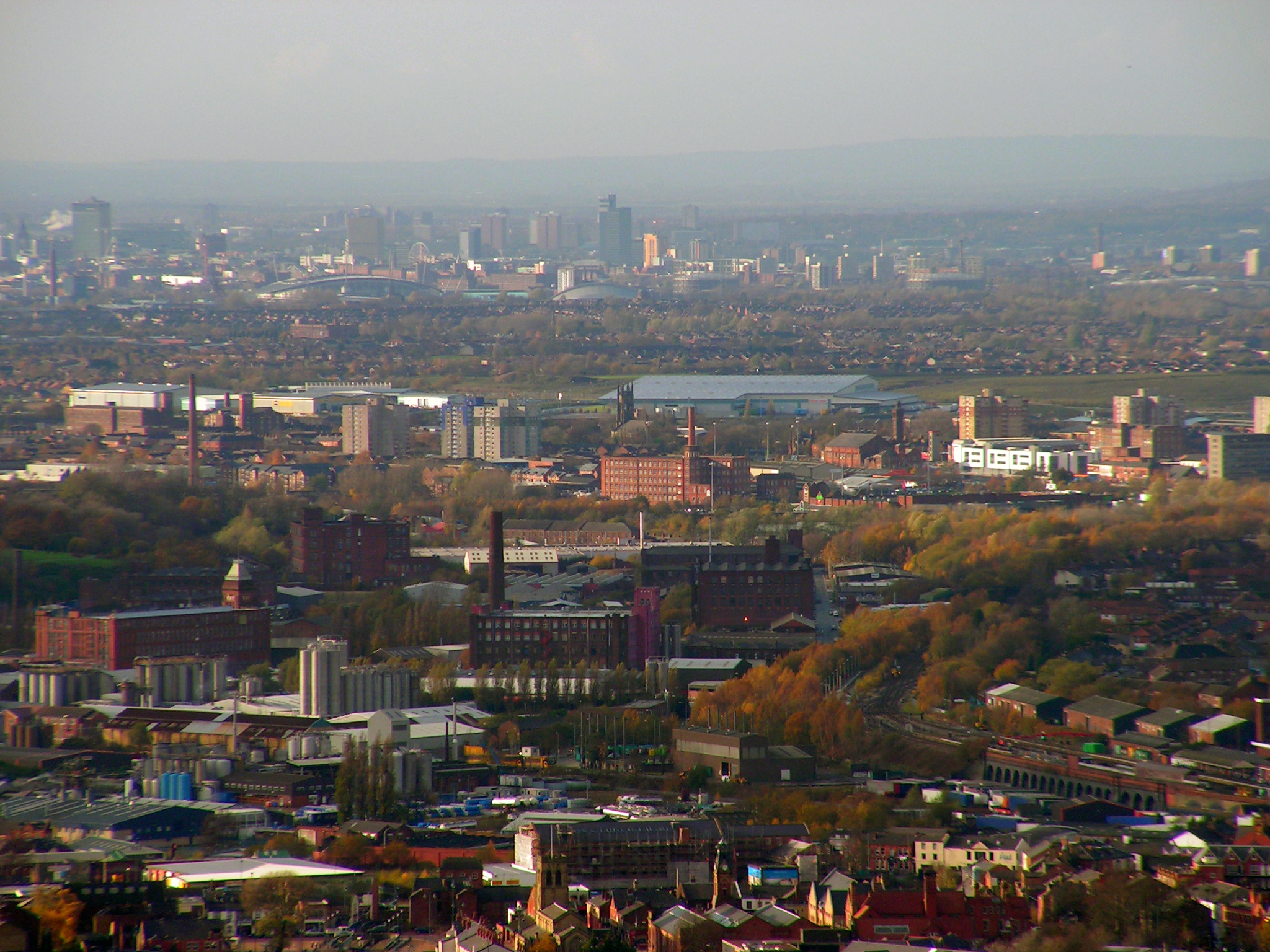
A view over the borough of Tameside, towards Manchester City Centre

The geography of Greater Manchester is dominated by one of the United Kingdom's largest metropolitan areas, and in this capacity the landlocked metropolitan county constitutes one of the most urbanised and densely populated areas of the country. There is a mix of high density urban areas, suburbs, semi-rural and rural locations in Greater Manchester, but overwhelmingly the land use in the county is urban.

Greater Manchester is a landlocked county spanning 492.7 sq mi (1,276 km^{2}) (39th largest in England). The Pennines rise along the eastern side of the county, through parts of the boroughs of Oldham, Rochdale and Tameside. The West Pennine Moors, as well as a number of coalfields (mainly sandstones and shales) lie in the west of the county. The rivers Mersey, Irwell and Tame run through the county boundaries, each of which rise in the Pennines. Other rivers run through the county, including the Beal, the Douglas, the Etherow, the Goyt, the Irk, the Medlock and the Roch. Black Chew Head is the highest point of Greater Manchester, rising 542 metres (1,778 ft) above sea-level, within the parish of Saddleworth. Chat Moss at 10.6 square miles (27 km^{2}) comprises the largest area of Grade 1 and 2 farmland in Greater Manchester and contains the largest block of semi-natural woodland in the county. Wardle is the most northerly settlement of Greater Manchester and Ramsden Clough the most northerly point; the suburb of Woodford the most southerly settlement and New Hall Farm (by the River Dean) the most southerly point.

Greater Manchester has a strong regional central business district, formed by Manchester City Centre and the adjoining parts of Salford and Trafford. However, Greater Manchester is also a polycentric county with ten metropolitan districts, each of which has a major town centre – and in some cases more than one – and many smaller settlements. Greater Manchester is arguably the most complex urban area in the United Kingdom outside London, and this is reflected in the density of its transport network and the scale of needs for investment to meet the growing and diverse movement demands generated by its development pattern.

== Settlements ==
The following table outlines the county's major settlements, formatted according to metropolitan borough.

Metropolitan county	Metropolitan district	Centre of administration	Other components
Greater Manchester	Bury	Bury	Prestwich, Radcliffe, Ramsbottom, Tottington, Whitefield
Greater Manchester	Bolton	Bolton	Blackrod, Farnworth, Horwich, Kearsley, Little Lever, South Turton, Westhoughton
Greater Manchester	Manchester	Manchester (city centre)	Blackley, Burnage, Cheetham Hill, Chorlton-cum-Hardy, Didsbury, Ringway, Withington, Wythenshawe,
Greater Manchester	Oldham	Oldham	Chadderton, Shaw and Crompton, Failsworth, Lees, Royton, Saddleworth
Greater Manchester	Rochdale	Rochdale	Heywood, Littleborough, Middleton, Milnrow, Newhey, Wardle
Greater Manchester	Salford	Swinton	Eccles, Walkden, Worsley, Salford, Irlam, Pendlebury, Cadishead
Greater Manchester	Stockport	Stockport	Bramhall, Bredbury, Cheadle, Gatley, Hazel Grove, Marple, Reddish, Romiley
Greater Manchester	Tameside	Ashton-under-Lyne	Audenshaw, Denton, Droylsden, Dukinfield, Hyde, Longdendale, Mossley, Stalybridge
Greater Manchester	Trafford	Stretford	Altrincham, Bowdon, Hale, Old Trafford, Sale, Urmston
Greater Manchester	Wigan	Wigan	Abram, Ashton-in-Makerfield, Aspull, Astley, Atherton, Bryn, Golborne, Higher End, Hindley, Ince-in-Makerfield, Leigh, Orrell, Standish, Shevington, Tyldesley, Winstanley

== Physical and extreme points ==
=== County top ===
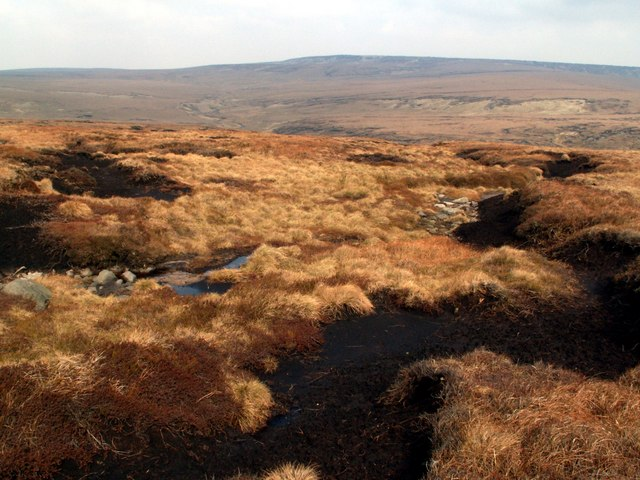
Black Chew Head is the County Top of Greater Manchester, at 542 metres (1,778 ft) above sea level.

- Highest point (County Top) – Black Chew Head (542 metres (1,778 ft) above sea level), at 53°30′57.96″N 1°55′17.76″W

=== Extremities ===
The extreme points of Greater Manchester are:

- Northernmost point – Ramsden Clough at 53°41′8.99″N 2°08′2.27″W
- Northernmost settlement – Wardle at 53°38′52.08″N 2°07′56.28″W
- Southernmost point – New Hall Farm/River Dean at 53°19′37.77″N 2°09′40.9″W
- Southernmost settlement – Woodford at 53°20′20.4″N 2°9′21.6″W
- Westernmost point – Pimbo/Sand Brook at 53°31′12.3″N 2°43′50.5″W
- Westernmost settlement – Orrell at 53°31′54.84″N 2°42′29.52″W
- Easternmost point – Holme Clough Croft (on Saddleworth Moor) at 53°32′18.47″N 1°54′36.66″W
- Easternmost settlement – Diggle at 53°34′6.6″N 1°59′42.72″W

=== Geographic midpoint ===
- Centroid/Geographic midpoint – St Matthew's Church, Crumpsall 53°31′5.76″N 2°14′2.76″W

=== Borough tops ===
The following lists and ranks the highest point of each of Greater Manchester's metropolitan boroughs:

The high points of each of Greater Manchester's metropolitan boroughs

Rank	Metropolitan borough	Height (m)	Name	Grid reference
1	Oldham	542	Black Chew Head	SE056019
2	Tameside	497	Hoarstone Edge	SE019016
3	Rochdale	474	Blackstone Edge	SD971163
4	Bolton	445	Winter Hill	SD662146
5	Bury	415	Holcombe Moor	SD755190
6	Stockport	327	Mellor Moor	SJ986872
7	Wigan	156	Billinge Hill	SD523018
8	Salford	115	Greenheys	SD713049
9	Manchester	108	Heaton Park	SD834045
10	Trafford	70	The Devisdale	SJ757869

== Geology ==
The underlying geology of Greater Manchester is dominated by rocks from three main periods from the geologic time scale—Carboniferous, Permian-and-Triassic, and Quaternary.

Most of Manchester, and its suburban fringe to the south, is located on Permian sandstones and red Triassic sandstones and mudstones, mantled by thick deposits of till and pockets of sand and gravel deposited by glaciers at the end of the last glacial period, some 15,000 years ago. The oldest rocks, from the Upper Carboniferous period, are sandstones and shales of Millstone Grit present as outcrops and uplands in the north-east of Greater Manchester, such as the upland moors of Dark Peak and South Pennines to the east and northeast of Rochdale, Oldham and Stalybridge. These rocks are overlain by shales, mudstones and thin coals of Coal Measures upon which the towns of Oldham, Rochdale, Bolton and Wigan are located. An outcrop of Coal Measures extends southwards down through Tameside and into Hazel Grove.

Starting in October 2002, a relatively large number of earthquakes were recorded in Greater Manchester, some of which were among notable tremours in the British Isles. By the end of November 2002 more than 100 earthquakes had been recorded by the British Geological Survey. The first quake, of magnitude 3.2 on the Richter Scale, struck on Monday 21 October 2002, with an epicentre about 1 mile (1.6 km) east of Manchester Piccadilly station at a depth of 3.4 kilometres (2.1 mi) A second quake of magnitude 3.9 on the Richter Scale followed four hours later and was followed by a further two substantial earthquakes on 22 October 2002. The epicentres were within a region of about 1 kilometre (0.62 mi) in diameter, about 2 kilometres (1.2 mi) northeast of the University of Manchester, leading to the rare classification of "Earthquake swarm" for the geological events. This earthquake swarm was probably caused by the movement of blocks of rocks at depth along faults that occur in the Upper Carboniferous and Triassic succession, underlying the area.

Shallow, primitive, and small-scale coal mining from the Upper Carboniferous Coal Measures in what became Greater Manchester started as early as the 13th century. The situation changed dramatically during and after the Industrial Revolution; the construction of the Bridgewater Canal and other canals in the area, enabled coal to be cheaply transported to Manchester and the River Mersey for shipment. In Oldham, relatively shallow pits were dug due to flooding problems. The writer Daniel Defoe, on a visit to Oldham, described it as a place of "... Coals ... upon the top of the highest hills" because the coal seams were so shallow and accessible. Advances in mining technology during the late-19th century lead to the formation of deeper mines. The Long Depression aside, there was a rapid acceleration of coal mining until about 1920, when the collieries in the eastern part of the Manchester Coalfield were exhausted and closed. In the western part of the coalfield, however, coal mining was continued into the 1960s. Coal mining ceased in north Manchester in the late 1970s.

== Fringe and boundary ==
The outer boundary of Greater Manchester, roughly 130 miles (209 km), "passes through or near several areas of natural beauty". To the northwest are the West Pennine Moors, and to the north and northeast the South Pennines. Parts of the Peak District National Park also cover the east and south east of Greater Manchester.

== Urban Area ==
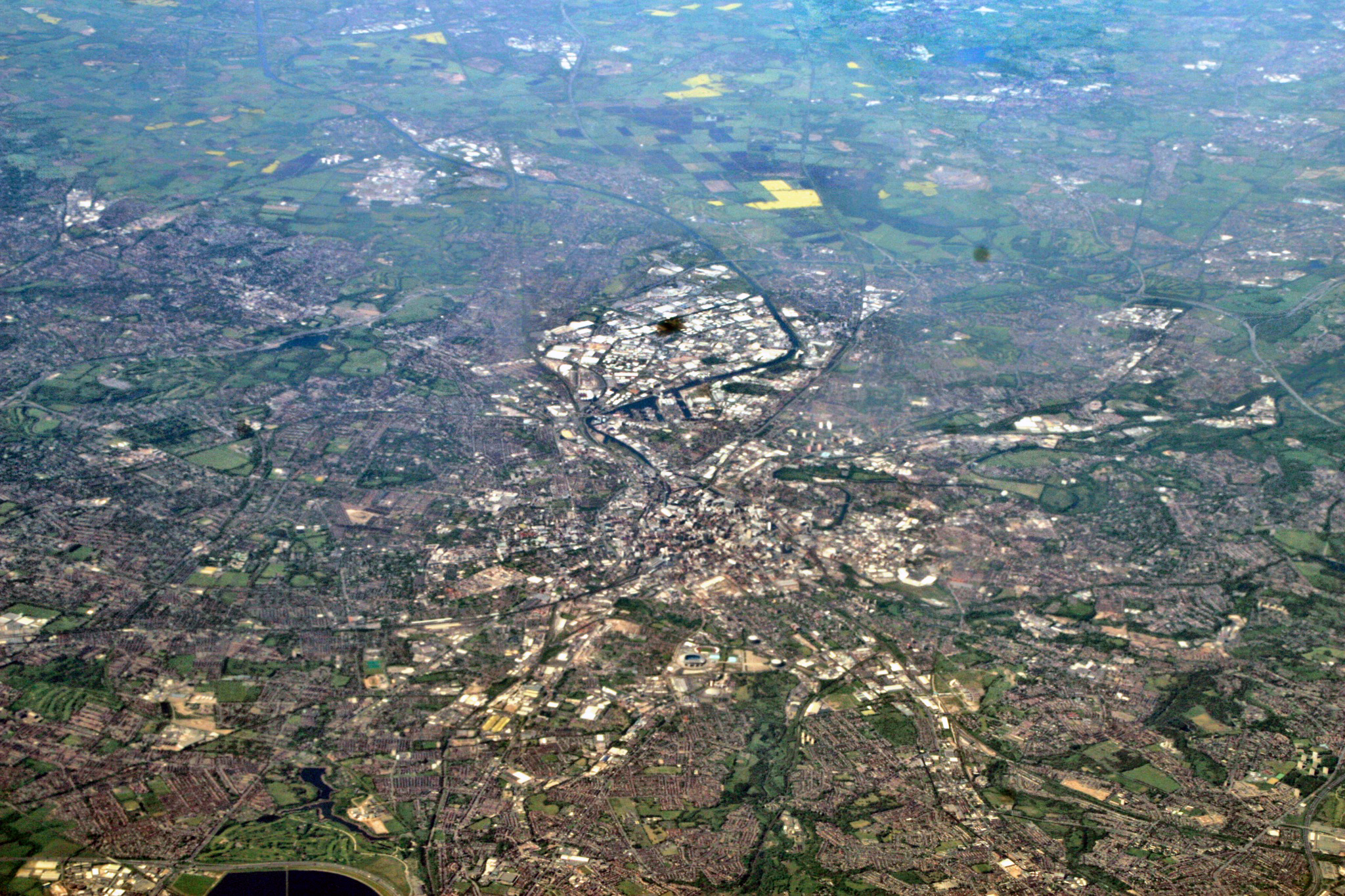
An aerial photograph, centred on Manchester and Salford

The Greater Manchester Urban Area is the larger of two main conurbations defined by the Office for National Statistics that lie within the county boundaries, the other being the Wigan Urban Area.

The Greater Manchester Urban Area is an area of land defined by the Office for National Statistics consisting of the large conurbation surrounding and including the City of Manchester. Its territory spans much, but not all of the metropolitan county of Greater Manchester. It excludes settlements such as Wigan, Westhoughton, and Marple from the Greater Manchester county boundaries (Wigan itself forming the Wigan Urban Area), but includes some settlements which are outside of the county boundaries, such as Wilmslow and Alderley Edge in Cheshire, and Whitworth in Lancashire.

== Climate ==
Greater Manchester experiences a temperate maritime climate, like most of the British Isles, with relatively cool summers and mild winters. The county's average annual rainfall is 806.6 millimetres (31.76 in) compared to the UK average of 1,125.0 millimetres (44.29 in), and its mean rain days are 140.4 per annum, compared to the UK average of 154.4. The mean temperature is slightly above average for the United Kingdom; Greater Manchester also has a fairly high humidity level (but doesn't feel as uncomfortable as London on a hot day), which lent itself to the optimised and breakage-free textile manufacturing which took place around the county. Snowfall is not a common sight in the built up areas, due to the urban warming effect. However, the Pennine and Rossendale Forest hills around the eastern and northern edges of the county receive more snow, and roads leading out of the county can be closed due to heavy snowfall, notably the A62 road via Standedge, the A57 (Snake Pass) towards Sheffield, and the M62 over Saddleworth Moor.

Climate data for Manchester (MAN), 69 m (226 ft) amsl, 1981–2010 normals, extremes 1958–present
Month	Jan	Feb	Mar	Apr	May	Jun	Jul	Aug	Sep	Oct	Nov	Dec	Year
Record high °C (°F)	14.3 (57.7)	19.0 (66.2)	21.7 (71.1)	25.1 (77.2)	26.7 (80.1)	31.3 (88.3)	38.0 (100.4)	33.7 (92.7)	28.4 (83.1)	27.0 (80.6)	17.7 (63.9)	15.1 (59.2)	38.0 (100.4)
Mean daily maximum °C (°F)	7.3 (45.1)	7.6 (45.7)	10.0 (50.0)	12.6 (54.7)	16.1 (61.0)	18.6 (65.5)	20.6 (69.1)	20.3 (68.5)	17.6 (63.7)	13.9 (57.0)	10.0 (50.0)	7.4 (45.3)	13.5 (56.3)
Daily mean °C (°F)	4.5 (40.1)	4.6 (40.3)	6.7 (44.1)	8.8 (47.8)	11.9 (53.4)	14.6 (58.3)	16.6 (61.9)	16.4 (61.5)	14.0 (57.2)	10.7 (51.3)	7.1 (44.8)	4.6 (40.3)	10.0 (50.0)
Mean daily minimum °C (°F)	1.7 (35.1)	1.6 (34.9)	3.3 (37.9)	4.9 (40.8)	7.7 (45.9)	10.5 (50.9)	12.6 (54.7)	12.4 (54.3)	10.3 (50.5)	7.4 (45.3)	4.2 (39.6)	1.8 (35.2)	6.6 (43.9)
Record low °C (°F)	−17.6 (0.3)	−13.1 (8.4)	−9.7 (14.5)	−4.9 (23.2)	−1.7 (28.9)	0.8 (33.4)	5.4 (41.7)	3.6 (38.5)	0.0 (32.0)	−4.7 (23.5)	−10.0 (14.0)	−14.0 (6.8)	−17.6 (0.3)
Average precipitation mm (inches)	72.3 (2.85)	51.4 (2.02)	61.2 (2.41)	54.0 (2.13)	56.8 (2.24)	66.1 (2.60)	63.9 (2.52)	77.0 (3.03)	71.5 (2.81)	92.5 (3.64)	81.5 (3.21)	80.7 (3.18)	828.8 (32.63)
Average precipitation days (≥ 1.0 mm)	13.1	9.7	12.3	11.2	10.4	11.1	10.9	12.0	11.1	13.6	14.1	13.5	142.9
Average snowy days	6	5	3	2	0	0	0	0	0	0	1	3	20
Average relative humidity (%)	83	81	77	74	72	74	76	77	79	81	83	84	79
Average dew point °C (°F)	2 (36)	2 (36)	3 (37)	4 (39)	7 (45)	9 (48)	11 (52)	12 (54)	10 (50)	8 (46)	5 (41)	3 (37)	6 (43)
Mean monthly sunshine hours	52.5	73.9	99.0	146.9	188.3	172.5	179.7	166.3	131.2	99.3	59.5	47.1	1,416.2
Mean daily sunshine hours	3.4	3.4	5.2	6.8	6.7	6.4	6.6	6.0	5.9	3.8	3.5	3.6	5.1
Average ultraviolet index	0	1	2	4	5	6	6	5	4	2	1	0	3
Source 1: Met Office NOAA (relative humidity and snow days 1961–1990)
Source 2: KNMI Current Results - Weather and Science Meteo Climat Time and Date: Average dew point (1985–2015) WeatherAtlas

== Flora and fauna ==
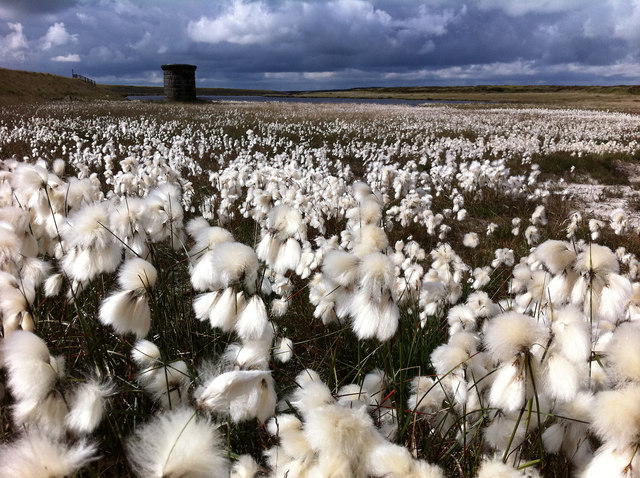
Common cottongrass (Eriophorum angustifolium), seen here at Light Hazzles Reservoir near Littleborough, was voted the county flower of Greater Manchester in 2002.

Contrary to its reputation as an urban sprawl, Greater Manchester has green belt, constraining urban drift, and a "wide and varied range" of wildlife and natural habitat. For instance, the wooded valleys of Bolton, Bury and Stockport, the moorlands north and east of Rochdale, Oldham and Stalybridge, and the reed beds between Wigan and Leigh, harbour flora and fauna of national importance. Mature woodland, scrubland, grassland, high moorland, mossland, agricultural land, lakes, wetlands, river valleys, embankments, urban parks and suburban gardens are habitats found in Greater Manchester which further contribute to biodiversity. The Greater Manchester Ecology Unit classifies Sites of Biological Importance. The 21 Sites of Special Scientific Interest (SSSI) in Greater Manchester, and the 12.1 square miles (31 km^{2}) of common land in Greater Manchester are of particular interest to organisations such as the Greater Manchester Local Record Centre, the Greater Manchester Biodiversity Project and the Manchester Field Club, which are dedicated to wildlife conservation and the preservation of the region's natural history. Among the SSSIs are Astley and Bedford Mosses which form a network of ancient peat bog on the fringe of Chat Moss, which in turn, at 10.6 square miles (27 km^{2}) comprises the largest area of prime farmland in Greater Manchester and contains the largest block of semi-natural woodland in the county. The Wigan Flashes, such as those at Pennington Flash Country Park, are the by-product of coal mining, where subsidence has led to waterbodies collecting in the resulting hollows which form an important reed bed resource in Greater Manchester. Opened in 1979, Sale Water Park is a 152-acre (62 ha) area of countryside and parkland in Sale which includes a 52-acre (21 ha) artificial lake by the River Mersey.

Clover, sorrel, nettle and thistle are common, and grow wild in Greater Manchester. Common heather (Calluna vulgaris) dominates the uplands, such as Saddleworth Moor, which lies within the South Pennines and Dark Peak area of the Peak District National Park. The Rochdale Canal harbours Floating Water-plantain (Luronium), an endangered aquatic plant. In 2002, Plantlife International launched its County Flowers campaign, asking members of the public to nominate and vote for a wild flower emblem for their county. Common cottongrass (Eriophorum angustifolium), a plant with fluffy white plumes native to wet hollows on high moors, was announced as the county flower of Greater Manchester.

The grey squirrel was the most common wild mammal seen in Greater Manchester in 2012, and were reported in four out of five gardens; hedgehogs were seen in nearly half of all gardens surveyed; bats were seen in a third of all gardens surveyed. The house sparrow, common starling, and common blackbird are among the most populous bird species in Greater Manchester; almost a third of Greater Manchester's gardens had baby blackbirds in June 2012. Eurasian magpie and feral pigeon are common and breed in habitats across the county. The South Pennines support internationally important numbers of European golden plover, curlew, merlin and twite.
