= Strychnine poisoning =

- Strychnine
- Specialty: Emergency medicine
- Complications: Lactic acidosis, Hyperthermia, Rhabdomyolysis
- Usual onset: 10–20 minutes after exposure
- Causes: Exposure to strychnine
- Diagnostic method: 1–30 mg/L strychnine in blood
- Medication: Anticonvulsants

Strychnine poisoning is poisoning induced by strychnine. It can be fatal to humans and other animals and can occur by inhalation, swallowing or absorption through eyes or mouth. It produces some of the most dramatic and painful symptoms of any known toxic reaction, making it quite noticeable and a common choice for assassinations and poison attacks. For this reason, strychnine poisoning is often portrayed in literature and film, such as the murder mysteries written by Agatha Christie.

The probable lethal oral dose in humans is 1.5 to 2 mg/kg. Similarly, the median lethal dose for dogs, cats, and rats ranges from 0.5 to 2.35 mg/kg.

== Presentation in humans ==
Ten to twenty minutes after exposure, the body's muscles begin to spasm, starting with the head and neck in the form of trismus and risus sardonicus. The spasms then spread to every muscle in the body, with nearly continuous convulsions, and get worse at the slightest stimulus. The convulsions progress, increasing in intensity and frequency until the backbone arches continually. Convulsions lead to lactic acidosis, hyperthermia and rhabdomyolysis. These are followed by postictal depression. Death comes from asphyxiation caused by paralysis of the neural pathways that control breathing, or by exhaustion from the convulsions. The subject usually dies within two to three hours after exposure.

One medical student in 1896 described the experience in a letter to The Lancet:

Three years ago I was reading for an examination, and feeling "run down". I took 10 minims of strychnia solution (B.P.) with the same quantity of dilute phosphoric acid well diluted twice a day. On the second day of taking it, towards the evening, I felt a tightness in the "facial muscles" and a peculiar metallic taste in the mouth. There was great uneasiness and restlessness, and I felt a desire to walk about and do something rather than sit still and read. I lay on the bed and the calf muscles began to stiffen and jerk. My toes drew up under my feet, and as I moved or turned my head flashes of light kept darting across my eyes. I then knew something serious was developing, so I crawled off the bed and scrambled to a case in my room and got out (fortunately) the bromide of potassium and the chloral. I had no confidence or courage to weigh them, so I guessed the quantity—about 30 gr. [30 grains, about 2 grams] bromide of potassium and 10 gr. chloral—put them in a tumbler with some water, and drank it off. My whole body was in a cold sweat, with anginous attacks in the precordial region, and a feeling of "going off." I did not call for medical aid, as I thought that the symptoms were declining. I felt better, but my lower limbs were as cold as ice, and the calf muscles kept tense and were jerking. There was no opisthotonos, only a slight stiffness at the back of the neck. Half an hour later, as I could judge, I took the same quantity of bromide, potassium and chloral—and a little time after I lost consciousness and fell into a "profound sleep," awaking in the morning with no unpleasant symptoms, no headache, &c., but a desire "to be on the move" and a slight feeling of stiffness in the jaw. These worked off during the day.

== Treatment ==
There is no antidote for strychnine poisoning. Strychnine poisoning demands aggressive management with early control of muscle spasms, intubation for loss of airway control, toxin removal (decontamination), intravenous hydration and potentially active cooling efforts in the context of hyperthermia as well as hemodialysis in kidney failure (strychnine has not been shown to be removed by hemodialysis). Treatment involves oral administration of activated charcoal, which adsorbs strychnine within the digestive tract; unabsorbed strychnine is removed from the stomach by gastric lavage, along with tannic acid or potassium permanganate solutions to oxidize strychnine.

=== Activated charcoal ===
Activated charcoal is a substance that can bind to certain toxins in the digestive tract and prevent their absorption into the bloodstream. The effectiveness of this treatment, as well as how long it is effective after ingestion, are subject to debate. According to one source, activated charcoal is only effective within one hour of poison being ingested, although the source does not regard strychnine specifically. Other sources specific to strychnine state that activated charcoal may be used after one hour of ingestion, depending on dose and type of strychnine-containing product. Therefore, other treatment options are generally favoured over activated charcoal.

The use of activated charcoal is considered dangerous in patients with tenuous airways or altered mental states.

=== Other treatments ===
Most other treatment options focus on controlling the convulsions that arise from strychnine poisoning. These treatments involve keeping the patient in a quiet and darkened room, anticonvulsants such as phenobarbital or diazepam, muscle relaxants such as dantrolene, barbiturates and propofol, and chloroform or heavy doses of chloral, bromide, urethane or amyl nitrite. If a poisoned person is able to survive for 6 to 12 hours subsequent to initial dose, they have a good prognosis.

The sine qua non of strychnine toxicity is the "awake" seizure, in which tonic-clonic activity occurs but the patient is alert and oriented throughout and afterwards. Accordingly, George Harley (1829–1896) showed in 1850 that curare (wourali) was effective for the treatment of tetanus and strychnine poisoning.

== Detection in biological specimens ==
Strychnine is easily quantitated in body fluids and tissues using instrumental methods in order to confirm a diagnosis of poisoning in hospitalized victims or to assist in the forensic investigation of a case of fatal overdosage. The concentrations in blood or urine of those with symptoms are often in the 1–30 mg/L range.

== Strychnine toxicity in animals ==
Strychnine poisoning in animals occurs usually from ingestion of baits designed for use against rodents (especially gophers and moles) and coyotes. Rodent baits are commonly available over-the-counter, but coyote baits are illegal in the United States. However, since 1990 in the United States most baits containing strychnine have been replaced with zinc phosphide baits. The most common domestic animal to be affected is the dog, either through accidental ingestion or intentional poisoning. The onset of symptoms is 10 to 120 minutes after ingestion. Symptoms include seizures, a "sawhorse" stance, and opisthotonus (rigid extension of all four limbs). Death is usually secondary to respiratory paralysis. Treatment is by detoxification using activated charcoal, pentobarbital for the symptoms, and artificial respiration for apnea.

In most western nations a special license is needed to use and possess strychnine for agricultural use.

== Notable instances ==
The most notable incidents which probably involved strychnine poisoning, are listed here.

- Alexander the Great may have been poisoned by strychnine in contaminated wine in 323 BC.
- Christiana Edmunds, the "Chocolate Cream Poisoner", laced chocolates with strychnine. She poisoned a number of people and murdered a four-year-old boy in Brighton in the 1870s.
- Emeline Meaker murdered her husband's eight-year-old half-sister Alice by lacing her drink with strychnine. As Alice convulsed from the effects of the poison, Meaker held her hand over Alice's mouth to muffle her cries until the girl was dead. Emeline Meaker was executed for Alice's murder in 1883.
- Margot Begemann, a friend of Vincent van Gogh, attempted suicide by ingesting strychnine in 1884.
- In the late 19th century, serial killer Thomas Neill Cream used strychnine to murder several prostitutes on the streets of London.
- Walter Horsford was hanged in 1898 for murdering his cousin with strychnine, to whom he had sent it on the pretense it was an otherwise harmless abortifacient. He was implicated in two other murders which also involved mailing it to women who suspected they were pregnant by him.
- Belle Gunness of La Porte, Indiana, also known as "Lady Bluebeard", allegedly used strychnine to murder some of her victims at the turn of the 20th century.
- Jane Stanford, co-founder of Stanford University and wife of California governor Leland Stanford, died from strychnine poisoning in 1905. Her last recorded words were "My jaws are stiff. This is a horrible death to die." Her murderer was never identified.
- Early 20th-century Portuguese poet and novelist Mário de Sá-Carneiro committed suicide via strychnine poisoning in 1916 aged 25.
- French inventor Jean-Pierre Vaquier poisoned Alfred Jones, the husband of his lover Mabel Jones, by putting strychnine in his hangover cure in Byfleet, Surrey, in 1924. Vaquier was hanged for the crime.
- Hubert Chevis, a lieutenant in the British Army, died in suspicious circumstances after eating partridge laced with strychnine at Blackdown Camp, Surrey, in 1931. The poisoner was never identified.
- Yoshio Nishimura, a prominent Japanese expatriate and president of the Japanese Association, died of strychnine poisoning shortly after arriving at police headquarters in Singapore for questioning by Special Branch in 1934. The coroner rendered an open verdict. The incident was speculated to be connected to espionage.
- In 1938, blues musician Robert Johnson died after drinking a bottle of whiskey which was allegedly laced with strychnine. This account of Johnson's death is disputed, as he died several days after the alleged poisoning.
- Oskar Dirlewanger, the commander of the SS-Sonderkommando Dirlewanger, was known to have tortured several Jewish women by stripping them naked and having them injected with strychnine. Dirlewanger and a few Wehrmacht logistic officers then watched them convulse until death.
- Irene Bates, mother of possible Zodiac Killer victim Cheri Jo Bates, died of strychnine poisoning in July 1969. She had been living in the city of Riverside, California.
- Turgut Özal, the 8th president of the Republic of Turkey, died in 1993 while in office and is theorized to have been assassinated via strychnine poisoning. In 2012, Özal's body was exhumed for testing, but the results were inconclusive.
- In 2008, Hannes Hirtzberger, the Mayor of Spitz in Lower Austria, was reported to have been poisoned by local wine producer Helmut Osberger using strychnine. Hirtzberger barely survived and suffered permanent disability.
- The body of David Lytton was found on Saddleworth Moor, northwest England, in December 2015 after he consumed a lethal dose of strychnine. His identity remained a mystery until January 2017.

== In culture ==
Strychnine has also served as an inspiration in several books, movies and TV series.

=== In literature ===
- In William S. Burroughs novel Naked Lunch, strychnine is described as a "hot shot", a poisonous shot of heroin sold to informants.
- In Anne of Green Gables Miss Cuthbert is warned against adopting an orphan girl with a story about a girl who poisoned her entire adopted family by putting strychnine in the well.
- In Agatha Christie's novel The Mysterious Affair at Styles, Mrs. Emily Inglethorp was killed by strychnine poisoning.
- In Agatha Christie's short story The Coming of Mr Quin, Mr Appleton died of strychnine poisoning.
- In Agatha Christie's story How Does Your Garden Grow?, Miss Amelia Barrowby was killed by strychnine poisoning.
- The Joker makes a cameo appearance in the DC Comics Elseworld graphic novel Gotham by Gaslight as a serial killer who tries to kill himself with strychnine; the poison causes muscle contractions that leave him with a permanent grin. Additionally, a derivative of strychnine is cited as a key ingredient in the Joker's deadly toxic gas in the main continuity.
- In the James Herriott novels All Creatures Great and Small (1972) and All Things Wise and Wonderful (1977), the main character/local veterinarian deals with several victims of strychnine poisoning when a dog-killer attacks the neighborhood dogs.
- In "The Fox Hunter" chapter of William Le Queux's Secrets of the Foreign Office, a strychnine derivative is suspected in the murder of Beatrice Graham and the attempted murder of the protagonist Duckworth Drew. The poison was applied to pins concealed in Graham's fur shawl and Drew's hotel towel.
- In Gabriel García Márquez's novel One Hundred Years of Solitude, Colonel Aureliano Buendía survived strychnine poisoning.
- In Peter Robinson's novel Cold Is the Grave, Chief Constable Riddle's daughter, Emily, is accidentally killed by cocaine laced with a lethal dose of strychnine.
- In Hans Scherfig's novel Stolen Spring, a high school student kills his teacher with a strychnine-tainted malt drop.
- In the manga Spiral: Suiri no Kizuna (by Kyou Shirodaira and illustrated by Eita Mizuno), main character Ayumu Narumi takes strychnine after he is threatened by Rio Takeuchi to test his luck in a game.
- In The Sign of the Four by Sir Arthur Conan Doyle, where Bartholomew Sholto is killed by a poison dart. Dr. Watson confirms it was strychnine poisoning, causing tetanus, thus the devilish grin on the dead Sholto's face.
- In The Invisible Man by H. G. Wells, the Invisible Man relates that he took strychnine as a sleeping aid. "Strychnine," he says, "is a grand tonic...to take the flabbiness out of a man."
- In The Count of Monte Cristo by Alexandre Dumas, the Saint-Mérans and the servant Barrois are consecutively poisoned to death having ingested beverages containing strychnine. The death of Barrois is depicted with symptoms of acute convulsions, asphyxia, severe pain, ringing in the ears and visual glares that are precipitated by touch.
- In The Anubis Gates the protagonist combats strychnine poisoning by eating ash and cinder of a fireplace, remembering that carbon neutralizes strychnine from stomach.
- In Stephen King's novel Mr. Mercedes, Brady Hartsfield plans to poison a dog using hamburger laced with strychnine-based gopher poison. His mother finds and eats the hamburger herself, and Brady comes home to find her suffering agonizing convulsions. When she dies, her mouth is twisted into a grin.
- In Jack London's short story "The Story of Jees Uck", Neil Bonner is poisoned by eating biscuits laced with strychnine by Amos Pentley. Neil survives and sends Amos into the frozen wilderness to his death.
- In Jack London's short story "Just Meat", partners-in-crime Matt and Jim successfully steal $500,000 of diamonds and pearls from an unscrupulous jewel merchant. Overcome by greed, both characters want to eliminate the other and unknowingly poison each other with strychnine.
- In Jack London's short story "Moon-Face", the narrator develops a deep and obsessive hate for his neighbor, who is always cheerful even under the most dire situations. He poisons the neighbor's dog with strychnine in an effort to make him even the least bit unhappy. The neighbor, despite the death of his dog, continues to be unreasonably merry and joyful, forcing the protagonist to create a devious plan.

=== In film ===
- A Blueprint for Murder (1953) is about how a stepmother is stopped after beginning to kill her family members for insurance money.
- In Psycho (1960), Norman Bates' mother and her lover were killed with strychnine. The sheriff comments: "Ugly way to die." The original book by Robert Bloch provides additional details about the strychnine murders.
- In Cape Fear (1962), Max Cady poisons Sam Bowden's dog with strychnine.
- In The Wild Geese (1978), Roger Moore's character Shawn Flynn poisoned the son of a crime lord by making him eat the drugs he had him transport having laced them with strychnine.
- In Shubho Mahurat (2003), Padmini Chowdhury, commits a series of murders by variously administering strychnine on the victims. Upon being exposed by Ranga Pishima, Padmini commits suicide using strychnine.
- In the film Red Dog (2011), the red kelpie was believed to be poisoned deliberately in 1979 by strychnine.
- In The Grand Budapest Hotel (2014), Madame Desgoffe-und-Taxis is found dead by strychnine poisoning. Later, a bottle labeled "strychnine" is seen on the desk of an assassin in her son Dmitri's employ.
- In Detective Byomkesh Bakshy! (2015), council member Gajanand Sikdaar is killed by adding strychnine to his breakfast just before he can reveal the murderer's name to the protagonist, Bakshy

=== In television ===
- The murder in the Monk episode "Mr. Monk and the Secret Santa" is carried out by poisoning a bottle of port with strychnine.
- Inmates in The Wire were given cocaine and heroin doses laced with strychnine.
- In season 9 of The Office, Dwight Schrute tells Angela Martin that his aunt had poisoned her nurse with strychnine.
- In the Game of Thrones episode "The Lion and the Rose", Joffrey Baratheon is killed after being poisoned during his wedding reception. The symptoms resemble those of strychnine poisoning.
- In the tenth episode of The Haunting of Hill House, Luke Crain nearly dies after injecting himself with strychnine while under the spell of a malevolent ghost.
- In the eighth season of Wentworth, inmate Sheila Bausch is given one final choice by fellow inmate Lou Kelly – ingest a vial of strychnine, or have her throat slit. Bausch opts for the former. Bausch is subsequently euthanised by Marie Winter to end the pain caused by the poisoning.

=== In music ===
- In his song "I'm Gonna Kill You", Hank Green sings about wanting to put someone on a strychnine diet.
- In "The End of All Things To Come", Mudvayne sings about killing the entire world with strychnine.
- The Sonics' song "Strychnine" (later covered by The Cramps and The Fuzztones) is about the consumption of strychnine.
- In "Composing" from Boys Night Out's concept album Trainwreck, The Patient poisons his entire family at the dinner table with strychnine.
- In "The Bomb Song", Darwin Deez sings about people being sick from strychnine in the water.
- In "Coyote, My Little Brother," American folksinger Peter La Farge sings how the environment has been "strychnined" to kill off coyote populations.
- In The Mountain Goats song "An Antidote for Strychnine" the narrator sings about trying to find an antidote to being poisoned by strychnine.
