= Greenfield Reservoir =

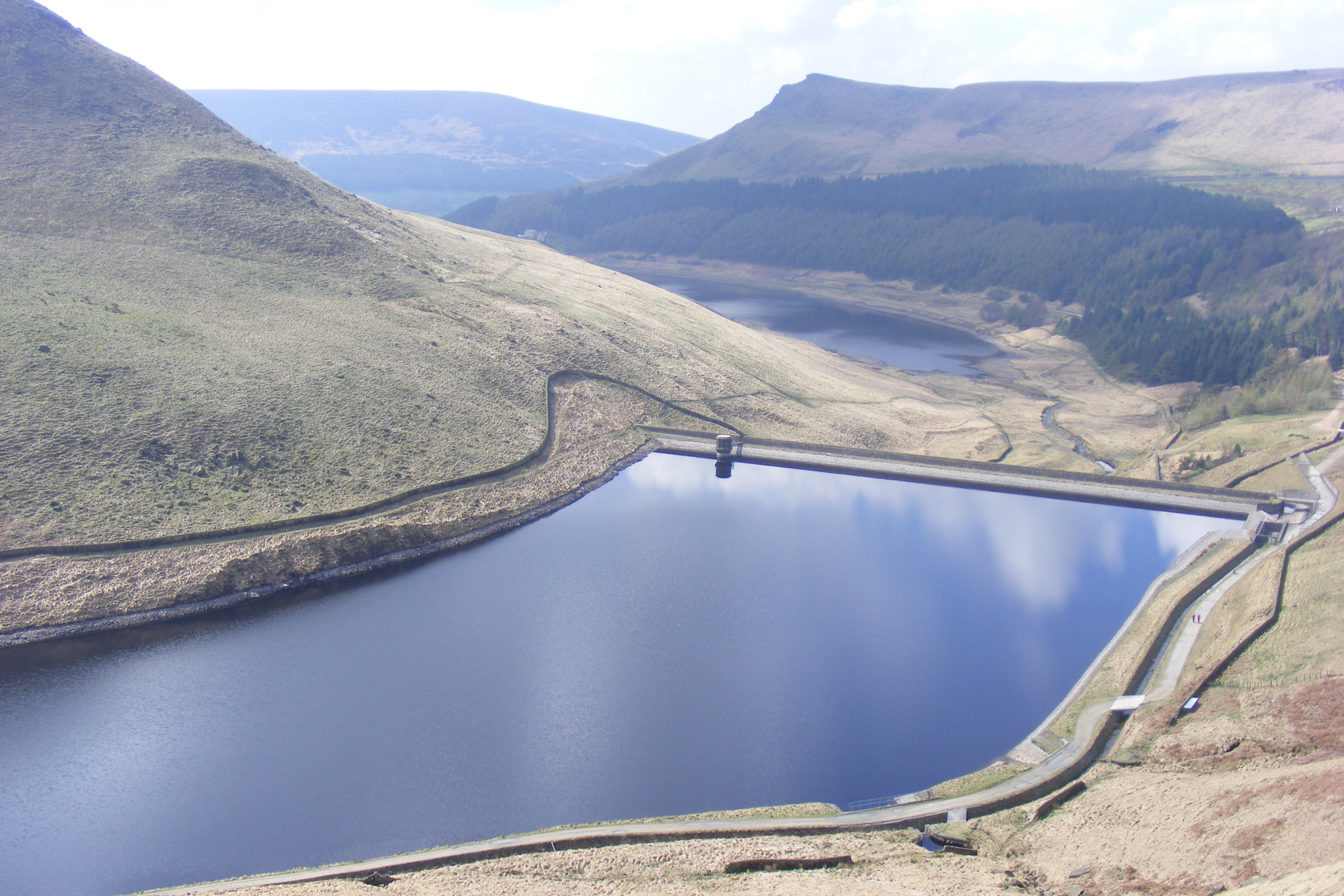

- Location within Greater Manchester
- Location: Greenfield; Saddleworth; Greater Manchester; England
- Coordinates: 53.5450°N 1.9577°W
- Type: reservoir
- Primary inflows: Greenfield Brook
- Primary outflows: Greenfield Brook
- Basin countries: United Kingdom
- Settlements: Greenfield

Greenfield Reservoir is a reservoir in the Saddleworth parish of the Metropolitan Borough of Oldham in Greater Manchester, in the English Peak District. Lying within the historic boundaries of the West Riding of Yorkshire, above the village of Greenfield, it is on the edge of the Peak District National Park, near the A635 road on Saddleworth Moor. The reservoir is fed by the Greenfield Brook and is above the Yeoman Hey Reservoir, which in turn feeds into Dovestone Reservoir.

The Ashton-under-Lyne, Stalybridge and Dukinfield (District) Waterworks Joint Committee's reservoir scheme in the Greenfield Valley commenced in 1870. Greenfield and the valley's other reservoirs are owned by United Utilities.

Greenfield Reservoir was built between 1897 and 1902 and is shallow, with a maximum depth of 20 metres. It has a capacity of 464 million litres and sits at an altitude of 271 meters. The shoreline is 0.922 kilometres and it is the smallest of four reservoirs located in the area. The area is popular with walkers, with footpaths along Yeoman Hey linking the reservoir with Dovestone Reservoir.

The Dovestone area is subject to a public protection order and is also popular with bird watchers, with the RSPB working with United Utilities to look after the areas habitats, which include peregrine falcons, curlews and golden plovers.
