= 1949 Manchester BEA Douglas DC-3 accident =

1949 commercial airline disaster in England

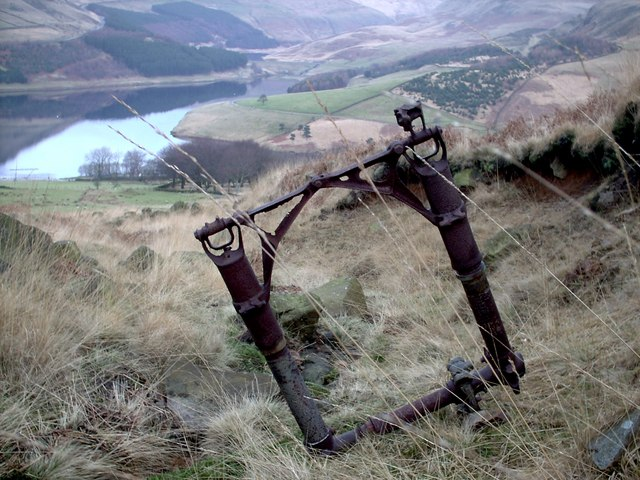
- Wreckage of the DC3's undercarriage above Dovestone Reservoir

Accident
- Date: 19 August 1949
- Summary: Controlled flight into terrain caused by navigational and pilot errors.
- Site: Saddleworth Moor, West Riding of Yorkshire, England

Aircraft
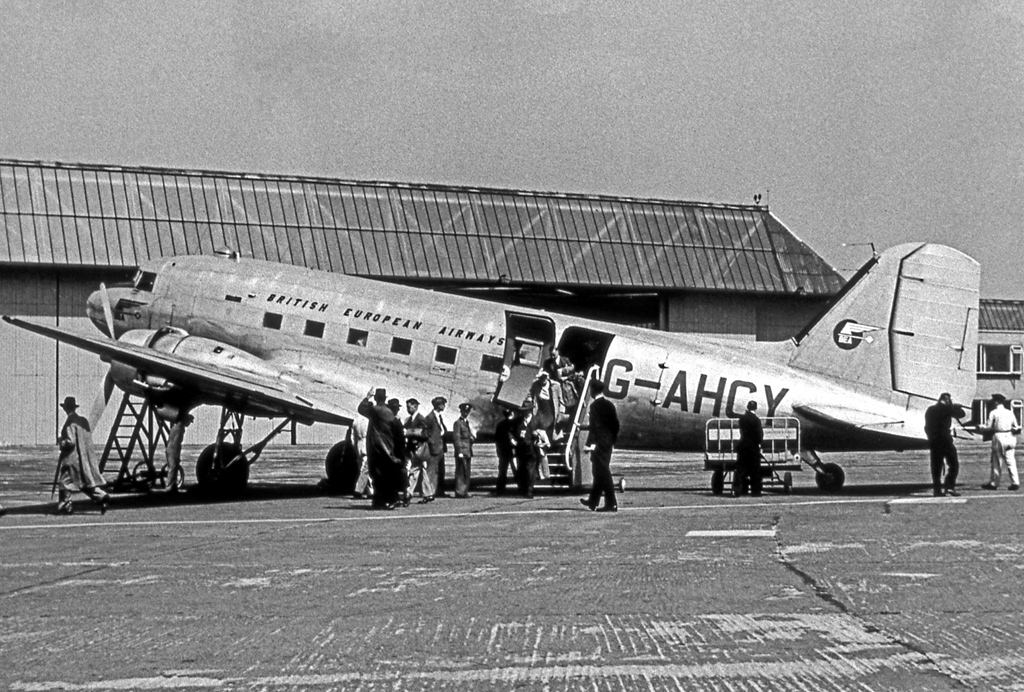
- G-AHCY, the aircraft involved in the accident
- Aircraft type: Douglas DC-3
- Operator: British European Airways
- Registration: G-AHCY
- Flight origin: Nutts Corner Airport, Belfast, Northern Ireland
- Destination: Manchester Airport, England
- Passengers: 29
- Crew: 3
- Fatalities: 24
- Injuries: 8
- Survivors: 8

The 1949 Manchester BEA Douglas DC-3 accident occurred when a twin-engined British European Airways Douglas DC-3 (registration: G-AHCY) crashed on Saddleworth Moor in the Pennines near Oldham, Lancashire, after a flight from Belfast. The accident killed 24 of the passengers and crew on board. The aircraft had first flown in 1944, and was captained by F. W. Pinkerton, a former RAF serviceman who, as a sergeant, had been posted missing during World War II. The airline was government-owned.

== Accident ==
The aircraft took off from Belfast Nutts Corner Airport at 10:58 on 19 August 1949 on a short-haul flight to Manchester Airport, with twenty-nine passengers and either three or four crew members on board. US newspaper reports, using agency reports filed soon after the incident, favour the former number of crew; Flight Magazine, reporting a little time later, favoured the latter.

An hour after take-off, at 11:59, the last radio contact with the crew occurred and about one minute later the aircraft crashed. It was flying at approximately 1,350 feet (410 m) when it hit a mist-covered hill (53°31.240′N 1°58.733′W) at Wimberry Stones, near to the Chew Valley on Saddleworth Moor near Oldham, 15 miles (24 km) from Manchester Airport. Contact was made approximately 20 feet (6 m) from the summit. The aircraft broke up and caught fire. Twenty-one passengers and all the crew members died, leaving eight survivors.

The dead passengers were eleven women, six men and four children, three of whom were aged under two years; the three crew members were all male. All but two of the dead died at the scene. The injured were treated at Oldham Infirmary. The rescue was hampered by bad weather and the remote location of the crash site. Workers from a paper mill approximately 0.75 miles (1.2 km) away formed a human chain to carry the injured from the hillside to lower ground and a doctor at the scene said, "I found bodies scattered all over the place. There were a few survivors lying groaning on the hillside but some of them died before I could attend to them. I have been a doctor since 1914 and served in both wars, but this was the worst sight that I have ever seen." The cause of the accident was an error in navigation, incorrect approach procedure and failure to check the position of the aircraft accurately before the descent from a safe height.

An hour later, a Proctor light aircraft crashed on a test flight in mist at Baildon in Yorkshire, approximately 40 miles (64 km) away. All four of its passengers died.

The five-year-old Stephen Evans was one of the survivors. His parents also survived, but his younger brother Roger was killed. Evans, now an eminent professor of epidemiology, returned to the site of the crash for the first time in 2016 along with members of his family.
