= Greenfield, Greater Manchester =

Village in Greater Manchester, England

Coordinates: 53.536°N 2.008°W

Greenfield
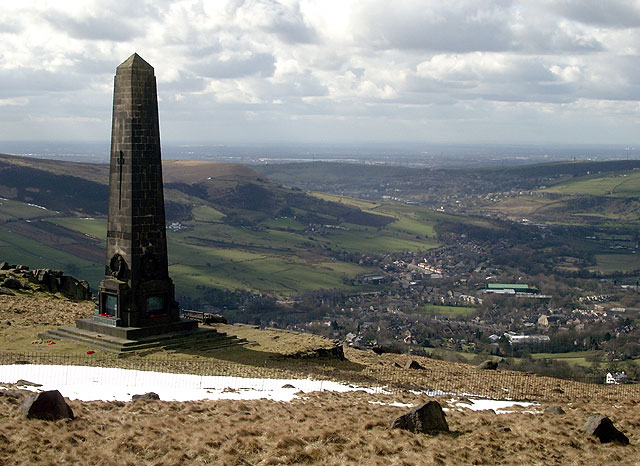
- The Obelisk on Alderman's Hill (Pots and Pans) overlooking Greenfield towards Oldham

- Location within Greater Manchester
- Population: 1,831 (2011 Census)
- OS grid reference: SD995061
- Civil parish: Saddleworth
- Metropolitan borough: Oldham
- Metropolitan county: Greater Manchester
- Region: North West
- Country: England
- Sovereign state: United Kingdom
- Post town: OLDHAM
- Postcode district: OL3
- Dialling code: 01457
- Police: Greater Manchester
- Fire: Greater Manchester
- Ambulance: North West
- UK Parliament: Oldham East and Saddleworth

Greenfield is a village in the civil parish of Saddleworth in the Metropolitan Borough of Oldham, in Greater Manchester, England. It is 4 miles (6.4 km) east of Oldham and 13 miles (21 km) north-east of Manchester. It is located in a broad rural area at the southern edge of the South Pennines; Dovestone Reservoir, Chew Reservoir and Greenfield Reservoir lie to the east of the village in the Peak District National Park.

Historically part of the West Riding of Yorkshire, Greenfield is sited in the Chew Valley, on the main A635 road from Ashton-under-Lyne to Holmfirth.

== History ==
A Roman road passes along the Saddleworth hills, from the fort of Ardotalia in Glossop to Castleshaw Roman fort. The route of the Roman road passes through Greenfield and crosses Chew Brook at Packhorse Bridge.

The old stone houses of Saddleworth date from the 17th century and were home to farmers and hand loom weavers in the woollen trade. Greenfield woollen mill was built in 1780. The railway station opened in 1849. The mill later became a paper mill in 1921, providing employment for people in the area, ceasing production in 2001. The first industrial looms were also designed and built in Saddleworth.

England's highest church 'The Heights' and canal tunnel 'Standedge Tunnel' are also here, the latter dating from the end of the 18th century and being a Thomas Telford project.

In 1849 the Boarshurst Silver Band was formed as the village band. This brass band is still in existence.

The poem Jone o Grinfilt was written about a fictional inhabitant of the village with the aim of ridiculing countryside dwellers. The poem was written in the Oldham dialect of English, and was very popular in the 19th century. The author was probably Joseph Lees of Glodwick and it was written in the first decade of the 19th century.

One of world's first rock climbers' sit harness (later known as the Troll Mark 2) was invented in Greenfield in the 1970s.

== Governance ==
Greenfield was located in the historic county of the West Riding of Yorkshire and, prior to 1974, was administered by the West Riding County Council. Their administration led to problems; for example, the village was dependent on a fire service based in Holmfirth, despite it being located significantly further away than Oldham. This was particularly problematic in the winter months, as the roads into the village often become blocked or dangerous due to snow and ice, coupled with the village's exposed position on the Pennine moorland.

In 1974, governance was transferred to the newly created Greater Manchester County Council. When that body was abolished in 1986, Greenfield moved under the auspices of Oldham Borough Council.

== Geography ==
Greenfield is at the western end of the Chew Valley in the south west edge of the South Pennines and is fringed by the Peak District to the east. The village contains four reservoirs, three of which are linked to one another: Greenfield, Yeoman Hey and Dovestones in Greenfield Valley. The fourth is Chew Reservoir at the head of Chew Valley, which is the highest man-made reservoir in England. There is a yachting club on Dovestone Reservoir, the largest of these, and a set of walking paths round the first three. A steep walking path also connects Dovestones to Chew Reservoir. Much of the area covered by the reservoirs lies within the boundary of the Peak District National Park.

Saddleworth Moor rises above Greenfield and leads over impressively barren and disorientating moorlands to Holmfirth, some 10 miles eastwards. The area includes some of the sites used by Ian Brady and Myra Hindley, known as the 'Moors murders', to bury their child victims in the early to mid 1960s. The sinister nature of the crimes was the subject of a song by the Smiths in 1984.

Greenfield is also the home of an amateur rugby league side, Saddleworth Rangers, as well as Greenfield Cricket Club and Saddleworth Cricket Club. There are two junior and infant schools, and three churches (one Methodist and two Anglican).

== Landmarks ==
Pots and Pans is a locally well-known hill overlooking the village. It is the site of the Saddleworth war memorial (a Grade II listed building), constructed in 1923. Approximately 1,200 feet (370 m) above sea level, it is visible from seven of the ten villages that comprise Saddleworth. A service is held there on Remembrance Sunday each year.

== Transport ==
=== Railway ===
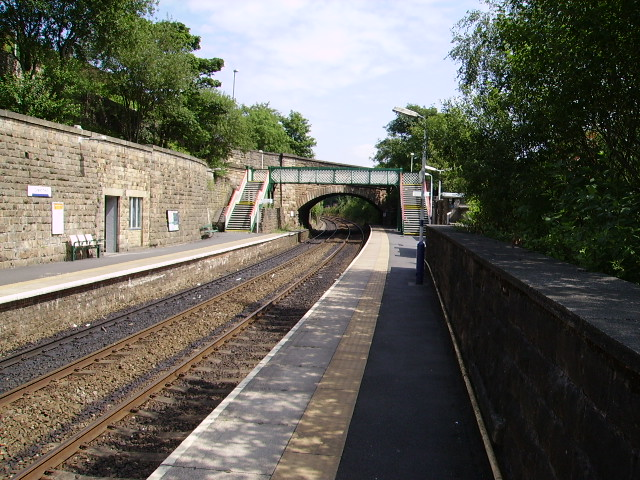
Greenfield station

Greenfield railway station lies along the Huddersfield Line. Services operated by TransPennine Express run eastbound towards Huddersfield, via Marsden and Slaithwaite, and westbound towards Manchester Piccadilly, via Mossley, Stalybridge and Ashton-under-Lyne. Some peak-time and evening services provide direct connections to Leeds, York, Saltburn and Hull.

Since the Oldham Loop was closed and converted to a Metrolink tram line, Greenfield is the only place in Saddleworth and the whole Metropolitan Borough of Oldham which has a National Rail station. Grotton and Springhead, Delph and Grasscroft stations closed in 1955, whilst Diggle and Saddleworth stations closed in 1968.

A second line, known as the Micklehurst Line, cut through the village and was mainly used for freight. This closed in 1966 and the viaducts were removed in the mid 1970s; the former route is now occupied, in the main, by a bridleway.

=== Buses ===
Bus services in Greenfield are operated predominantly by Stagecoach Manchester as part of the Bee Network. Services operate to Manchester Piccadilly via Oldham, Huddersfield via Diggle, Greenfield and Oldham, and Oldham and Ashton-under-Lyne. South Pennine Community Transport operate a limited service on Saturdays between Uppermill and Holmfirth.

== Culture ==
Greenfield is one of the towns and villages which holds an annual Whit Friday brass band contest and the annual Road End Fair is held every Maundy Thursday in the centre of the village.

== Notable residents ==
- Hervey Rhodes, Baron Rhodes (Lord Lieutenant of Lancashire from 1968 to 1971 and Deputy-Lord Lieutenant of Greater Manchester in 1974) was from Greenfield.

== See also ==
- Listed buildings in Saddleworth
