= Stephen Evans (pharmacoepidemiologist) =

British epidemiologist and medical statistician

Stephen James Weston Evans MBE (born c.1943) is a British pharmacoepidemiologist and medical statistician, and as of 2020 a professor of pharmacoepidemiology at the London School of Hygiene & Tropical Medicine (LSHTM).

Evans earned a bachelor's degree in physics and chemistry, and a master's in medical statistics from LSHTM. He worked in statistics and computing at the London Hospital Medical College for 25 years, leaving there in 1995 as Professor of Medical Statistics. He was president of the International Society for Pharmacoepidemiology for 2010/2011, and a member of the statistics expert group for the Infected Blood Inquiry. In the 2024 New Year Honours, Evans was appointed Member of the Order of the British Empire (MBE) for services to the safety of medicines.

Evans survived the 1949 Manchester BEA Douglas DC-3 accident when he was five years old.
