= Chew Valley, Greater Manchester =

Valley in Greater Manchester, England

Chew Valley Reservoir
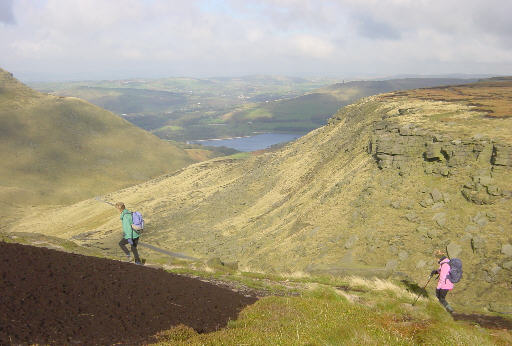

- Location within Greater Manchester
- Location: Greater Manchester
- Coordinates: 53°31′N 1°57′W
- Type: Reservoir
- Primary inflows: Chew Clough, Green Grain, Dry Clough, South Clough
- Primary outflows: Chew Brook
- Basin countries: United Kingdom

Chew Valley in Saddleworth, Greater Manchester, England, follows the course of Chew Brook on the western slopes of Black Chew Head to where it joins the River Tame at Greenfield, east of Manchester. Part of the higher fringes of the valley towards the peak of Black Chew Head lie across the boundary in Derbyshire. The eastern part of the valley including the reservoirs of Dovestone and Chew are within the north western extremity of the Peak District National Park.

Chew Reservoir was completed in 1912. At 1,600 feet (490 m) above sea level, it was the highest reservoir constructed in England. A tram-road was laid in Chew Valley to transport 42,318 cubic yards (32,354 m^{3}) of clay to make an inner core for its dam to make it watertight. The tram and railway are gone but the route forms the Oldham Way long-distance footpath; reconstructed bridge hosts a sign with information, pictures, and a map.

In 1949, a BEA Douglas DC3 crashed into the hill at Wimberry Rocks killing 24 passengers and crew and leaving 8 survivors.

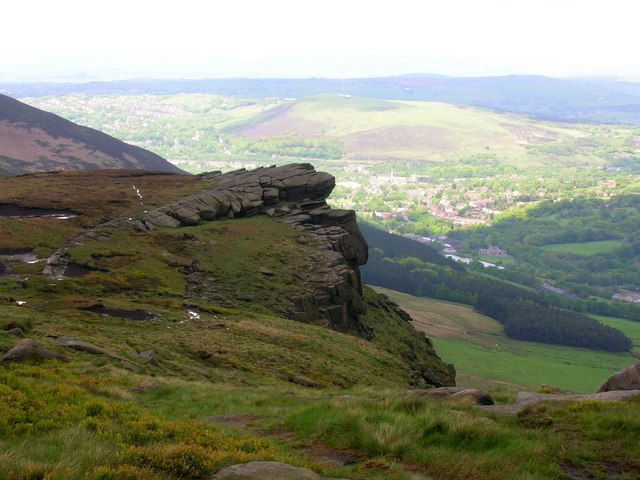
Wimberry Rocks in the Chew Valley

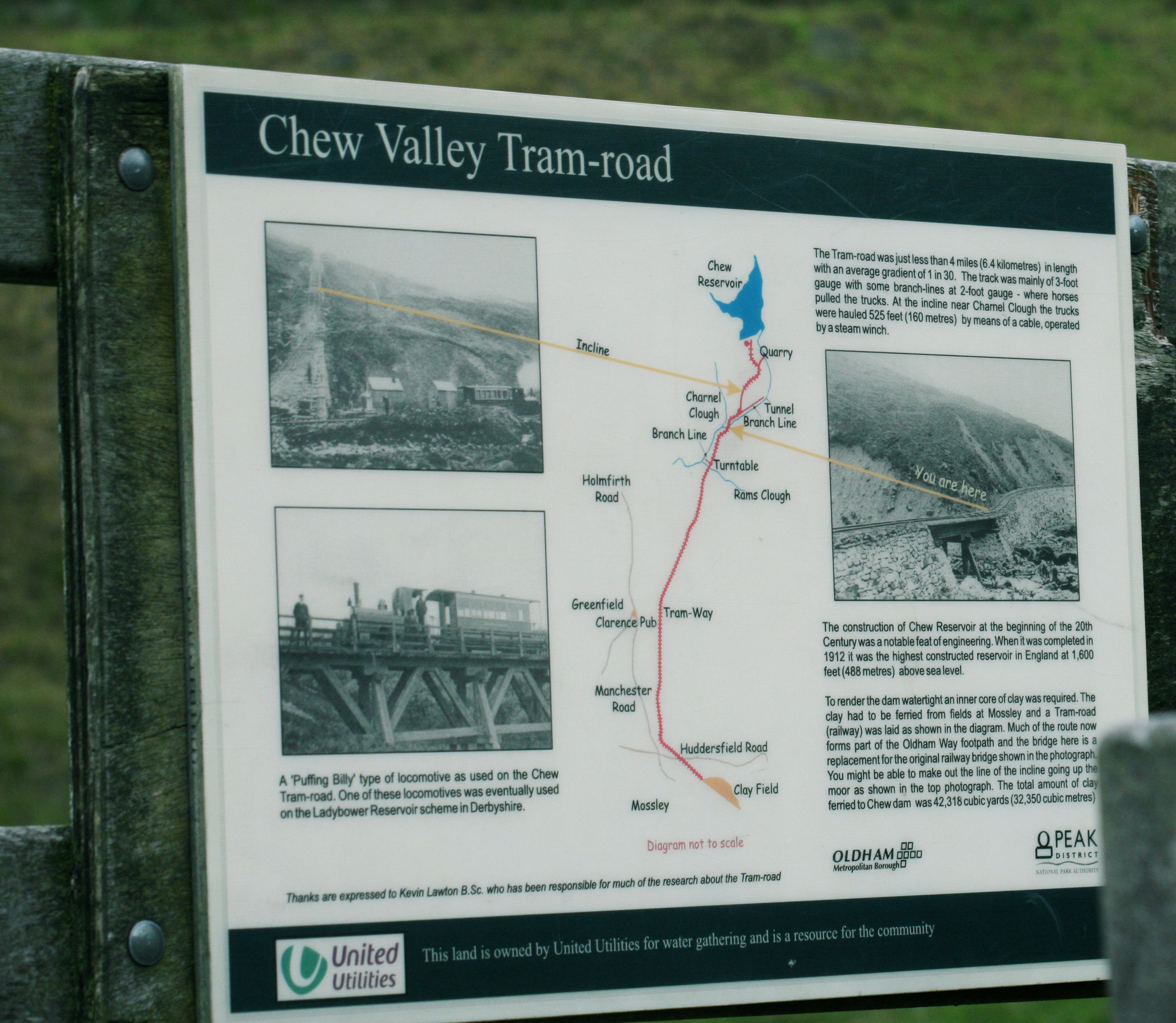
Sign showing ownership of the valley by United Utilities and old maps of the tram that once ran through the valley

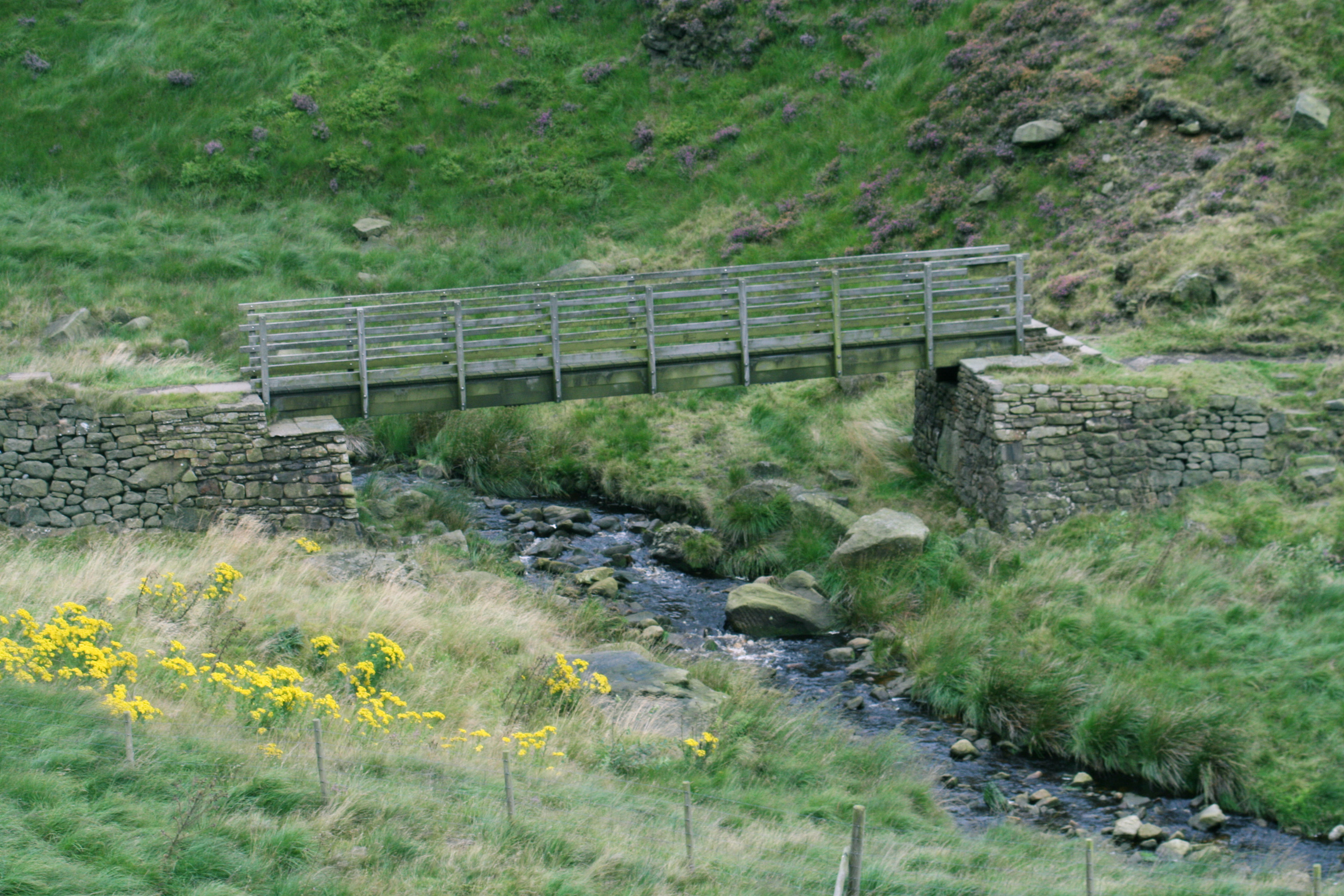
Oldham Way footpath, Chew Valley

== Chew Brook ==
The Chew Brook begins as a small stream on the western slopes of Black Chew Head [53°30′46″N 1°55′02″W], part of Saddleworth Moor and the highest point of Greater Manchester. Travelling westward down the slope, it is joined by several other streams including the Black Chew Grain. After running for approximately 1 km through marshy moorland, the brook empties into the Chew Reservoir [53°30′49″N 1°56′55″W], built in 1912 and the highest constructed reservoir in England at the time (1,600 feet/490 m above sea level; Cow Green Reservoir, near Middleton in Teesdale in County Durham, is the current holder, completed in 1971). Excerpts from a labourer's description of working on the dam at Chew Valley are available in the book Navvyman by Dick Sullivan.

At the western end of the reservoir the brook emerges down a narrow and steep ravine, curving steadily to the northwest for 2.3 kilometres (1.4 mi) before this time emptying into Dovestone Reservoir [53°31′34″N 1°58′27″W]. Exiting the western end of Dovestone, the brook – now a small river – meanders through the heart of Greenfield village. Chew Brook ends its journey a short distance below Greenfield railway station where it flows into the River Tame [53°32′06″N 2°00′43″W].

== Tributaries ==
- Greenfield Brook (R)
  - Dove Stone Brook (L)
  - Near Deep Brook (R)
  - Far Deep Brook(R)
  - Craggy Brook (R)
  - Near Rough Brook (R)
  - Far Rough Brook (R)
  - Near Warmsey Brook (R)
  - Holme Brook (Rs)
    - Rimmon Pit Brook (R)
      - Little Brook (R)
      - Great Gruff (R)
      - Little Holme Brook (L)
  - Birchen Brook (Ls)
    - Little Birchen Brook (L)
    - Howels Head Brook (R)
      - North Grain (R)
- Charnel Brook (R)
- Dish Stones Brook (R)
- Bower Brook (L)
- Green Grain (L)
- Black Chew Grain (R)
- Bird Grain (R)
