= Saddleworth Moor =

Moorland in northwest England

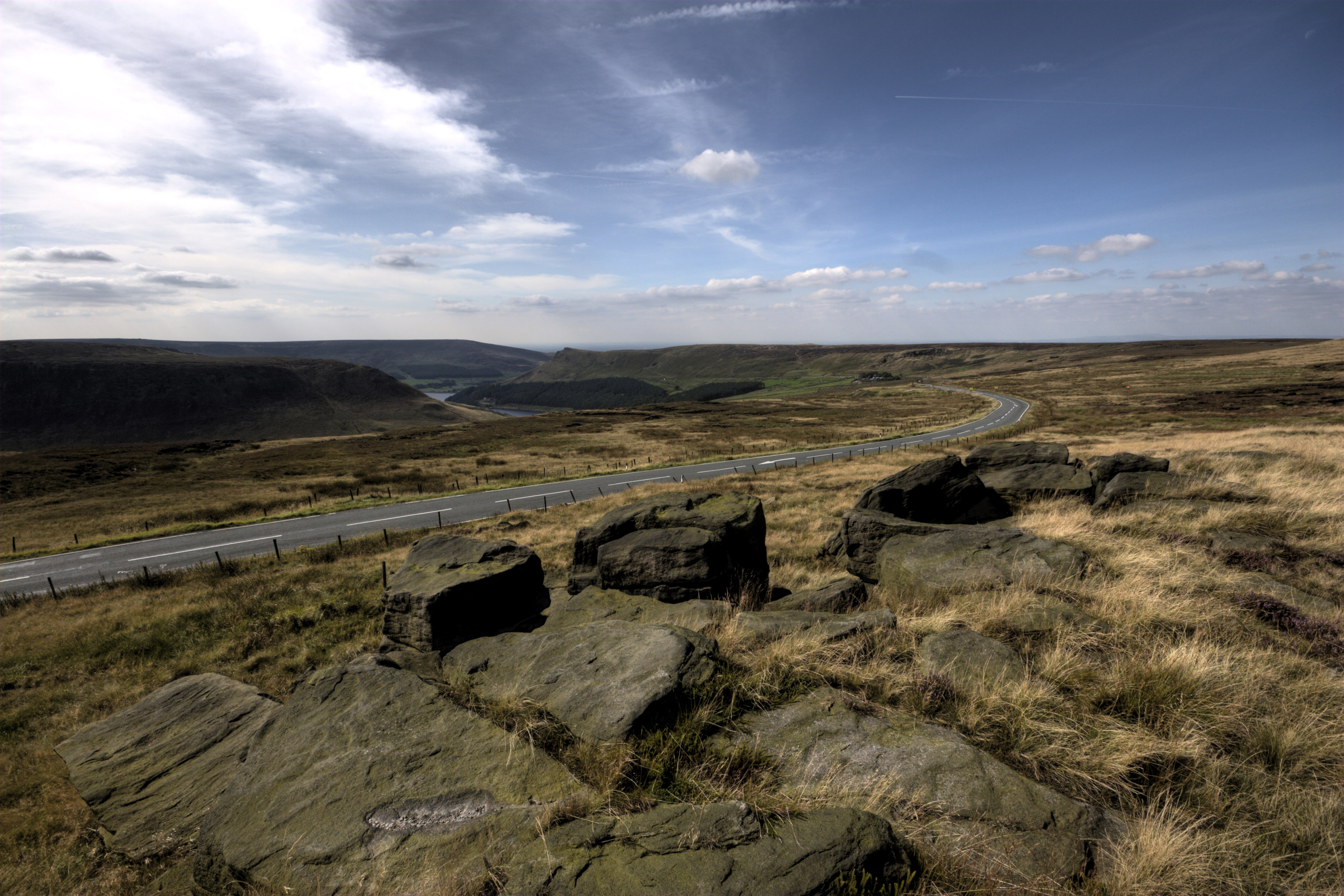
- Saddleworth Moor towards Dovestone Reservoir

Highest point
- Coordinates: 53°32′36″N 1°57′21″W

Geography
- Location within Greater Manchester
- Location: Northern England
- Parent range: Peak District

Geology
- Mountain type: Moorland

Climbing
- Easiest route: Pennine Way

Saddleworth Moor is a moorland in North West England. Reaching more than 1,312 feet (400 m) above sea level, it is in the Dark Peak area of the Peak District National Park. It is crossed by the A635 road and the Pennine Way passes to its eastern side.

== Geography ==
The moor takes its name from the parish of Saddleworth to the west, historically in the West Riding of Yorkshire, although it is on the western side of the Pennines and so has been administrated by Oldham and part of Greater Manchester since 1974. The moor, an elevated plateau with gritstone escarpments or edges and, around its margins, deeply incised v-shaped valleys or cloughs (Note: Clough is derived from the Old English cloh which means a deep valley or ravine.) with fast-flowing streams, straddles the metropolitan boroughs of Oldham in Greater Manchester and Kirklees in West Yorkshire. Moorland east of the county boundary with West Yorkshire is known as Wessenden Moor and Wessenden Head Moor. The moor is crossed by the A635 between the Greater Manchester and West Yorkshire Urban Areas. The A635 is known locally as the Isle of Skye road, taking the name from a former public house at Wessenden Head, Upperthong that was demolished after a fire. The Pennine Way arrives from the Wessenden Valley to the north and crosses the moor on its ascent to Black Hill on Holme Moss to the south. The high moorland is sparsely inhabited. Scattered farmsteads, built of gritstone, and fields demarcated by dry stone walls are on the lower land and in the valleys where there is some coniferous woodland. The overlying peat is cut by drainage channels or groughs. Much of the area is open access land.

=== Vegetation ===
Blanket bog covers much of the moor. Cottongrass is the most dominant feature but sphagnum mosses are scarce. Heather, crowberry, bilberry and the rare cloudberry are also found. The peat formation is 9,000 years old but extensive areas contain bare peat from which the surface has eroded.

=== Reservoirs ===
Dovestone, Yeoman Hey, Greenfield and Chew Reservoirs east of Oldham, are accessed from the A635 road. They supply water to the surrounding area. The valley is surrounded by rocky outcrops and moorland. Spruce and pine plantations are found in the valley and broad-leaved trees have been introduced to provide a more diverse habitat.

Yeoman Hey was built in 1880 and Chew Reservoir in 1914, and when built, was the highest reservoir in the British Isles at 1,601 feet (488 m) above sea level. The bed of a tramway, built to aid its construction, remains visible. The area around the reservoir is used for recreation.

== Events ==
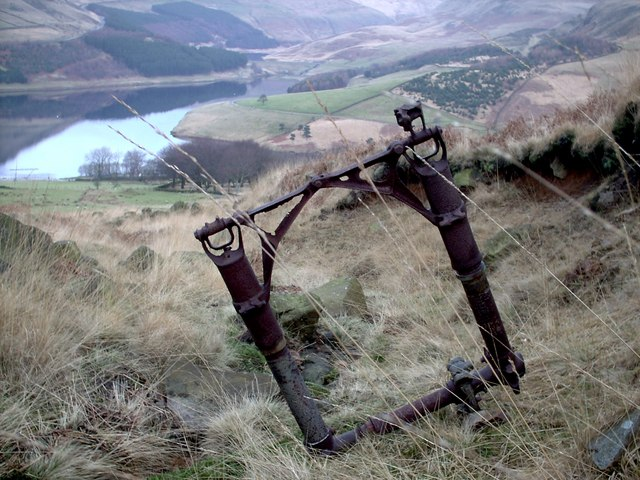
Wreckage of the BEA Douglas DC3 undercarriage, 2003 (Dovestone Reservoir in the background)

In August 1949, a BEA Douglas DC3 crashed into the hill at Wimberry Stones at the top of the Chew Valley killing 24 passengers and crew and leaving eight survivors.

The moor was the burial site of at least four victims of the serial killers Ian Brady and Myra Hindley; consequently, the murders they committed became known as the Moors murders. In October 1965, following their arrest for the murder of Edward Evans in Hattersley, the bodies of Lesley Ann Downey and John Kilbride were discovered buried on the moors. Kilbride had been murdered on the moors by Brady on 23 November 1963; Downey had been murdered, at the couple's house, on Boxing Day 1964, before being buried on the moor the next day. The police were led to Saddleworth Moor by photographs found among Brady's possessions, and claims by Hindley's brother-in-law that Brady had boasted of committing several murders and burying the bodies on the moor. The body of Pauline Reade, their first victim, who had been murdered on the moors on 12 July 1963, was recovered on 1 July 1987, a year after the pair admitted the murder. They also admitted murdering Keith Bennett and burying his body on the moors in June 1964, although more than 60 years on his body has still not been found. On 30 September 2022 Greater Manchester Police searched for the body of Bennett after receiving information from amateur investigator and author Russell Edwards. On 7 October the police announced they had ended their search without finding any sign of human remains.

In December 2015, the body of an unknown man was found beneath Rob's Rocks on the track between Chew and Dovestone Reservoirs. He had died of strychnine poisoning. He was identified in January 2017 as David Lytton who had flown from Pakistan two days before his body was found.

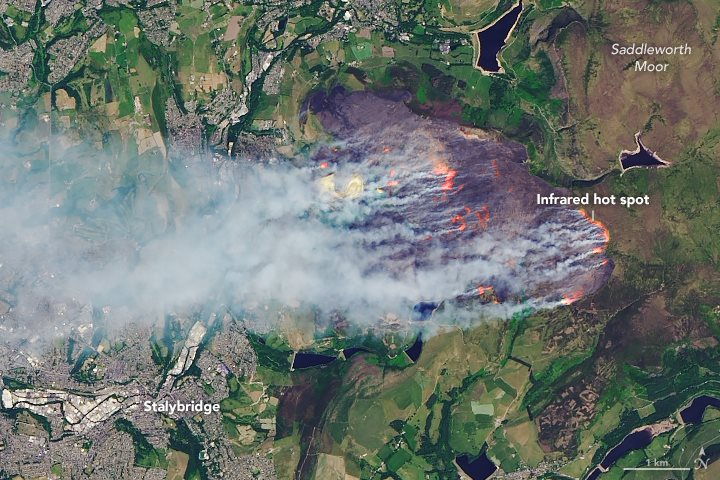
NASA satellite image of smoke rising from fires on Saddleworth Moor on 27 June 2018

A wildfire broke out on the moor on 24 June 2018, resulting in mass evacuations and damage to a large area. Fifty homes were evacuated and about 150 people have been affected in Carrbrook, near Stalybridge. On 30 June firefighters were still fighting the blaze. Greater Manchester Mayor Andy Burnham said a "request to the military for extra support" was being prepared "so there is a back-up plan" to support firefighters and the military have been brought in. As a peat moor, the fire burns primarily underground before setting different parts of the moor alight, which makes it particularly hard to fight as well as releasing excessive smoke and reaching extremely high temperatures. It was predicted by fire chiefs that it could grow on for another few weeks after the fire first ignited.

Jonathan Reynolds said ministers would "need to look seriously at our capacity to deal with these kinds of fires in future, including military capacity we might have lost in recent years".

In February 2019, on the warmest winter day on record, a blaze, described by witnesses as "apocalyptic" occurred on the moor.
