= Chew Reservoir =

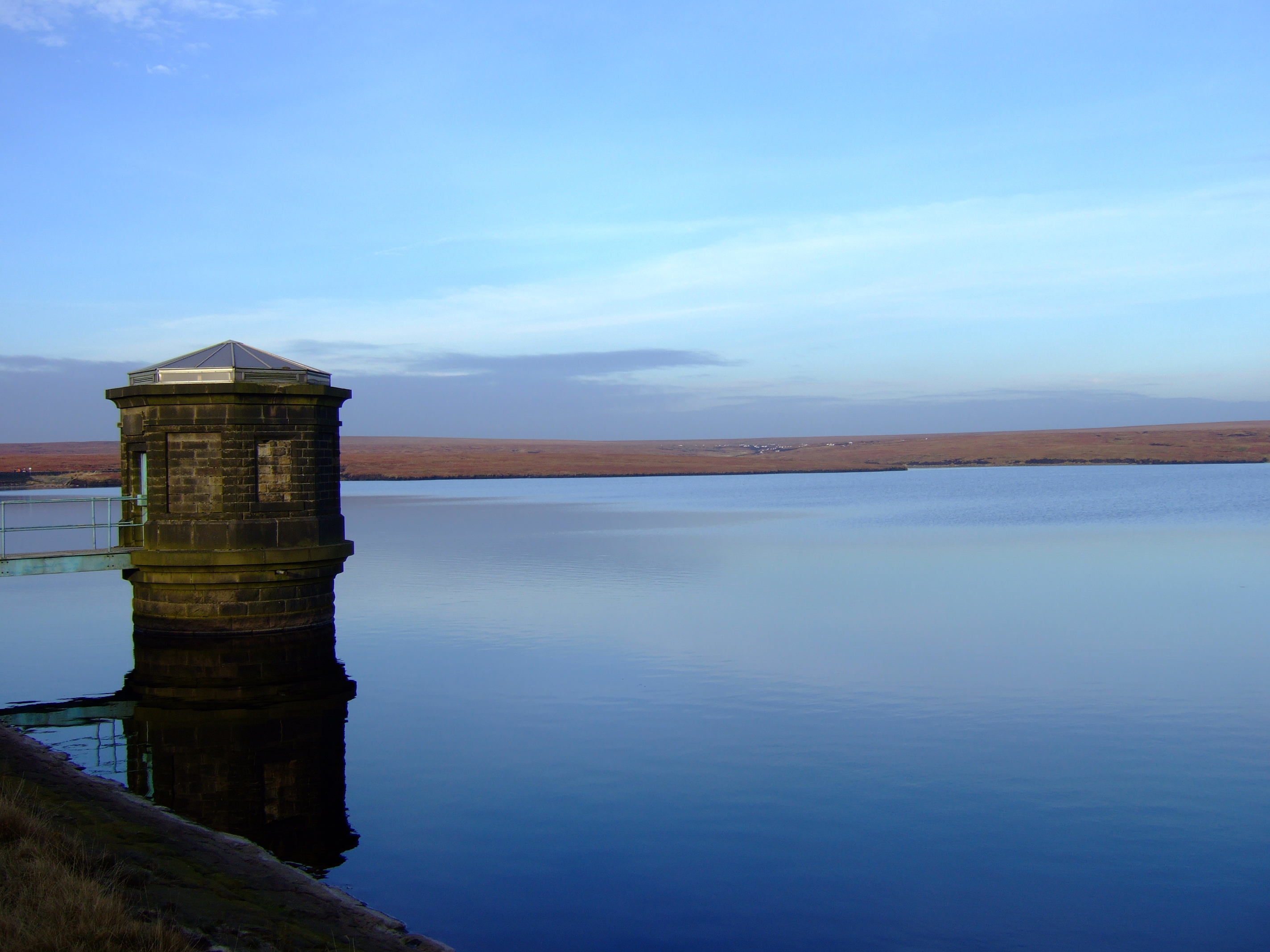

- Location within Greater Manchester
- Location: Greater Manchester
- Coordinates: 53.51°N 1.94°W
- Type: Reservoir
- Primary inflows: Chew Clough, Green Grain, Dry Clough, South Clough and Small Clough
- Primary outflows: Chew Brook
- Basin countries: United Kingdom

Chew Reservoir is a reservoir at the head of the Chew Valley in the Peak District National Park in Greater Manchester, England.

The reservoir scheme in the Greenfield and Chew Valleys by the Ashton-under-Lyne, Stalybridge and Dukinfield (District) Waterworks Joint Committee commenced in 1870. Chew Reservoir was built to hold 200 million gallons of water. Intended to be a compensation reservoir, it also had a filtration plant so that it could be used for drinking water in times of drought. Completed in 1912, the reservoir was the highest constructed in England, at 1,600 feet (488 m) above sea level, until the Cow Green Reservoir in the North Pennines in Teesside was completed in 1971. The reservoir is connected to the larger Dovestone Reservoir further down the Chew Valley by the Chew Brook.
