= A635 road =

Road in England

Coordinates: 53.57324°N 1.74511°W

A635

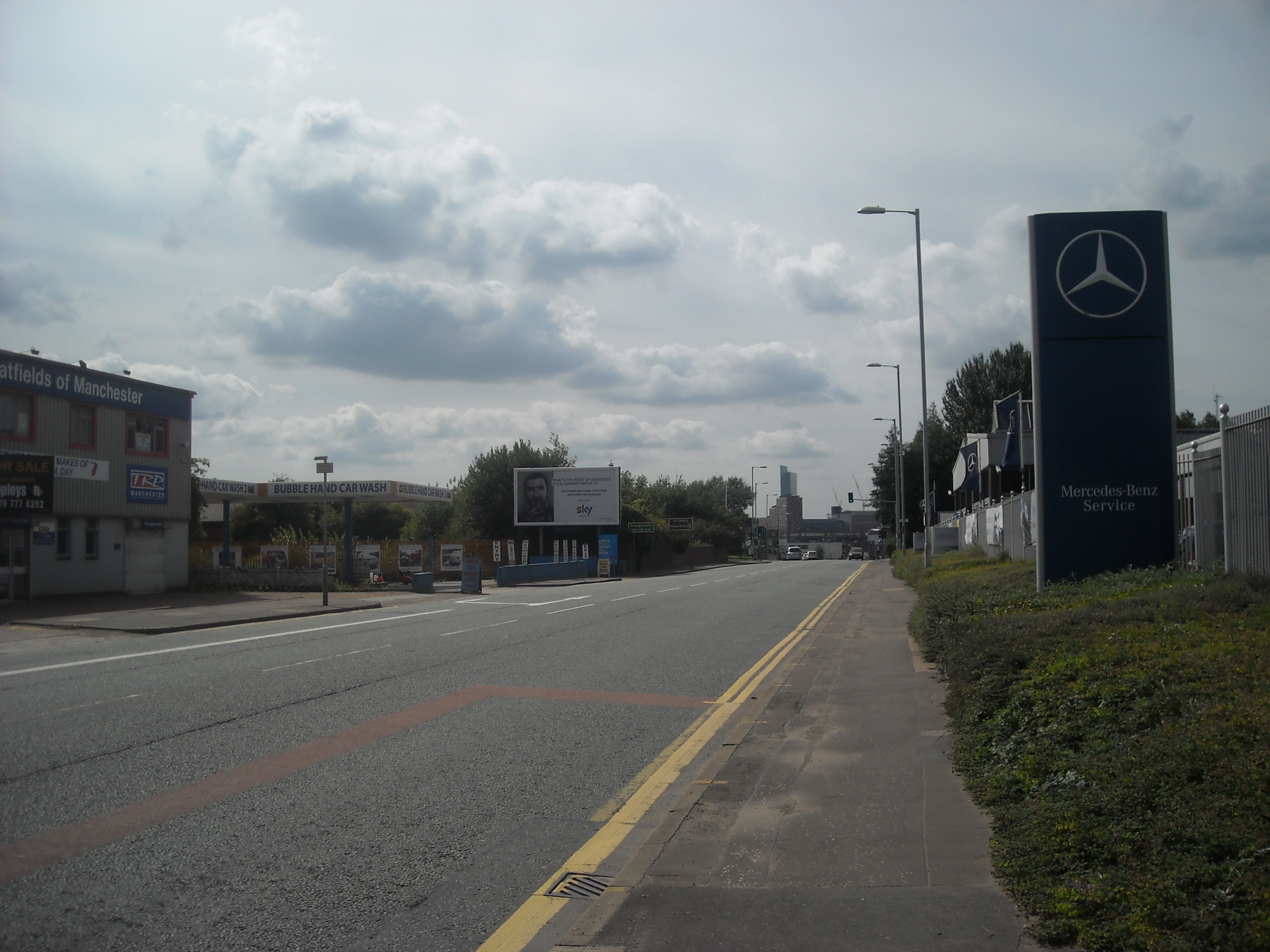
- A635 as Ashton Old Road in Beswick, Greater Manchester

Major junctions
- West end: Manchester

- A6; A57 A6010 A627 A670 A6018 A616 A629 A636 A637; A61 A628 A6195; A1

- East end: A638 near Doncaster

Location
- Country: United Kingdom
- Primary destinations: Manchester; Ashton-under-Lyne; Holmfirth; Huddersfield; Barnsley

Road network
- Roads in the United Kingdom; Motorways; A and B road zones
← A634	→ A636

The A635 is a main road that runs between Manchester and Doncaster running east–west through Stalybridge, Saddleworth Moor, Holmfirth, Barnsley and the Dearne Valley. The section forming the eastern part of the Mancunian Way is a motorway and is officially designated as the A635(M) though there is no road sign with this designation, and the signs at the entrance of Mancunian Way westbound show A57(M).

== Saddleworth Moor ==
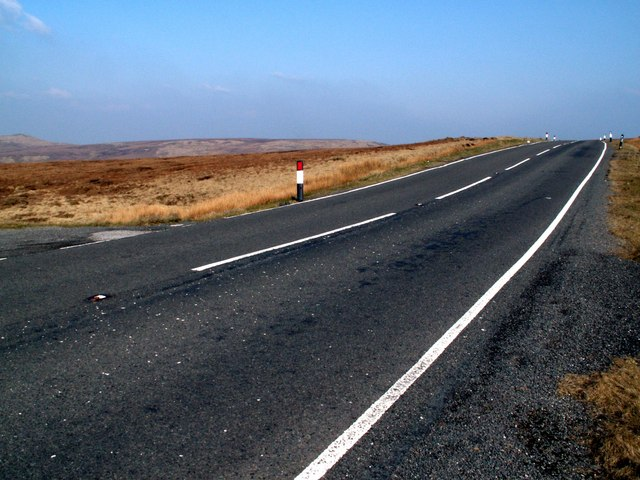
Between Holmfirth and Greenfield

The section between Greenfield and Holmfirth, which passes across Saddleworth Moor, is known locally as the Isle of Skye Road after a public house that was at Wessenden Head until it was demolished in the 1950s after a fire. It passes over treeless high moor top for about 4 miles: Saddleworth Moor west of the watershed and Wessenden Head Moor to the east. This section of the road is at high altitude and in winter months local snowfall usually results in closures of the road. In January 2010, as a result of the extreme winter, the road was closed for over a month, and other closures also occurred in the same winter.

== Pennines ==
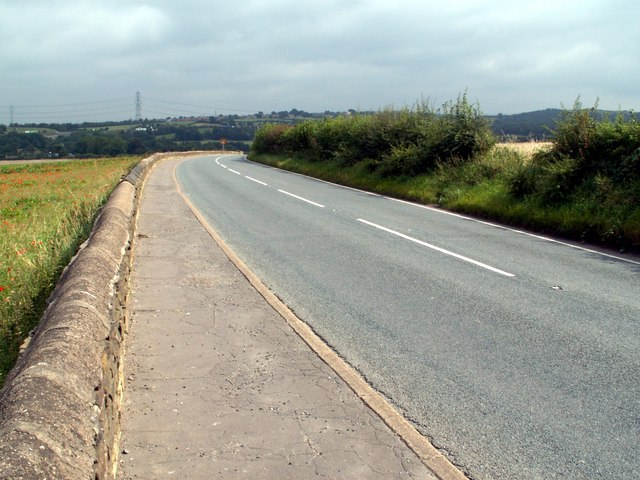
Between Cawthorne and Barugh Green

Unlike the other Pennine passes in the area such as the A57 Snake Pass (Manchester to Sheffield), the A62 (Manchester to Huddersfield and Leeds) and the A58 (Rochdale to Halifax and Leeds), the section of the A635 over the Pennines enjoys much quieter traffic since the A628 Woodhead pass is much more direct when travelling between Manchester and Barnsley, connecting directly to the M1 junction 37 and passing through the centre of Barnsley. In 2012, after an increase of car incident rates on the moors, a 50 mph speed limit was put in place between Greenfield and the boundary with Kirklees. In Barugh Green there's a small junction where the B6428 terminates. The road continues through Barnsley to Doncaster where it merges with the A638.

== 1960s Moors murders ==
The road became infamous because of its connection with the 1960s Moors murders. The grave sites of victims are located adjacent to the road above Greenfield, close to an area called Hollin Brown Knoll, which overlooks the 3 reservoirs: Dovestone, Yeoman and Greenfield.

== August 2015 road closure ==
A section of the road at the Manchester end had to be closed in August 2015 after it collapsed following unusually torrential rain.
