= Glasgow Corporation Waterworks =

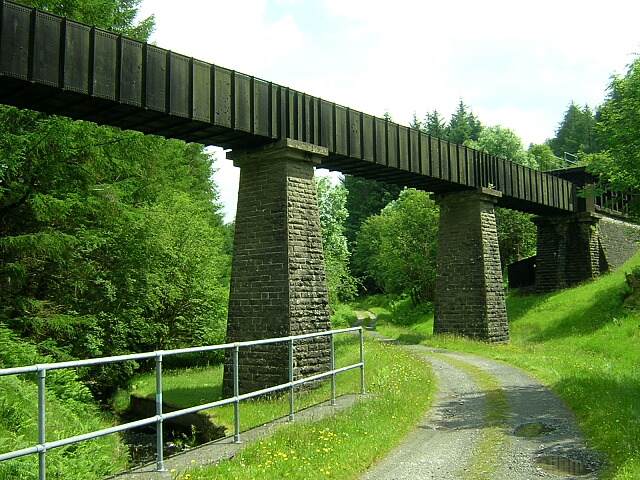
- The aqueduct which carries water from Loch Katrine to Glasgow
- Industry: Water
- Fate: Taken over
- Headquarters: Glasgow, Scotland

Glasgow Corporation Waterworks and its successors have provided a public water supply and sewerage and sewage treatment services to the Scottish city of Glasgow. There were several schemes in the early part of the 1800s, with the Glasgow Company which was established in 1806 pumping filtered water from the River Clyde into the city. The Gorbals Gravitation Water Company was established in 1846, and brought water from reservoirs to the south-west of the city. However, an outbreak of cholera in 1848/1849, in which 4,000 people died, concentrated the minds of Glasgow Council, and in 1855 a scheme to use water from Loch Katrine, 36 miles (58 km) to the north, was authorised. The work required at Loch Katrine was quite modest, and the major construction work was the building of an aqueduct to carry the water to the city by gravity.

The civil engineer John Frederick Bateman managed the contract, but the engineer for final section into the city was James Morris Gale, who became the Engineer in Chief for the Glasgow Water Commissioners when the project was completed in 1859. He oversaw the development of the system, with levels in Loch Katrine being raised and a second aqueduct being constructed, until he retired in 1902. Extra water was obtained from Loch Arklet in 1914, when a dam and tunnel into Loch Katrine were completed, but a similar scheme to impound water in Glen Finglas and feed it through a tunnel to Loch Katrine was delayed by the First World War, and was not implemented until 1965. A new treatment works at Milngavie costing £120 million was completed in 2008 and opened by Queen Elizabeth.

Glasgow also invested in sewerage, with sewage treatment works opening at Dalmarnock in 1894, Dalmuir in 1904 and Shieldhall in 1910. They carried out research into better ways to treat sewage, and until 1935 sold sludge cakes as "Globe Fertiliser". Surplus sludge was carried away by a fleet of sludge ships, to be dumped at sea, and the ships also took passengers along for the voyage, initially to help recuperating soldiers, but later for the general public. A major upgrade to the sewerage infrastructure took place in 2017, when a 3.1-mile (5.0 km) tunnel was completed, to provide storm water storage, a project which reduces flood risk, and should ensure that the River Clyde is not polluted by sewage overflows in storm conditions.

== History ==
Glasgow Water Act 1806
- Act of Parliament
- Parliament of the United Kingdom
- Long title: An Act for supplying the City and Suburbs of Glasgow with Water.
- Citation: 46 Geo. 3. c. cxxxvi

Dates
- Royal assent: 21 July 1806

Text of statute as originally enacted

The earliest known records of activity concerning a public water supply in Glasgow date from 1805, when the civil engineer Thomas Telford produced a report on schemes for supplying Glasgow and its suburbs with water. In 1806 he produced a second report and an act of Parliament, the Glasgow Water Act 1806 (46 Geo. 3. c. cxxxvi) was obtained to create the Company of Proprietors of the Glasgow Waterworks, also known as the "Glasgow Company". They took advice from the Scottish inventor and mechanical engineer James Watt, and plans for a water treatment works on the north bank of the River Clyde were drawn up by Telford. The company constructed filtering beds and ponds, and bought two Boulton and Watt steam engines, but the system did not work well, and a new works was constructed on the south bank. In order to filter water from the river, they constructed a tunnel below river level, with open joints between the bricks, which allowed water to seep through the river bank, which was formed of sand, and to be drawn off from the tunnel. Although the filtering was not particularly efficient, the system lasted for 30 years, and provided 3 million imperial gallons (14 Ml) per day on average, with the amount available depending on the river level.

Cranston Hill Waterworks Act 1808
- Act of Parliament
- Parliament of the United Kingdom
- Long title: An Act for the further Supply of the City and Suburbs of Glasgow and Places adjacent with Water.
- Citation: 48 Geo. 3. c. xliv

Dates
- Royal assent: 27 May 1808

Text of statute as originally enacted

Cranston Hill Waterworks Act 1812
- Act of Parliament
- Parliament of the United Kingdom
- Long title: An Act to enable the Company of Proprietors of the Cranston Hill Water Works to raise more Money for the further Supply of the City and Suburbs of Glasgow, and Places adjacent, with Water.
- Citation: 52 Geo. 3. c. lii

Dates
- Royal assent: 20 April 1812

Text of statute as originally enacted

A second company, the Company of Proprietors of the Cranston Hill Water Works, was established by the Cranston Hill Waterworks Act 1812 (52 Geo. 3. c. lii). The civil engineer and statistician James Cleland produced a report in 1813, on a scheme for raising and distributing water, and building public baths, and there was a flurry of activity in the 1830s. James Jardine, who was engineer for much of the early work for the Edinburgh Water Company, was consulted in 1834, Thomas Grainger published a report on the Glasgow water supply in 1835, and Robert Thom, the designer of the self-cleaning sand filter used in water purification, produced another report in 1837. The Glasgow Company took over the other company in 1838, but the quality of the water they supplied was poor, and there was general dissatisfaction with their performance. This resulted in a number of alternative schemes being considered.

The first was a scheme to exploit the waters of Loch Lubnaig, in the River Callender catchment, some 80 miles (130 km) to the north of Glasgow. This was abandoned when it was discovered that more compensation water would be required than the loch could hold. The neighbouring Loch Katrine was also considered, but was not pursued at that time. The engineer Nathaniel Beardmore moved to London in 1843, where he collaborated with James Meadows Rendel on a project for the Glasgow Gravitation Water Company. The scheme was for a reservoir at Gilmerston, in the valley of the River Avon, and a 24-mile (39 km) aqueduct to transport the water to Glasgow. Some work was carried out in 1844, but the project was abandoned in early 1845.

Glasgow Waterworks Act 1846
- Act of Parliament
- Parliament of the United Kingdom
- Long title: An Act to enable the Company of Proprietors of the Glasgow Waterworks to introduce an additional Supply of Water to the City and Suburbs of Glasgow.
- Citation: 9 & 10 Vict. c. xxi

Dates
- Royal assent: 14 May 1846

Gorbals Gravitation Water Company Act 1846
- Act of Parliament
- Parliament of the United Kingdom
- Long title: An Act for further and better supplying with Water the Barony or Regality of Gorbals and Places adjacent.
- Citation: 9 & 10 Vict. c. cccxlvii

Dates
- Royal assent: 3 August 1846

Other legislation
- Amended by: Gorbals Gravitation Water Company Act 1850

Text of statute as originally enacted

Gorbals Gravitation Water Company Act 1850
- Act of Parliament
- Parliament of the United Kingdom
- Long title: An Act to amend "The Gorbals Gravitation Water Company Act, 1846," to authorize the Extension of the Works, and the Construction of new Works to supply the Town or Royal Burgh of Rutherglen and other Places with Water.
- Citation: 13 & 14 Vict. c. xcii

Dates
- Royal assent: 5 August 1850

Other legislation
- Amends: Gorbals Gravitation Water Company Act 1846

Text of statute as originally enacted

Gorbals Gravitation Water Company Act 1853
- Act of Parliament
- Parliament of the United Kingdom
- Long title: An Act to amend the Gorbals Gravitation Water Company's Acts, to authorize the Extension of their Works to supply the Royal Burgh of Renfrew and Suburbs and other Places with Water, and for other Purposes.
- Citation: 16 & 17 Vict. c. xcviii

Dates
- Royal assent: 8 July 1853

Text of statute as originally enacted

One successful scheme was the Gorbals Gravitation Water Company, which obtained the Gorbals Gravitation Water Company Act 1846 (9 & 10 Vict. c. cccxlvii), allowing them to supply water to the population living to the south of the Clyde, obtained from a catchment of 2,560 acres (1,040 ha) to the south-west of Glasgow. The engineer for the scheme was William Gale, who supervised the construction of the works and two earth dams to impound the water, at Waulkmill Glen and Ryat Linn. The initial phase was completed in 1848, and a second phase, which included the construction of a third reservoir at Balgray, was finished in 1854. The reservoir outlets were arranged so that water could be drawn off at several different levels, and the scheme produced about 5.5 million imperial gallons (25 Ml) per day, of which 1.5 million imperial gallons (6.8 Ml) were required for compensation water, to maintain flows in the river system, and the rest was available to the people of Glasgow. Some 75,000 benefitted from a constant supply of good quality filtered water, as Gale strongly advocated that water should be available all the time.

Glasgow Corporation Waterworks Act 1855
- Act of Parliament
- Parliament of the United Kingdom
- Long title: An Act to authorize and empower the Magistrates and Council of the City of Glasgow to supply with Water the said City and Suburbs thereof, and Districts and Places adjacent; to purchase and acquire the Glasgow Waterworks, and the Gorbals Gravitation Waterworks; and to introduce an additional Supply of Water from Loch Katrine; and for other Purposes.
- Citation: 18 & 19 Vict. c. cxviii

Dates
- Royal assent: 2 July 1855

Glasgow Corporation Waterworks Amendment Act 1859
- Act of Parliament
- Parliament of the United Kingdom
- Long title: An Act to authorize the Commissioners of the Glasgow Corporation Waterworks to raise a further Sum of Money; and to amend "The Glasgow Corporation Waterworks Act, 1855."
- Citation: 22 Vict. c. ix

Dates
- Royal assent: 19 April 1859

Other legislation
- Amends: Glasgow Corporation Waterworks Act 1855

Glasgow Corporation Waterworks Amendment Act 1860
- Act of Parliament
- Parliament of the United Kingdom
- Long title: An Act to authorize the Commissioners of the Glasgow Corporation Waterworks to raise a further Sum of Money.
- Citation: 23 & 24 Vict. c. xxxiii

Dates
- Royal assent: 15 May 1860

Text of statute as originally enacted

Glasgow Corporation Waterworks Amendment Act 1865
- Act of Parliament
- Parliament of the United Kingdom
- Long title: An Act to authorize the Commissioners of the Glasgow Corporation Waterworks to construct a Bridge for carrying the Aqueduct from Loch Katrine to Glasgow over the River Endrick; to provide for the better Distribution of Water; and for other Purposes.
- Citation: 28 & 29 Vict. c. lxix

Dates
- Royal assent: 2 June 1865

Glasgow Corporation Waterworks Amendment Act 1866
- Act of Parliament
- Parliament of the United Kingdom
- Long title: An Act to authorize the Commissioners of the Glasgow Corporation Waterworks to construct Reservoirs and other Works, and to take Water from the River Clyde; to provide for the Removal of the Weir across the said River; and for other Purposes.
- Citation: 29 & 30 Vict. c. cccxxviii

Dates
- Royal assent: 6 August 1866

Glasgow Corporation Waterworks Act 1873
- Act of Parliament
- Parliament of the United Kingdom
- Long title: An Act to extend the time for the construction of Works authorised by "The Glasgow Corporation Waterworks Amendment Act, 1866," and to abandon part of the Works; and for other purposes.
- Citation: 36 & 37 Vict. c. xxxvi

Dates
- Royal assent: 26 May 1873

Other legislation
- Amends: Glasgow Corporation Waterworks Amendment Act 1866

Glasgow Corporation Waterworks Amendment Act 1877
- Act of Parliament
- Parliament of the United Kingdom
- Long title: An Act to authorise the Commissioners of the Glasgow Corporation Waterworks to raise a further sum of money to construct additional works and acquire additional lands; and for other purposes.
- Citation: 40 & 41 Vict. c. clxv

Dates
- Royal assent: 2 August 1877

Text of statute as originally enacted

Glasgow Corporation Waterworks Amendment Act 1879
- Act of Parliament
- Parliament of the United Kingdom
- Long title: An Act to authorise the Commissioners of the Glasgow Corporation Waterworks to construct additional Works; and for other purposes.
- Citation: 42 & 43 Vict. c. xl

Dates
- Royal assent: 23 May 1879

Other legislation
- Repealed by: Glasgow Corporation Consolidation (Water, Transport and Markets) Order Confirmation Act 1964

Status: Repealed

Text of statute as originally enacted

Residents in other parts of the city were not so fortunate, as the insanitary conditions led to an outbreak of cholera in 1848/1849, in which around 4,000 people died. In 1852 there was an attempt to revive the Loch Lubnaig scheme, but this was opposed in Parliament by Glasgow Council, and in this they were assisted by the civil engineer John Frederick Bateman. Having defeated the bill, they asked Bateman for advice on a suitable water supply, and he favoured the Loch Katrine scheme. The council then sought advice from other engineers on that and other schemes, but both Stephenson and Brunel supported Bateman's proposal. The council therefore sought authorisation for it, and the Glasgow Corporation Waterworks Act 1855 (18 & 19 Vict. c. cxviii) was obtained on 12 July 1855.

=== Loch Katrine ===
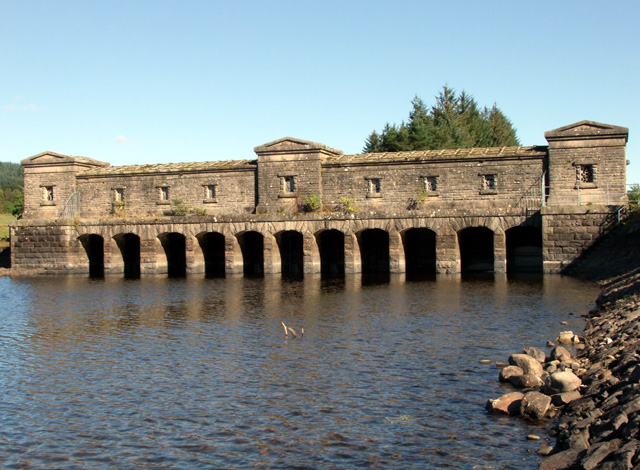
The sluice house on Loch Venachar, which controlled the release of compensation water.

Compared to the massive earth dams that were being built to supply Edinburgh with water at a similar time, the reservoir works for the Loch Katrine scheme were rather modest. Water was stored in the loch by allowing the water levels to vary between 4 feet (1,200 mm) above the normal level and 3 feet (910 mm) below it. The Glasgow Corporation Waterworks Act 1855 allowed 50 million imperial gallons (230 Ml) per day to be taken into the water supply, but in order to maintain flows on the river system below it, the outlet of Loch Venachar was also modified, so that it could be controlled to supply 40.5 million imperial gallons (184 Ml) of compensation water per day. The water level of Loch Katrine is 364 feet (111 m) above sea level, and water for Glasgow is conveyed by gravity along an aqueduct to a reservoir at Mugdock, some 10 miles (16 km) from the city centre. The aqueduct is 26 miles (42 km) long, of which 13 miles (21 km) is tunnel, 9 miles (14 km) consists of an open channel or bridges, and the rest is made from pipelines. The tunnelled sections and cuts were designed to carry the maximum allowed by the act, but the pipelines were only sized to allow half of that volume initially. The service reservoir at Mugdock held 548 million imperial gallons (2,490 Ml), and from there it was conveyed into the city through twin 36-inch (910 mm) pipes. The scheme was completed in 1859 and was formally opened by Queen Victoria, having cost £918,000.

The aqueduct includes 70 tunnels, with one just south of Loch Katrine being 2,325 yards (2,126 m) long and 600 feet (183 m) below the land surface at its deepest point. Twelve access shafts were constructed to allow work to proceed at multiple faces. 25 bridges were needed to carry the aqueduct pipes over depressions. That across the Duchray valley is 636 feet (194 m) long, and its masonry piers are up to 52 feet (15.8 m) high. It originally carried a single pipe, but a second was added above the first in the 1860s. A third pipe was added in 1881, carried by a steel trussed girder bridge on sandstone piers. The longest bridge is at Corrie, and is 996 feet (304 m) long. Castle Burn is crossed by a bridge 441 feet (134.4 m) long, and there are three bridges at Couligarten, with lengths of 372 feet (113.4 m), 462 feet (140.8 m) and 636 feet (194 m). The masonry was built of dry stone, but mortar was added in the 1860s.

Glasgow Corporation Waterworks Amendment Act 1882
- Act of Parliament
- Parliament of the United Kingdom
- Long title: An Act to authorise the Commissioners of the Glasgow Corporation Waterworks to construct an additional Service Reservoir and other Works; and for other purposes.
- Citation: 45 & 46 Vict. c. lxxxvii

Dates
- Royal assent: 3 July 1882

Text of statute as originally enacted

Glasgow Corporation Waterworks Act 1885
- Act of Parliament
- Parliament of the United Kingdom
- Long title: An Act to authorise the Commissioners of the Glasgow Corporation Waterworks to obtain an additional supply of Water; to construct additional Waterworks and other Works; and for other purposes.
- Citation: 48 & 49 Vict. c. cxxxvi

Dates
- Royal assent: 31 July 1885

Text of statute as originally enacted

Glasgow Corporation Waterworks Act 1892
- Act of Parliament
- Parliament of the United Kingdom
- Long title: An Act to authorise the Commissioners of the Glasgow Corporation Waterworks to construct Deviations of their Aqueduct and Works in the Counties of Perth and Stirling and for other purposes.
- Citation: 55 & 56 Vict. c. cxi

Dates
- Royal assent: 20 June 1892

Text of statute as originally enacted

While Bateman had managed the main pipeline, James Morris Gale became the resident engineer for the city section of the project. After it all opened in 1859, he became Engineer in Chief for the Glasgow Water Commissioners, a post he held for over 40 years until he retired in 1902. By 1882, the supply from Loch Katrine was no longer sufficient, and he suggested a scheme to double the pipeline, raise the levels in Loch Katrine a little more, and to obtain further sources from other lochs in the vicinity of Loch Katrine. The Glasgow Corporation Waterworks Amendment Act 1882 (45 & 46 Vict. c. lxxxvii) and the Glasgow Corporation Waterworks Act 1885 (48 & 49 Vict. c. cxxxvi) were obtained, which allowed the level of Loch Katrine to be raised by 5 feet (1.5 m). This required the construction of a new dam, which was located just downstream of the first dam, and had nine sluices to control compensation water, rather than the four of the original dam. This work was carried out using direct labour between 1886 and 1896, and an official opening took place on 21 June 1901. Gale chose a more direct route for the new aqueduct, which involved more tunnelling, but by this time pneumatic drills and better explosives were available, and he felt that the long bridges such as that at Duchray were the least satisfactory element of the original design. Friction in the tunnels of the first route had reduced the throughput below what had been expected, and the new tunnels were lined with concrete to improve flows. The revised route for the second aqueduct was 2.2 miles (3.5 km) shorter, and the possible throughput with both aqueducts in use increased to 70 million imperial gallons (320 Ml) per day.

At Milngavie, Mugdock Reservoir was built as a holding reservoir for water arriving from Loch Katrine. A number of buildings with rubble walls and slate roofs dating from this first phase survive. In the 1890s when the pipeline was doubled, Craigmaddie reservoir was built to act as a second holding reservoir. Work started on 1 May 1896 and it was completed on 11 June 1896, but there were problems with leakage, and a deep trench was cut to resolve the issue, so it was not operational until 1 January 1897. A causeway and dam, which is faced with rubble, separates the two reservoirs. Both reservoirs have a draw-off tower and straining well, to remove debris from the water supply. The straining wells were decommissioned in 2007 as part of the construction of a new treatment works.

A further act, the Glasgow Corporation (Water and General) Order Confirmation Act 1902 (2 Edw. 7. c. cclxi), was obtained which authorised the construction of a 1,050-foot (320 m) dam at the western end of Loch Arklet to impound the water, and a tunnel through a ridge of hills at the eastern end, allowing the water to flow into Loch Katrine. Work on this scheme began in 1909, and was completed in 1914. Construction of a dam across the River Turk to impound water in Glen Finglas and excavation of a connecting tunnel to Loch Katrine was authorised by an act of Parliament of 1903, but little work was done due to the start of the First World War. By the time hostilities ceased, construction costs had risen significantly, and the project was deferred, with the tunnel finally being completed in 1958 and the dam in 1965. As the Glen Finglas scheme did not proceed at that time, the level of Loch Katrine was raised by another 5 feet (1.5 m) between 1919 and 1929, by raising the height of the dam. The extra height meant that the dam also had to be lengthened, and it was extended to 240 feet (73 m). When the work was completed, it allowed the top 17 feet (5.2 m) of the loch to be used for water supply, representing a reserve of nine months.

=== Development ===
Restructuring of the water industry has followed a different path in Scotland to that of England and Wales. The Water (Scotland) Act 1967 was an attempt to consolidate the large number of water supply authorities, and created 13 regional water boards. Responsibility for Glasgow's water supply passed to the Lower Clyde Water Board, along with eleven other suppliers. Under the Local Government (Scotland) Act 1973, the functions of the water boards were taken over by regional councils, who were also given responsibility for sewerage and sewage treatment. Control of these functions works passed to Strathclyde Regional Council. It subsequently passed to the West of Scotland Water Authority in 1996, and in 2002 was transferred to the newly formed Scottish Water.

As regulations for water quality have become more stringent, there has been a need for more water treatment before water enters the domestic supply system. For the Loch Katrine water supply, this is handled by a works at Balmore and a new treatment works at Milngavie, which is partly underground, cost £120 million and was completed in 2008. The need for a new works was highlighted in August 2002, when following the 2002 Glasgow floods, the waterborne parasite cryptosporidium was found in the Mugdock reservoir, and 140,000 people had to boil their water before drinking it, until the problem could be eradicated. The construction project for the works was managed by Black & Veatch, and the impact on the landscape was reduced by constructing part of the works below ground, and using lamella clarifiers, which take up less room than sludge cone settlement tanks. The works was formally opened by Queen Elizabeth and won the 2007 Utility Industry Achievement Award, having been completed ahead of its time schedule and for £10 million less than its budgeted cost.

=== Sewerage ===
Since the publication of Edwin Chadwick's Report on the Sanitary Condition of the Labouring Population of Great Britain in 1842, there had been a growing understanding that the health of people in cities depended both on a clean water supply and an efficient method of disposal and treatment of sewage, to prevent the occurrence of waterborne diseases such as cholera. Despite such knowledge, little was done to provide sewers until there was a general outcry about the state of the River Clyde and other watercourses. When the Caledonian Railway wanted to construct tunnels below Glasgow's streets, a condition of their authorisation was that they had to reconstruct the sewers, such as they were, and on this they spent £200,000. The sewers became part of Glasgow Corporation's main drainage scheme, which served an area of 25,000 acres (100 km^{2}). Glasgow was effectively divided into three, with each sector having its own sewage treatment works. Dalmarnock Works was the first to open in 1894, to be followed by Dalmuir in 1904 and Shieldhall in 1910.

Dalmarnock Sewage Treatment Works was the first large-scale installation of its type in Scotland. Gustav Valentine Alsing, who was Danish and an acknowledged expert on chemical precipitation, designed the works. Construction began in 1893 and it was completed the following year. Sewage flowed into the works through three 4 feet (1.2 m) channels, were floating material was screened off and incinerated. Grit, sand and other heavy solids settled out in catch pits, and was transported away from the site by railway, as the Caledonian Railway had a siding into the works. The liquor passed into 24 settling tanks, each able to hold 81,000 imperial gallons (368,000 L), was aerated, and then entered 60 coke filters, which covered an area of 3 acres (1.2 ha). Sand filters provided the final stage of treatment, before the liquid was discharged into the Clyde. The coke filters were not particularly successful, and were abandoned in favour of precipitation. Sludge from this process was mixed with lime and the water content removed in filter presses, to form sludge cakes, which were also removed from the site by rail. A Cunmor drying plant was then installed, and the sludge cakes were marketed as "Globe Fertiliser", with sales reaching 32,000 tons per year by 1911. However, the works produced a greater volume than this, and the surplus was taken by boat to be dumped at sea near Garrock Head on the Isle of Bute. Production of "Globe Fertiliser" lasted until 1935.

The works experimented with bacterial treatment in 1900, and eight bacterial beds were constructed. Filter beds covering 5 acres (2 ha) followed in 1913, as a test bed for biological filtration. In 1914, a pumping main was constructed to carry untreated sludge from the works to the Shieldhall works, from where sludge boats took it to be dumped at sea. The pipeline was 6 miles (9.7 km) long and 9 inches (230 mm) in diameter. Ardern and Lockett had discovered the Activated Sludge Process while carrying out research at the Davyhulme Sewage Works in Manchester in 1914, and when the works was in need of improvement in the 1930s, a Simplex Activated Sludge Plant was built to try out the new process. A full activated sludge plant was built between 1962 and 1968 by the consulting engineers Babtie, Shaw & Morton, at a cost of £4 million.

The sewerage infrastructure was improved significantly in 2017, with the completion of a tunnel 3.1 miles (5.0 km) long, which provides 20 million imperial gallons (90 Ml) of storm water storage. It will reduce the risk of flooding and the likelihood that sewage will overflow into the Clyde during storms. The tunnel runs between Craigton and Queen's Park in south Glasgow, is 15.5 feet (4.7 m) in diameter, and was constructed by a consortium of Costain and Vinci Construction Grand Projets.

=== Sludge fleet ===
Once sewage had been processed, much of the sludge was taken by ship to be dumped at sea. Glasgow Corporation owned six ships at various times, and borrowed a seventh briefly. Dalmuir was ordered for the opening of Dalmuir Works, and Shieldhall was ordered for the opening of Shieldhall Works. Dalmuir was replaced by Dalmarnock, and the two ships shared the sludge workings. Shieldhall was loaned to Manchester Corporation between 1941 and 1947, as their vessel which carried sludge from Davyhulme Sewage Works had been destroyed by a mine. Dalmarnock was able to maintain the service from Glasgow, as the sludge was dumped near Loch Long, rather than near the Isle of Bute, due to the presence of a defence boom across the Firth of Clyde near Dunoon. Dumping of sludge at sea was discontinued in 1998, following the implementation of the EU Urban Waste Water Treatment Directive.

Most of the ships also carried passengers on the sludge runs, a tradition the probably began during the First World War, as a way to help convalescing soldiers, although there are suggestions that some poor and elderly passengers may have been carried before that war. Subsequently, the ships carried organised groups of passengers during the summer months. After it had spent a few years working out of Southampton for the Southern Water Authority, the second Shieldhall was bought by the Solent Steam Packet Co in 1988 for preservation, and offers trips from Southampton.

Name	Year built	Builder (yard number)	Capacity (tonnes)	length ft. (m)	Notes
Dalmuir	1904	Wm Beardmore, Govan (481)	1,220	234 (71)	Steamer with twin screws. Sold in 1922, broken up in 1960
Shieldhall	1910	Wm Beardmore, Dalmuir (497)	1,500	260.8 (79.5)	Steamer with twin screws. Loaned to Manchester Corporation 18 March 1941 to 22 April 1947. Scrapped 1955 at Port Glasgow, when new ship with same name entered service.
Dalmarnock	1925	Wm Simmons, Renfrew (671)	1,600	260.3 (79.3)	Steamer with twin screws. Named Dalmarnock II in 1970, broken up in 1971.
Shieldhall	1955	Lobnitz, Renfrew (1132)	1,840	268 (82)	Steamer with twin screws. Replaced previous ship with same name. Sold 1977 to Southern Water Authority. Sold 1988 to Solent Steam Packet Co for preservation. Now operates day trips out of Southampton.
Dalmarnock	1970	James Lamont & Co, Port Glasgow. (412)	3,422	313 (95)	Diesel with twin screws. Replaced previous ship with same name. Sold 1998 to Northumbrian Water. Sold 2007, still in service in 2014.
Garroch Head	1977	James Lamont & Co, Port Glasgow (431)	3,645	324 (99)	Diesel with single screw and bow thrusters. Sold 1998. Still in service in 2014.
Gardyloo	1976	Ferguson Bros, Port Glasgow (471)	2,695	281.8 (85.88)	Diesel with single screw. Built for Lothian Regional Council. Hired from October 1976 to October 1977, before working from Edinburgh.

== In literature and popular culture ==
The 1902 annual inspection of the infrastructure of the Loch Katrine Water Supply Scheme led by Lord Provost Samuel Chisholm was satirised by Neil Munro in the Erchie MacPherson story "Erchie at the Water Trip", published in the Glasgow Evening News on 7th July 1902.

== Bibliography ==
- Binnie, G M (1981). Early Victorian Water Engineers. Thomas Telford. ISBN 978-0-7277-0128-2.
- Cross-Rudkin, Peter; Chrimes, Mike (2008). A Biographical Dictionary of Civil Engineers in Great Britain and Ireland: Vol 2: 1830 to 1890. Thomas Telford. ISBN 978-0-7277-3504-1.
- Lobina, Emanuele; Terhorst, Philipp (29 January 2005). D19: WaterTime case study - Edinburgh, UK. Watertime EU Research Project. Archived from the original on 20 August 2018.
- Matthews, Hugh; Gardiner, Vince (1999). The Changing Geography of the UK (3rd ed.). Routledge. ISBN 978-0-415-17901-0.
- Nicholls, Robert (2015). Davyhulme Sewage Works and its Railway. Narrow Gauge Railway Society. ISBN 978-0-9554326-8-2.
- Parliament (1967). "Water (Scotland) Act 1967" (PDF). www.legislation.gov.uk.
- Skempton, Sir Alec; et al. (2002). A Biographical Dictionary of Civil Engineers in Great Britain and Ireland: Vol 1: 1500 to 1830. Thomas Telford. ISBN 978-0-7277-2939-2.
