= Heatherbank House =

Old house in Milngavie, Scotland

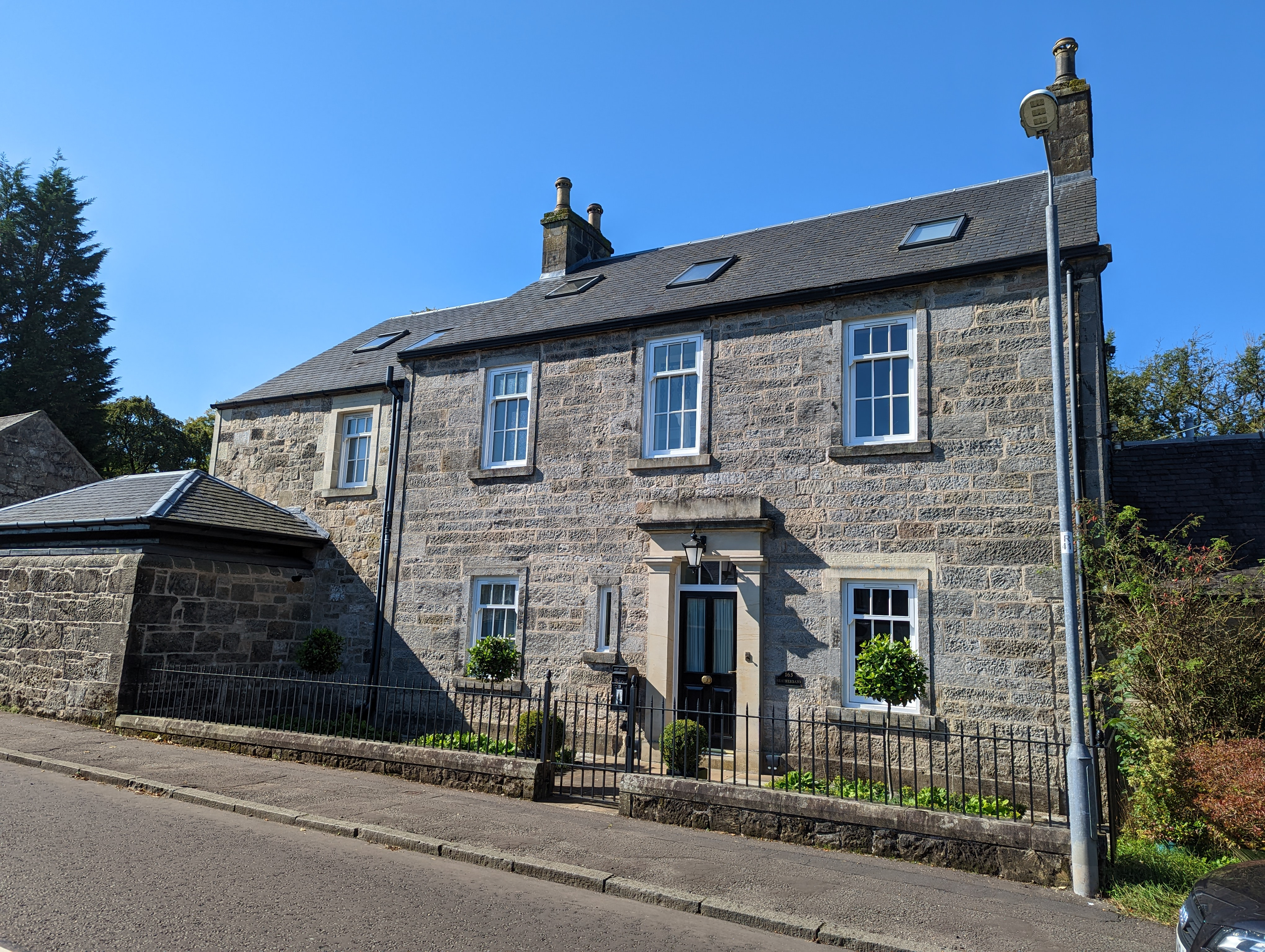
- Heatherbank House in 2022

- Location within Scotland
- 55°56′59″N 04°18′59″W
- Type: House
- Location: Milngavie
- OS grid reference: NS555754

History
- Built: Early 19th century

Site notes
- Area: East Dunbartonshire
- Architectural style: Georgian

Heatherbank House is an early 19th century private house located in Milngavie, Scotland and is one of the oldest buildings in the town. It is the former site of the Heatherbank Museum of Social Work.

== History ==
=== Early history ===
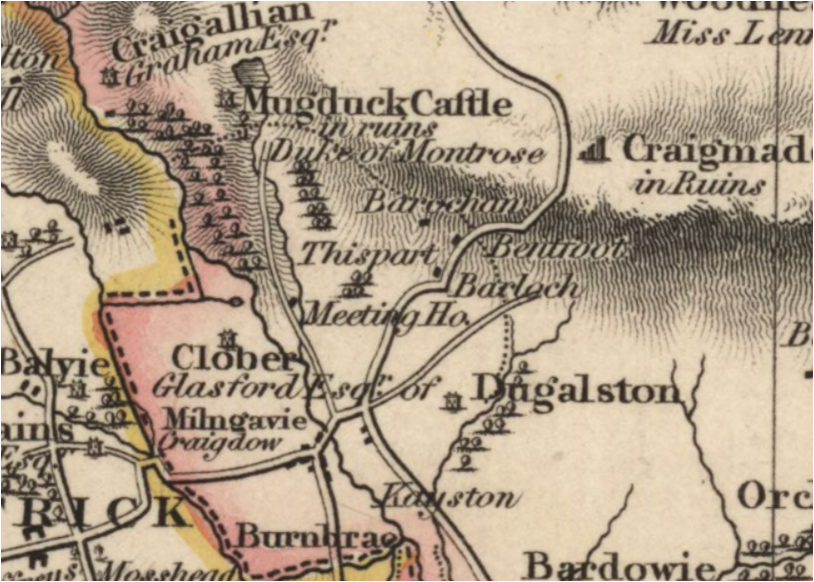
Extract of John Thomson's Atlas of 1832 showing a "Meeting House" at the location of Heatherbank

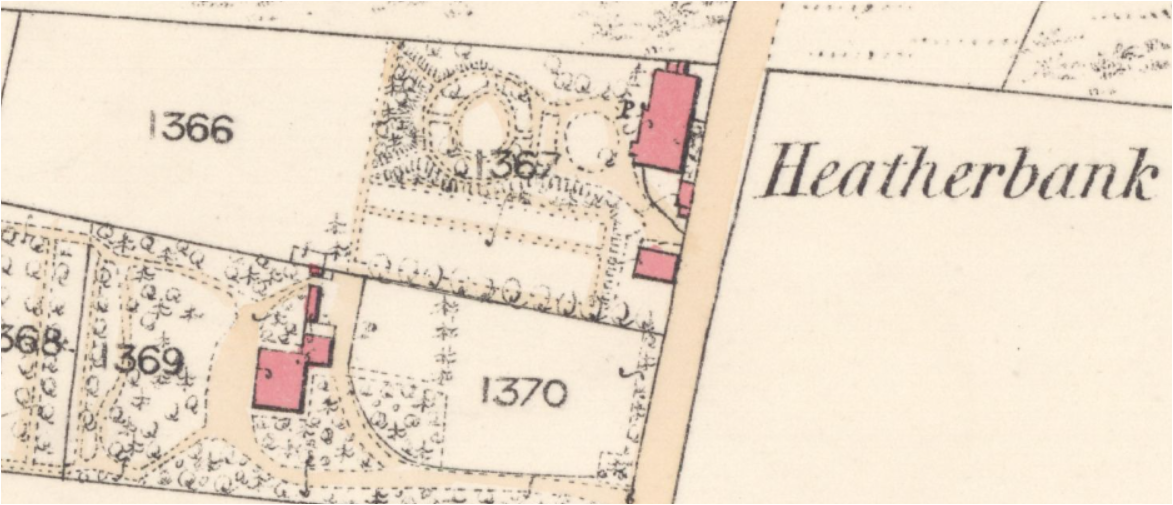
25 inch to 1 mile OS Map of 1860 showing Heatherbank's outline much as it is today

It is unclear when Heatherbank House was constructed. John Thomson's Atlas of Scotland (published 1832) clearly shows a building marked as a "Meeting House" in the location of the modern day house. Deeds show that the property/land was sold by James Burns (Scottish shipowner) to John Blackwood (bleacher) on 5 May 1838.

=== Links to the Milngavie Waterworks ===
In 1852 the engineer John Frederick Bateman was consulted by Glasgow Council in regard to its water supply. In 1854, on Bateman's advice, a bill was obtained to supply water to Glasgow from Loch Katrine. Alfred Moore (engineer) was appointed as his resident engineer and he purchased Heatherbank on 18 November 1856. Work had commenced on Mugdock Reservoir in 1855 and the first section of the works were opened by Queen Victoria in October 1859, however Moore continued to reside at Heatherbank and continue his work until 1865.

=== The McNaughtan's and Australia ===
On 15 December 1865 Moore sold the property to Janet McNaughtan (née Blackwood), widow of the Reverend Alexander McNaughtan who was the local presbyterian minister. The Blackwood family had made some wealth owning the local bleachworks at Craigton. Janet resided in the house with 3 of her daughters; Jennie, Anne and Helen, until her death on 31 March 1875.

Janet's son, Alexander McNaughtan (merchant), had left Scotland for Australia before the family moved to Heatherbank, however after the death of his wife he returned to the new family home. It is hypothesised by art researcher Stephen Scheding in his book "The National Picture" that Alexander McNaughtan may have been the last owner of Benjamin Duterrau's lost masterpiece, a large scale version of "The Conciliation". Scheding believed it was taken by Alexander McNaughtan to Heatherbank in 1869 however the picture has not been found. The painting depicts the conciliation of Tasmanian Aborigines by George Augustus Robinson. Scheding's visit to the house to search for the painting was well documented in local newspapers at the time.

After the death of the final McNaughtan daughter in 1904 the house passed into the ownership of their nieces Agnes and Margaret Taylor.

=== Later history ===
Heatherbank was purchased by architect Frank Fielden in December 1959 who gained some notoriety in Glasgow for designing the Refectory Building of the University of Glasgow, whilst also being a professor there. In 1975 he sold the property to Colin and Rosemary Harvey who opened the Heatherbank Museum of Social Work on the premises. Heatherbank Press Publisher also operated out of the museum. After their deaths in 1993 the museum was moved to the Glasgow Caledonian University.

== Modern day ==
The house was purchased in 1995 by Peter Mowforth and family. It underwent significant refurbishment works in 2012 which returned many of the period features that had been lost over the years.
