= Alfred Moore (engineer) =

English civil engineer

- Born: c. 1826
- Died: 17 July 1904 (aged 78); Holmleigh, Alderley Edge, Cheshire, England
- Engineering career
- Discipline: Civil
- Institutions: Institution of Civil Engineers (member)
- Projects: Manchester waterworks Loch Katrine and Milngavie waterworks Belfast waterworks Buenos Aires waterworks

Alfred Moore (c. 1826 – 17 July 1904) was an English civil engineer primarily involved in waterworks. He obtained his engineering training under John Frederick Bateman and worked alongside him for much of his career.

== Career ==
On completing his pupillage with Bateman, Moore stayed on as an assistant. He was a Resident Engineer on the majority of Bateman's projects.

=== Early works ===
After finishing his training with Bateman he worked as Assistant on the Manchester and Warrington waterworks.

=== Loch Katrine and Mugdock Reservoir ===
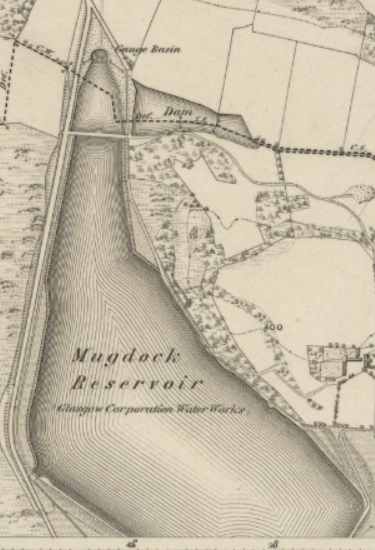
Ordnance Survey Map of 1860 showing completed works on Mugdock Reservoir.

In 1852 Bateman was consulted by Glasgow Council in regard to its water supply. In 1854, on Bateman's advice, a bill was obtained to supply water to Glasgow from Loch Katrine. Moore was appointed alongside the more famous James Morris Gale as Resident Engineer and resided in the nearby house of Heatherbank, Milngavie.

Work on Mugdock Reservoir commenced in 1855. The Loch Katrine end was officially opened by Queen Victoria in October 1859, however Moore continued to work on Mugdock Reservoir until 1865.

The waterworks were extended by adding Craigmaddie Reservoir, however this work was completed solely under the attention of Gale.

Describing the entire waterworks, Gale commented that they were as worthy to "bear comparison with the most extensive aqueducts in the world, not excluding those of ancient Rome".

=== Woodburn Reservoirs (Belfast) ===
Moore was elected a Member of the Institution of Civil Engineers on the 15 May 1866 and in the same year began expansion work on the Belfast waterworks as the Resident Engineer. The original reservoirs were constructed in the 1840s however following the parliamentary Belfast Water Act 1865 (28 & 29 Vict. c. clxxxix) there was a need to expand the works with construction of reservoirs to the North at Woodburn, and increase storage within Belfast. The works were completed in 1870.

=== South America ===
In 1870 he went to Buenos Aires to represent Bateman in connection with the works for the water-supply and drainage of the city. The Buenos Aires waterworks were predominantly designed by John Coghlan, however Moore was resident engineer managing much of the construction. Also while there he constructed the Catalinas Mole. These works occupied him in South America for several years.

=== Later works ===
On returning from South America, he revisited some of his earlier works, extending the water supply at Warrington. He then went on to work under George Henry Hill designing plans for the Thirlmere scheme for the supply of water to Manchester.

Alongside Bateman he helped develop the device known as Bateman and Moore's Firecock, which was adopted in many large cities and towns.

== Death ==
He died suddenly at his residence, Holmleigh, Alderly Edge, on 17 July 1904, aged 78. He had no partner or children.
