= Business Stream =

Scottish water company

Scottish Water Business Stream Limited
- Trade name: Business Stream
- Type: Subsidiary
- Industry: Water industry
- Founded: 29 December 2005; 20 years ago
- Headquarters: Edinburgh, Scotland, UK
- Area served: United Kingdom
- Services: Water supply; Wastewater treatment
- Website: business-stream.co.uk

Scottish Water Business Stream Limited, trading as Business Stream, is a water retail business operating in both Scotland and England's competitive non-domestic water markets, with its headquarters in Edinburgh. It also has offices in Glasgow, Worthing and Bradford. The company is a subsidiary of Scottish Water, the publicly owned utility which serves the residential water market across Scotland.

== Operation in Scotland ==
Having previously supplied all of Scotland's properties with water, Scottish Water split its non-domestic arm off to serve the fledgling market. The newly formed company, called Business Stream, acted as the incumbent non-domestic water and waste water supplier for organisations in the country.

In June 2020, Business Stream reported that since the market opened in 2008, it had helped its customers save over £272 million through discounts and water and energy efficiencies.

== Operations in England ==
On 8 December 2011, the Department for Environment, Food and Rural Affairs (DEFRA) published the Water for Life market reform proposals, which suggested introducing "a package of reforms" to extend competition in England's non-residential water market. The proposals anticipated legislation being introduced the following year.

In view of potential competition changes, Business Stream registered for a licence to compete in the English market, as reported in The Sunday Times, in 2009. It has since stated that it has secured contracts with Network Rail, Cancer Research UK, Lloyds Banking Group and the Ministry of Justice.
