= James Morris Gale =

Scottish civil engineer

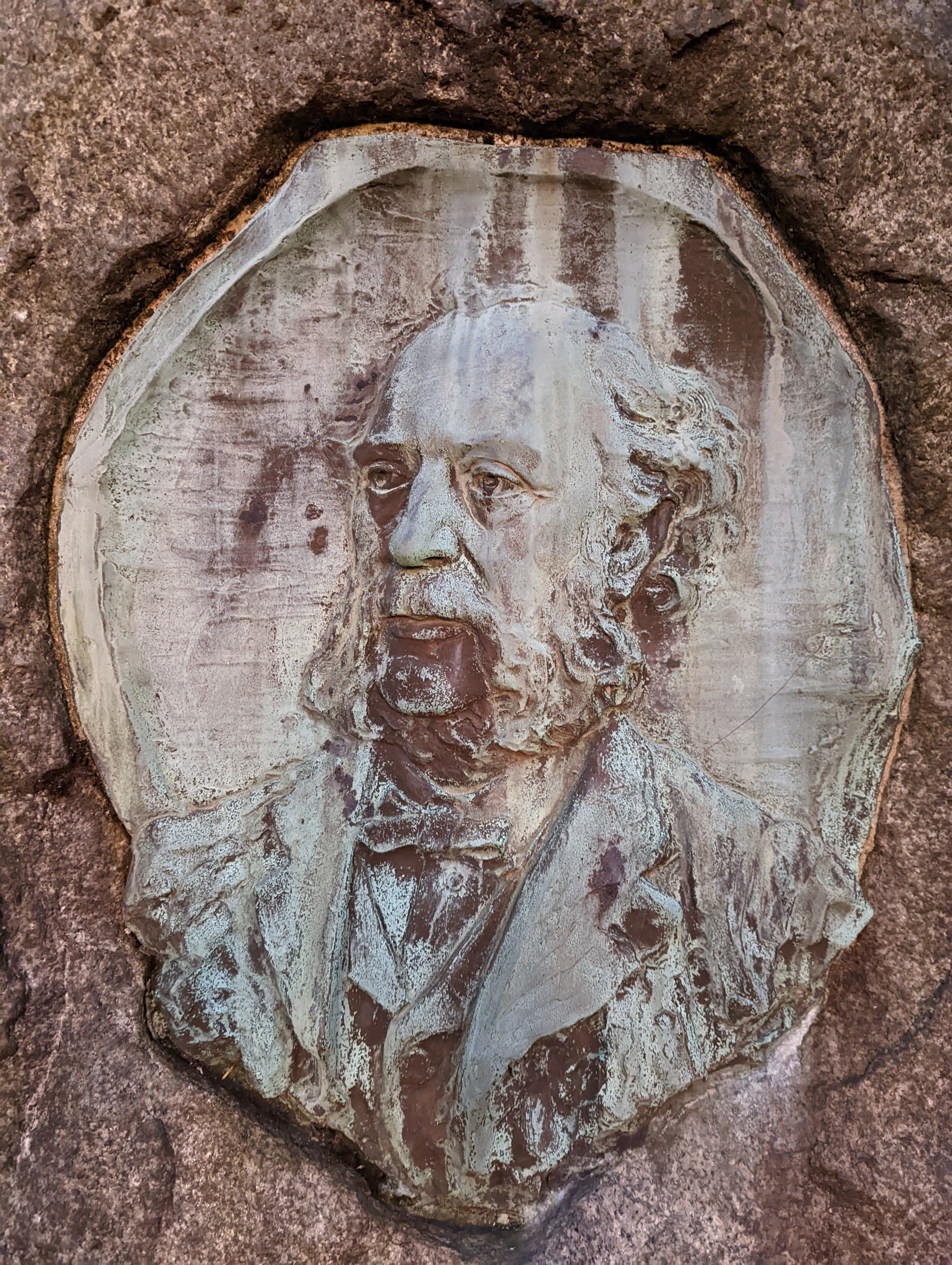
- Born: 1830; Ayr
- Died: 7 September 1903 (aged 73); Aberfoyle, Stirling
- Education: Ayr Academy; University of Glasgow
- Spouse: Mary Ann Morris Gale
- Children: William Morris Gale; George Henderson Gale; Isabella Mary Gale
- Engineering career
- Discipline: Civil; Hyrdaulic
- Institutions: Institution of Engineers and Shipbuilders in Scotland (President); Institution of Civil Engineers (Member)
- Projects: Loch Katrine and Milngavie waterworks

James Morris Gale M. Inst. C.E. (1830 - 7 September 1903) was a Scottish civil engineer for the Glasgow Corporation Waterworks. He is most famous for his work building the Milngavie water treatment works. The project directed water from Loch Katrine, 36 miles (58 km) to the north, which required the building of an aqueduct to carry the water to the city of Glasgow by gravity.

He became a member of the Institution of Civil Engineers on 2 February 1864.

He was a life member of the Institution of Engineers and Shipbuilders in Scotland and was president from 1867 to 1869.

== Life and career ==
Born in Ayr in 1830, Gale was educated at the local Ayr Academy. At the age of 14 he moved to Glasgow and worked under his brother, William Gale, who was engineer to the Gorbals Water Company.

To extend his knowledge of engineering he attended the University of Glasgow, and studied under William Rankine.

=== Gorbals Water Works ===
While in the office of his brother he was employed in the design and in supervising the construction of the Gorbals Water Works. In 1854 Gale was assumed a partner by his brother and entrusted with the construction of the Balgarry reservoir, the largest of the reservoirs connected with Gorbals works. At the same time Gale drafted plans for the proposed enlargement of these works, which were considered an alternative scheme to the Loch Katrine project, then receiving attention.

=== Loch Katrine, Mugdock and Craigmaddie Reservoirs ===
In 1852 John Frederick Bateman was consulted by Glasgow Council in regard to its water supply. In 1854, on Bateman's advice, a bill was obtained to supply water to Glasgow from Loch Katrine. Gale was appointed as Resident Engineer on the city section of the scheme under Bateman, by whom it was designed and carried out. Bateman's assistant engineer, Alfred Moore, also became Resident Engineer.

Work commenced in 1855. The aqueduct is divided into two parts. The first is 41.5 kilometres (25.7 miles) long, between Loch Katrine and Mugdock Reservoir, on the outskirts of Milngavie. The second part is a 13 km (8 miles) aqueduct of twin cast iron pipes from the reservoir into Glasgow. The 2.4m diameter subterranean tunnels are unlined and have been constructed to a flat gradient of 158mm per km (about 10 inches per mile). In 1859 the first stage of the works were completed. This included the first semicircular gauge basin in Mugdock Reservoir. It was opened by Queen Victoria on 14 October 1859 by opening a sluice near the centre of the south bank of Loch Katrine. Water began flowing into Glasgow on 28 December 1859. The works up to this point cost £1,330,000. Gale was then appointed chief engineer of the Glasgow Corporation Waterworks and took entire charge of the project.

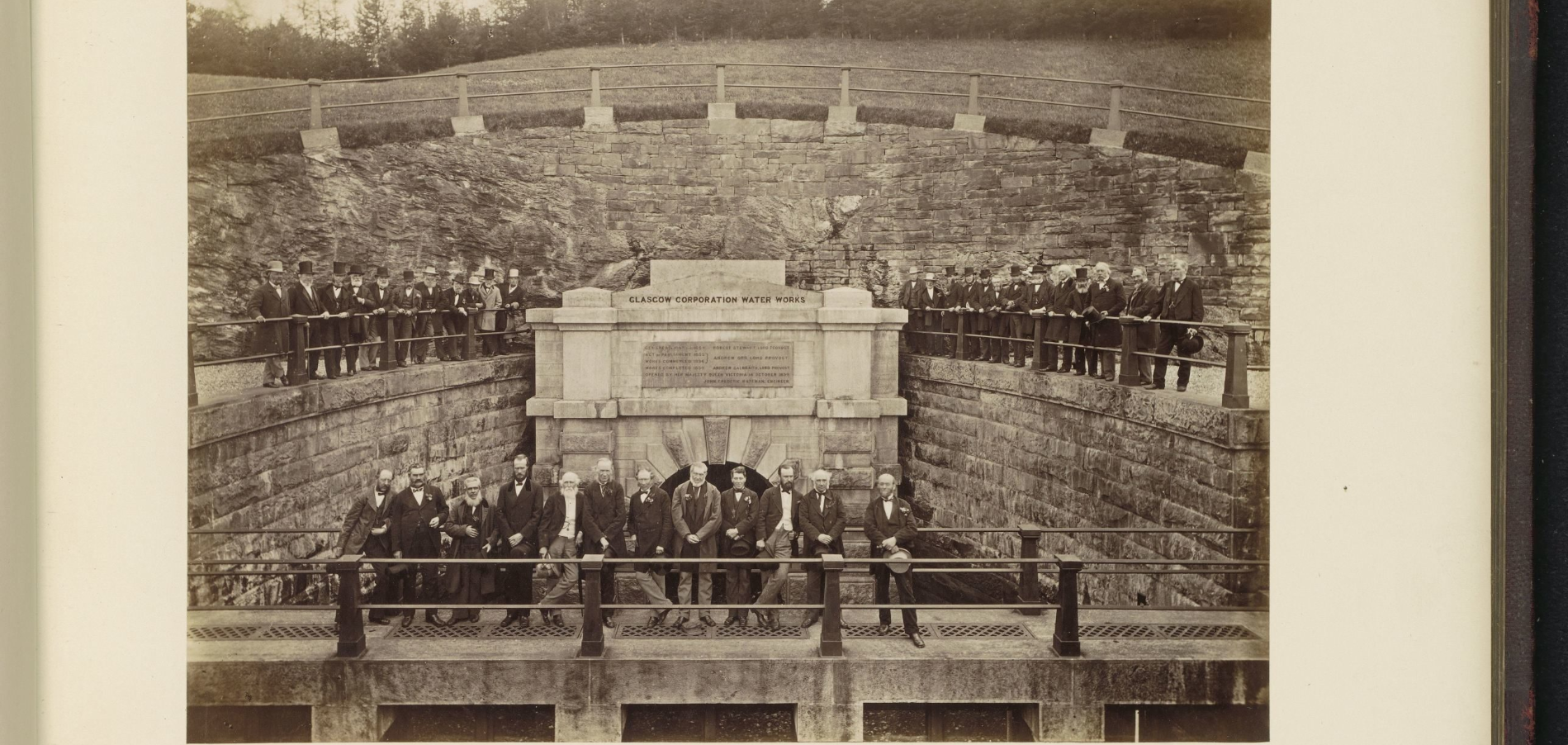
James Gale pictured alongside members of the Water Committee, 24 August 1876

Gale contributed to Thomas Annan's "Photographic views of Loch Katrine, and some of the principal works constructed for introducing the water of Loch Katrine to the city of Glasgow" (1877), providing descriptive notes to Annan's photographs.

At the end of 1881 Glasgow had increased in population so greatly that it became apparent a larger supply of water than the aqueduct could convey from Loch Katrine would be required within a few years. Accordingly an act was obtained in 1882 for the construction of an additional service reservoir adjoining the Mugdock reservoir, to be named Craigmaddie Reservoir. In 1885 a further act was obtained which gave power to duplicate the aqueduct, to raise the level of the water in Loch Katrine 5 feet higher, and to convert Loch Arklet into a reservoir by raising its water level 25 feet. Gale designed and led the new works.

The Craigmaddie service reservoir, adjoining the Mugdock, was to have a water surface of 86 acres and contain 700 million gallons of water. The two reservoirs together were to contain sufficient water for twelve and a half days' supply at the rate of 100 million gallons per day. The raising of the water level on Loch Katrine and Loch Arklet added an estimated 75 million gallons per day to the supply. Work started on 1 May 1886 and all works were completed by 11 June 1896. The reservoir was brought into operation on the 1 January 1897 after geological problems necessitated the excavation of a deep trench to ensure that it was fully watertight. The total cost of works since 1886 was nearly £1,500,000.

Describing the entire waterworks, Gale commented that they were as worthy to "bear comparison with the most extensive aqueducts in the world, not excluding those of ancient Rome".

== Death and commemoration ==
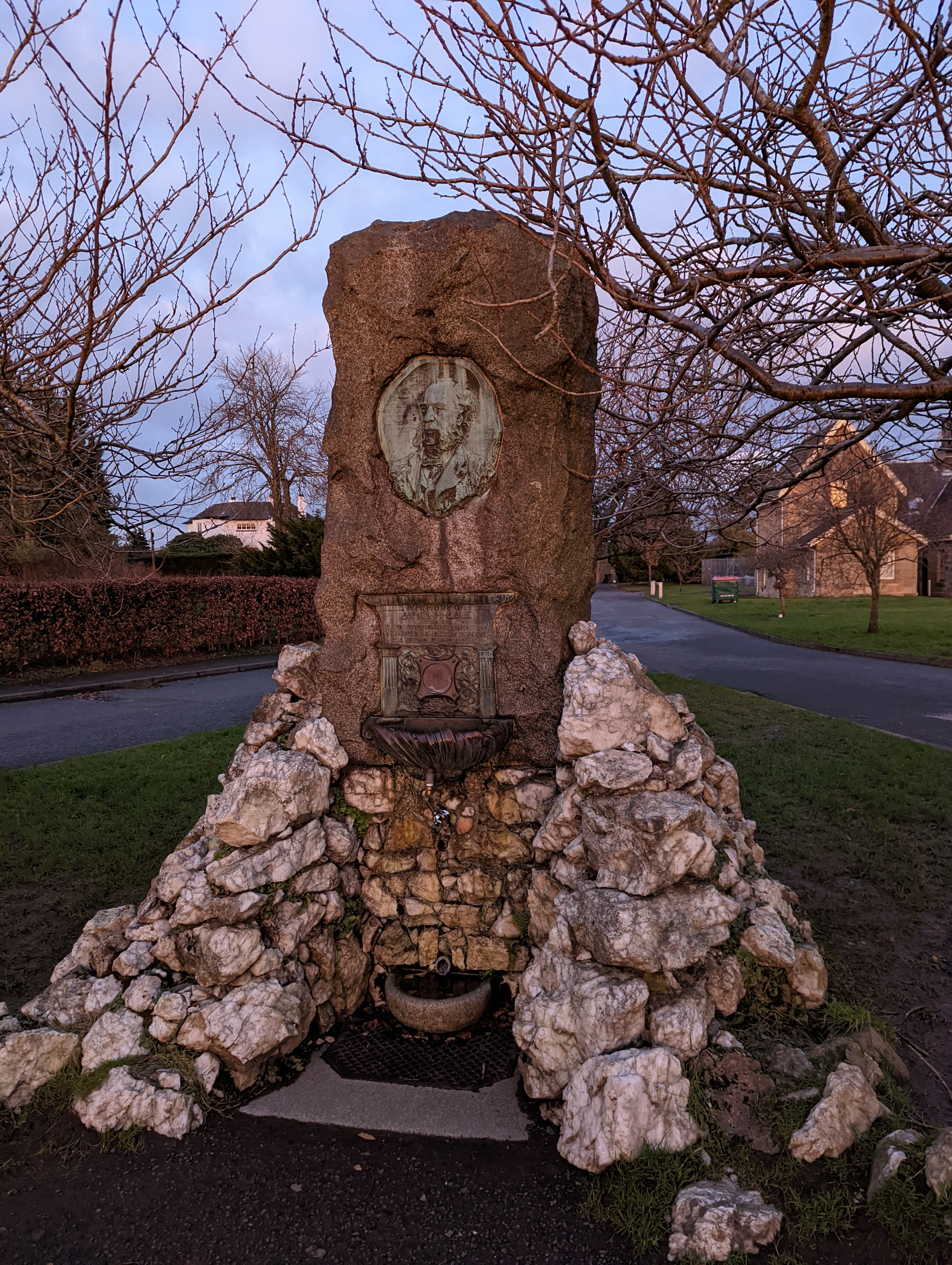
Memorial fountain to James M Gale at the Milngavie water treatment works

Gale retired from his post in the Glasgow Corporation Waterworks at the end of 1902. He died on 7 September 1903, aged 73, at his home in Aberfoyle.

A memorial to him was placed in the Glasgow Necropolis.

In 1904, the employees of the Glasgow Corporation Waterworks erected a memorial water fountain in his honour. The Art Nouveau style monument features a bronze plaque with a profile of Gale, embedded into a roughly hewn block of granite. Supporting the block is a cairn style base of rubble masonry.
