= Alexander McNaughtan =

Scottish/Australian Merchant

- Born: 28 November 1815; Milngavie, Dunbartonshire, Scotland
- Died: 6 August 1884 (aged 68); Heatherbank, Milngavie, Dunbartonshire, Scotland
- Known for: Merchant; Businessman; Philanthropist
- Spouse: Margaret Kerr (m. 1847)

Alexander McNaughtan (28 November 1815 – 6 August 1884) was a Scottish born merchant and businessman who emigrated to Van Diemen's Land (now Tasmania, Australia) in 1842. He produced a report for the Royal Society of Van Diemen's Land on combustible mineral substance from the Mersey River.

== Life and career ==
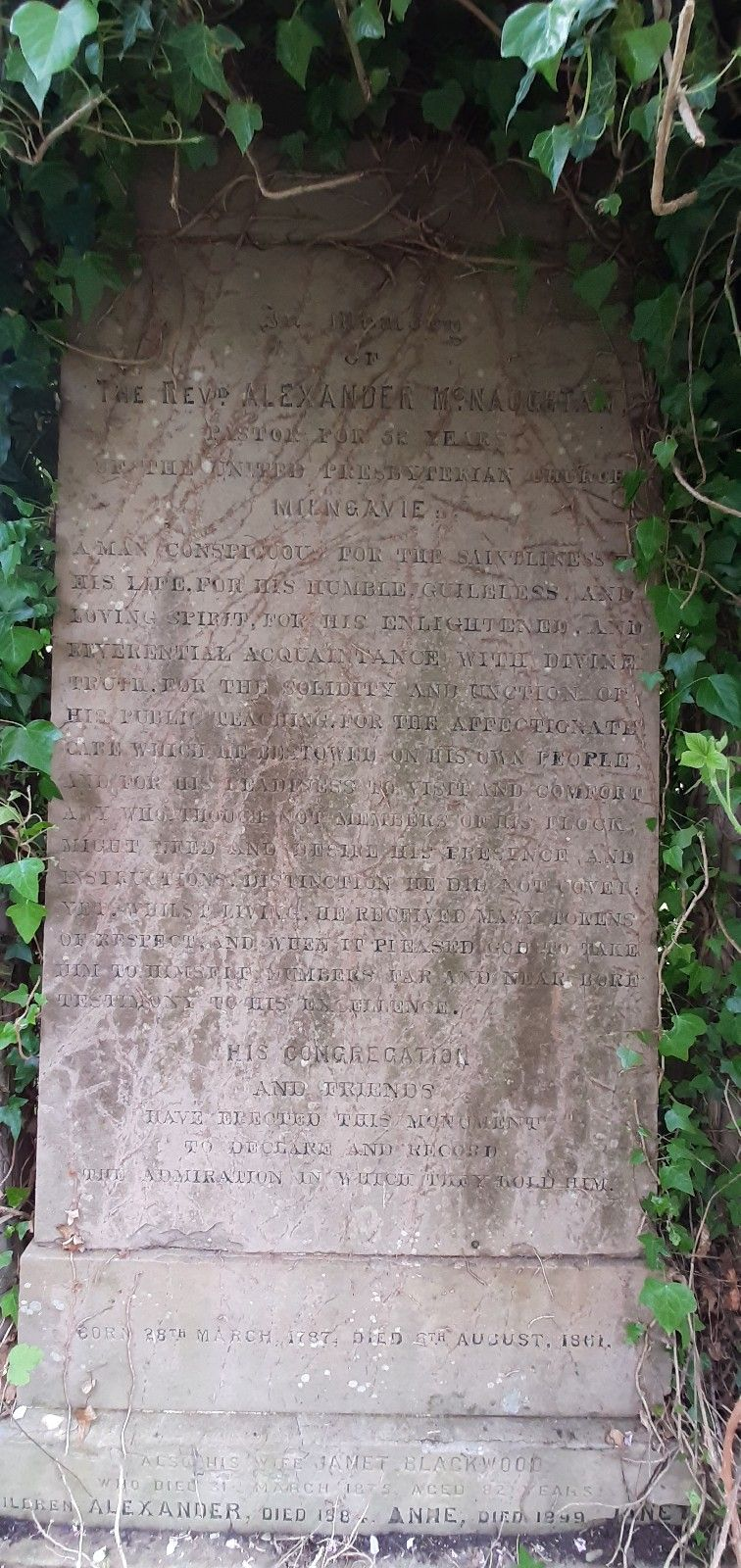
McNaughtan gravestone at New Kilpatrick Church

McNaughtan was born on the 28 November 1815 in Milngavie, Dunbartonshire, Scotland to Alexander McNaughtan, the local Presbyterian minister, and Janet, née Blackwood, of the Craigallion/Craigton bleaching family. He was Christened at New Kilpatrick (now Bearsden) on 17 December 1815.

He married his former boss's sister, Margaret Kerr, on 29 March 1849. The service was conducted by John Lillie at St. Andrew’s Presbyterian Church in Hobart.

He returned to Hobart and lived with his wife until her death on 20 December 1868. On 12 January 1869 he sold his property before returning to Scotland.

McNaughtan died of heart disease at the family home of Heatherbank on 6 August 1884. He was buried under his father's headstone at the New Kilpatrick church alongside others in his family.

It is hypothesised by art researcher Stephen Scheding in his book The National Picture that McNaughtan may have been the last owner of Benjamin Duterrau's lost masterpiece, a large scale version of "The Conciliation". Scheding believed it was taken by McNaughtan to his family home of Heatherbank in 1869 however the picture has not been found.
