= Heatherbank Museum of Social Work =

The Heatherbank Museum of Social Work is part of the Glasgow Caledonian University in Scotland, and is believed to be the only museum dedicated to social work.

The museum was founded in the early Victorian house of Heatherbank, Milngavie in 1975 by Colin and Rosemary Harvey. Heatherbank Press Publisher also operated out of the museum while at Heatherbank.

After their deaths in 1993 the museum was moved to the Glasgow Caledonian University. In 2004 there ceased to be a physical museum at the university, however the works were subsumed into the Glasgow Caledonian University and is part of the university's research collection.

The material in the collection contains documents relating to poorhouses; administration of poor law; former hospitals and institutions; and former prisoner support agencies. It also holds the archive of the Association of Directors of Social Work (ADSW).
