= 2002 Glasgow floods =

Series of flash floods in Glasgow

The 2002 Glasgow Floods were a series of flash floods that occurred after thunderstorms in the Scottish Lowlands in the end of July and beginning of August 2002. The heaviest rainfall fell on the night of 30 July 2002.

The East End of Glasgow was the worst affected district of the city, and two hundred people were evacuated from their homes in Greenfield and Shettleston on the Tuesday night. The antiquated 19th century storm drain and sewer system in that area, having received minimal investment from Scottish Water, was blamed due to its inability to deal with the high capacity of surface runoff. Many of the homes affected were in working class areas, and as a result, did not have contents insurance.

The West Coast Main Line, Glasgow to Edinburgh via Carstairs Line and Queen Street Station were closed as a result of flooding and landslides. A number of roads were also badly affected by flooding in Sighthill, Springburn as well as the main A82 and A8 Roads. Buchanan Street Subway Station on the Glasgow Subway was closed, although trains continued to run through the station without stopping.

Parts of the Argyle Line were also flooded, with low level stations from Dalmarnock through to Exhibition Centre closed for a number of weeks. The water parasite cryptosporidium was discovered in Mugdock Reservoir at Milngavie Water Treatment Works on 4 August 2002, as a result of the flooding. Cryptosporidium can cause severe diarrhoea. About 140,000 people in Glasgow were affected, and were told not to drink tap water without boiling it first. This later led to a major redevelopment of the water treatment works.

== See also ==
- 2002 European floods
