= Milngavie water treatment works =

Water treatment works in East Dunbartonshire, Scotland

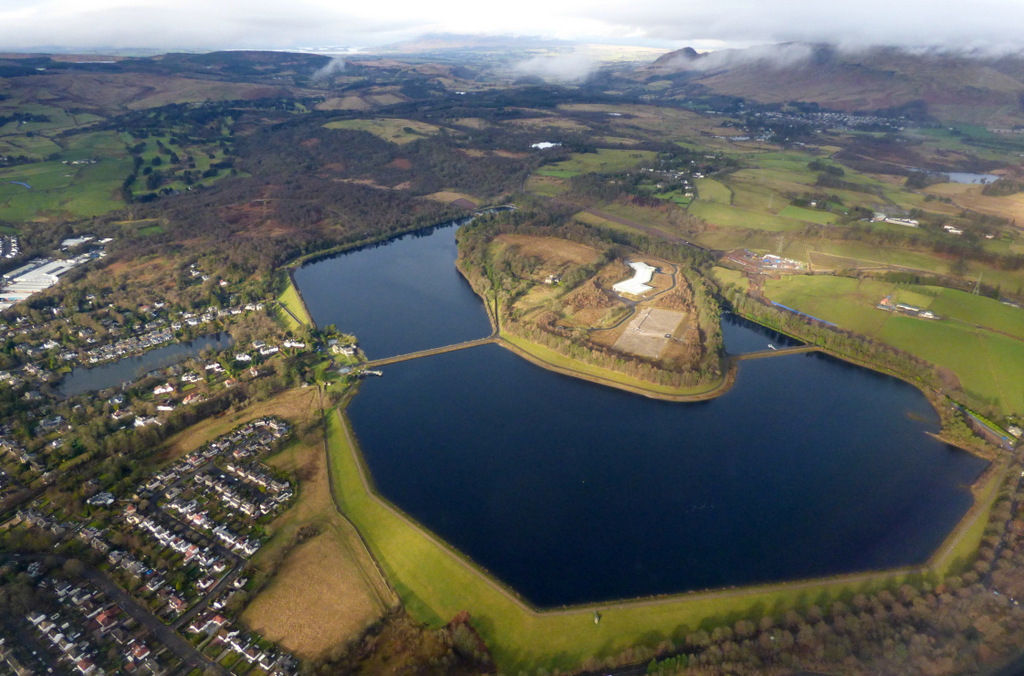
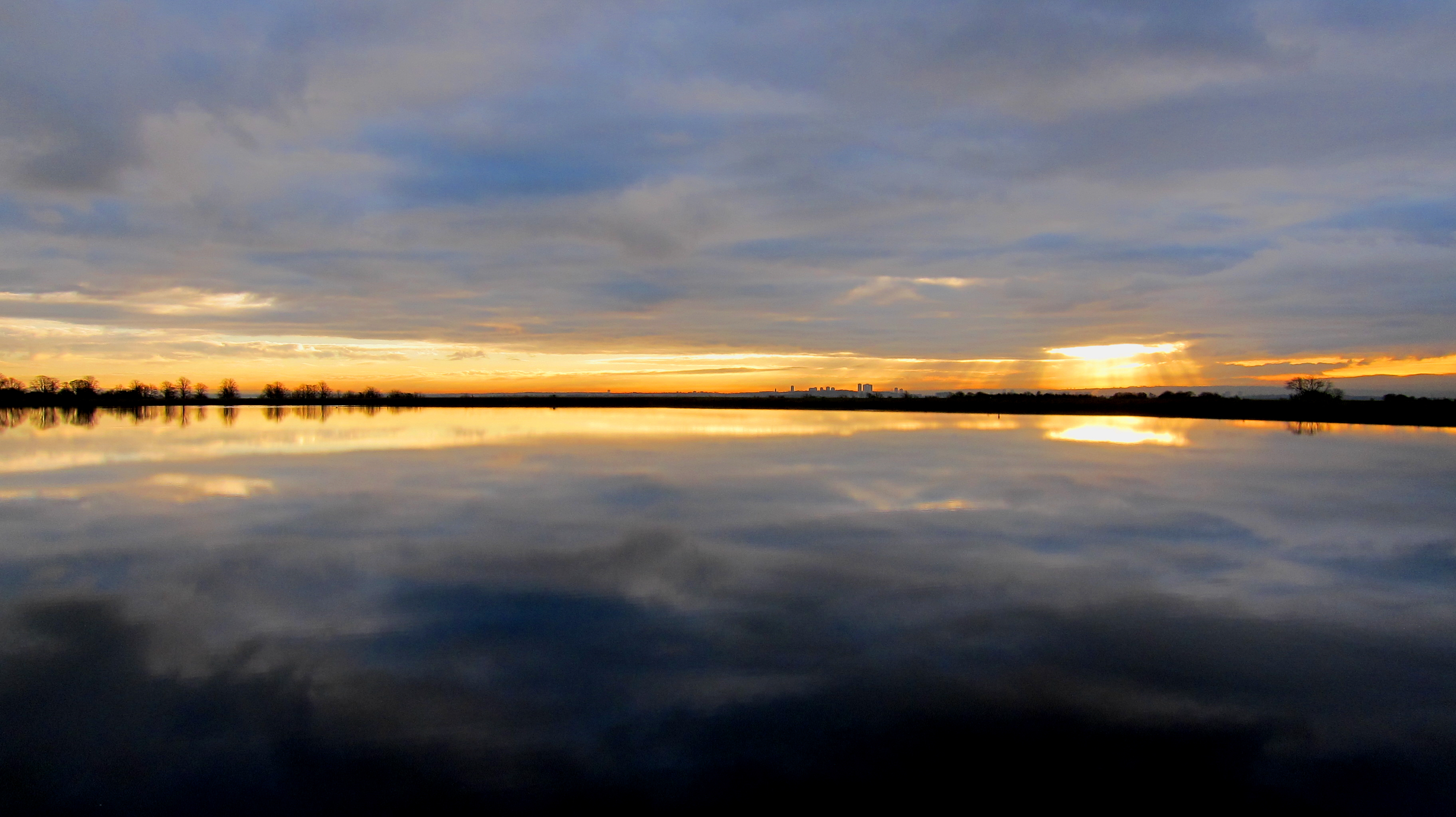
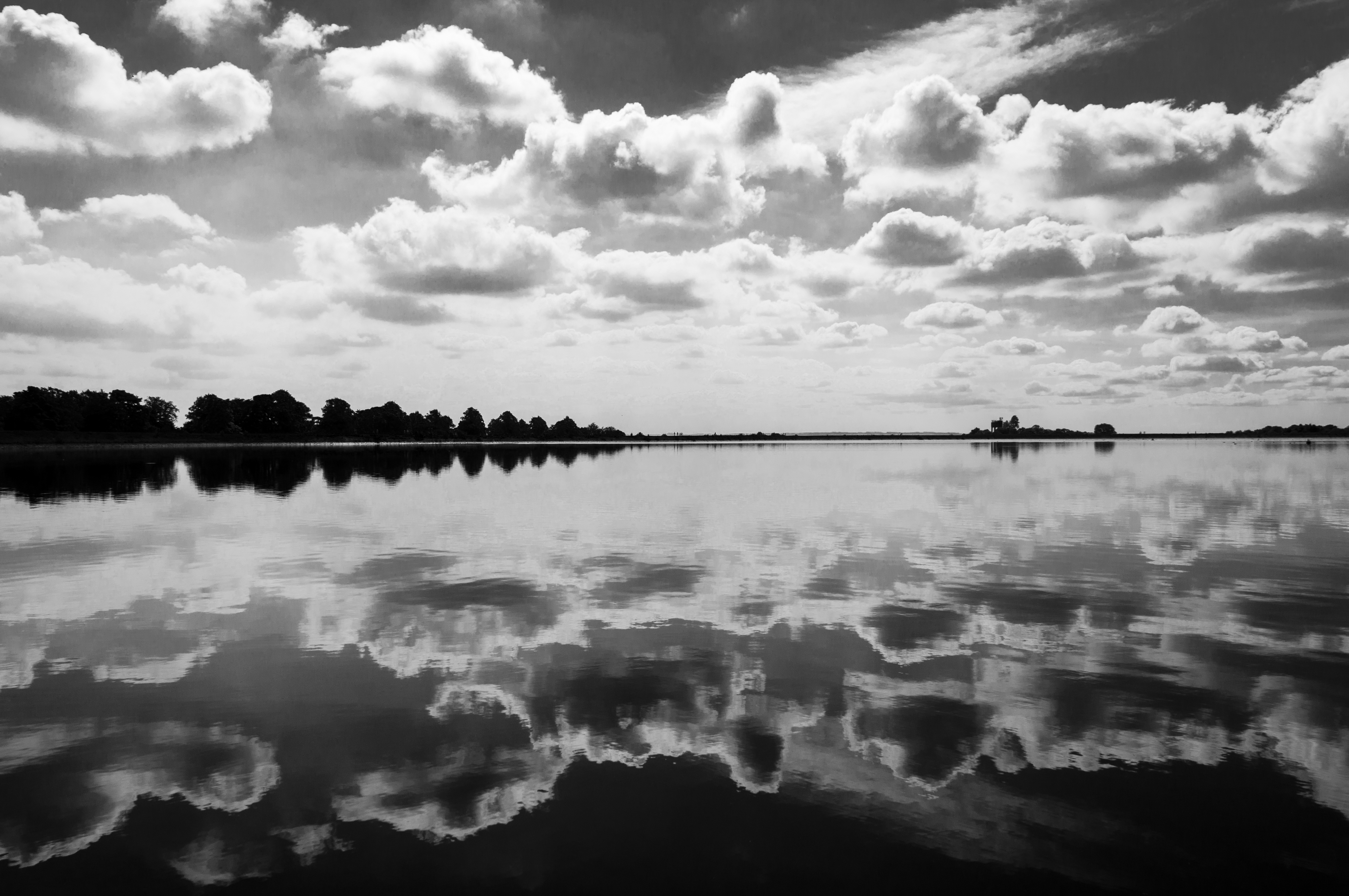
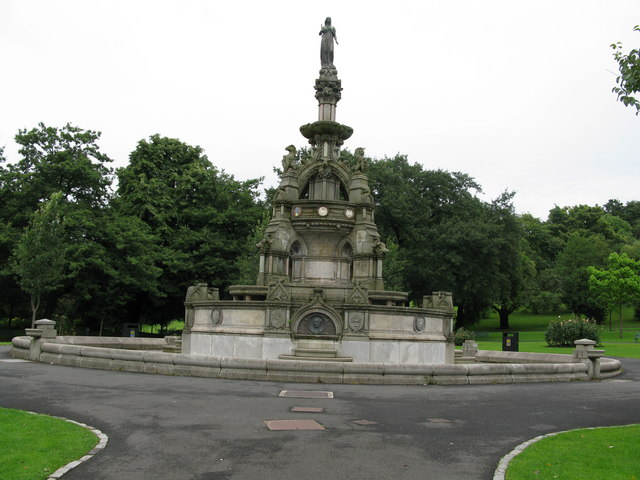
- The Waterworks

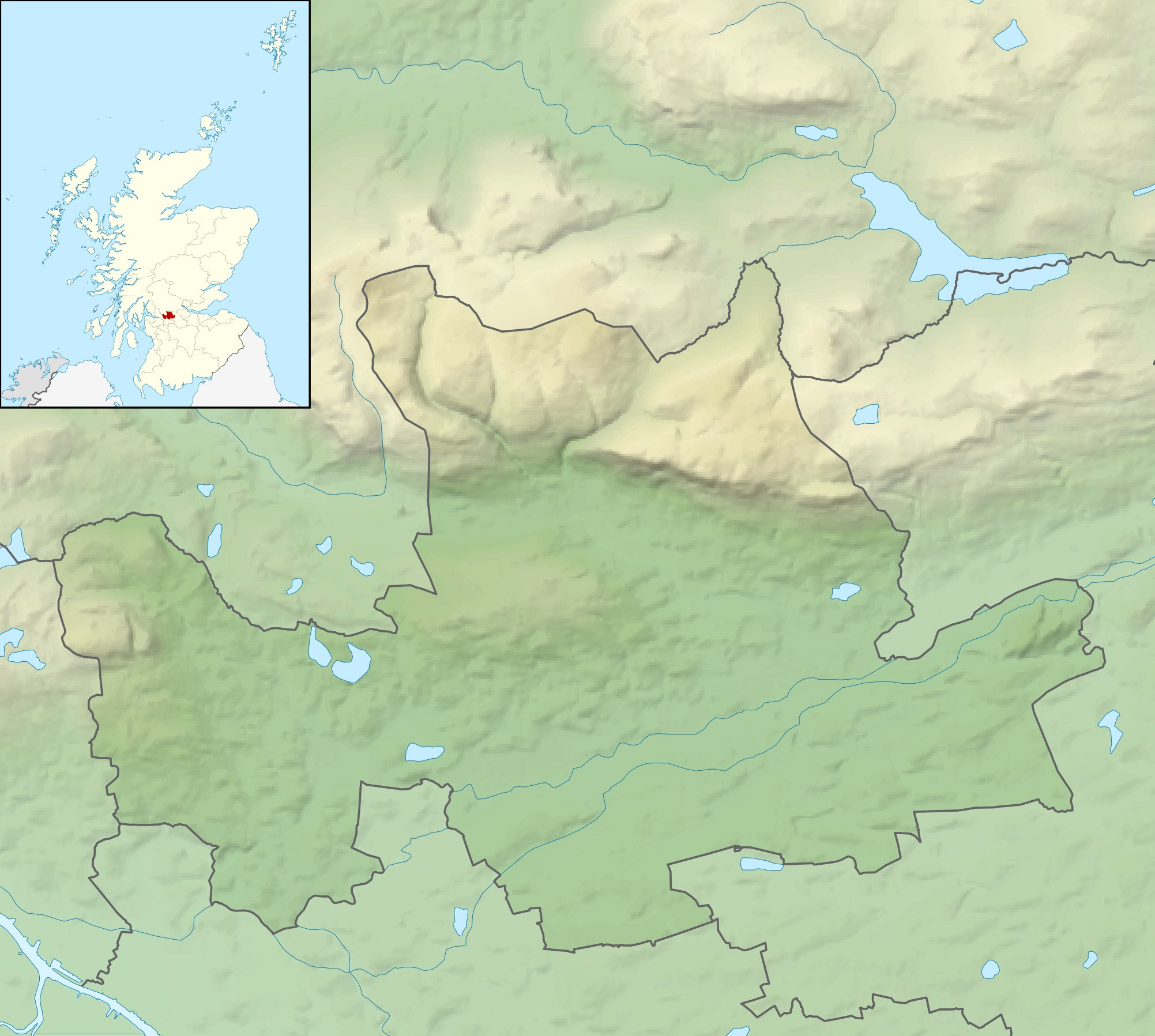
- Location within East Dunbartonshire Location within the United Kingdom
- Location: Milngavie, East Dunbartonshire, Scotland
- Coordinates: 55°57′N 04°18′W
- Type: Reservoir
- Managing agency: Scottish Water
- Built: 1855
- Construction engineer: John Frederick Bateman; James Morris Gale; Alfred Moore

Inventory of Gardens and Designed Landscapes in Scotland
- Official name: Milngavie Reservoirs
- Designated: 6 September 2018
- Reference no.: GDL00408

Milngavie water treatment works (commonly known as The Waterworks) is a Scottish Water-operated water treatment facility located in Milngavie, Scotland. It is the primary source of water for the city of Glasgow (and the Greater Glasgow area) in western Scotland. Part of the Victorian Loch Katrine water project, construction was started in 1855 and the works was opened by Queen Victoria in 1859, replacing the previous water supply sourced from the River Clyde at Cuningar Loop in Dalmarnock.

Its completion led to the virtual eradication of typhoid and cholera from the city; diseases which were widespread at the time. The success of the project was marked by the erection of the Stewart Memorial Fountain in Kelvingrove Park. The works were described by James Morris Gale as worthy to "bear comparison with the most extensive aqueducts in the world, not excluding those of ancient Rome".

The first aqueduct project was built under the guidance of John Frederick Bateman (an example of his engineering prowess that can still be seen working today). A second aqueduct was completed in 1901.

The works are currently operated by Scottish Water and at average demand, it can supply enough potable water to those it serves for up to seven days. Its primary supply is via two aqueducts from Loch Katrine in the north, that are 56 km (32 miles) in length, and can deliver up to 50,000,000 imperial gallons (230,000,000 L; 60,000,000 US gal) a day. Milngavie itself is situated at almost 120 m (400 ft) above sea level – sufficient to provide adequate water pressure to the majority of Glasgow without the need for pumping. The Milngavie reservoirs distribute water to secondary reservoirs, such as Cockmuir Reservoir in Springburn Park, and various water towers throughout the city.

The reservoirs are a common attraction for walkers, cyclists and photographers, who take advantage of the peripheral walkways that verge on Mugdock Country Park, and offer views over the Glasgow area.

== Reservoirs ==
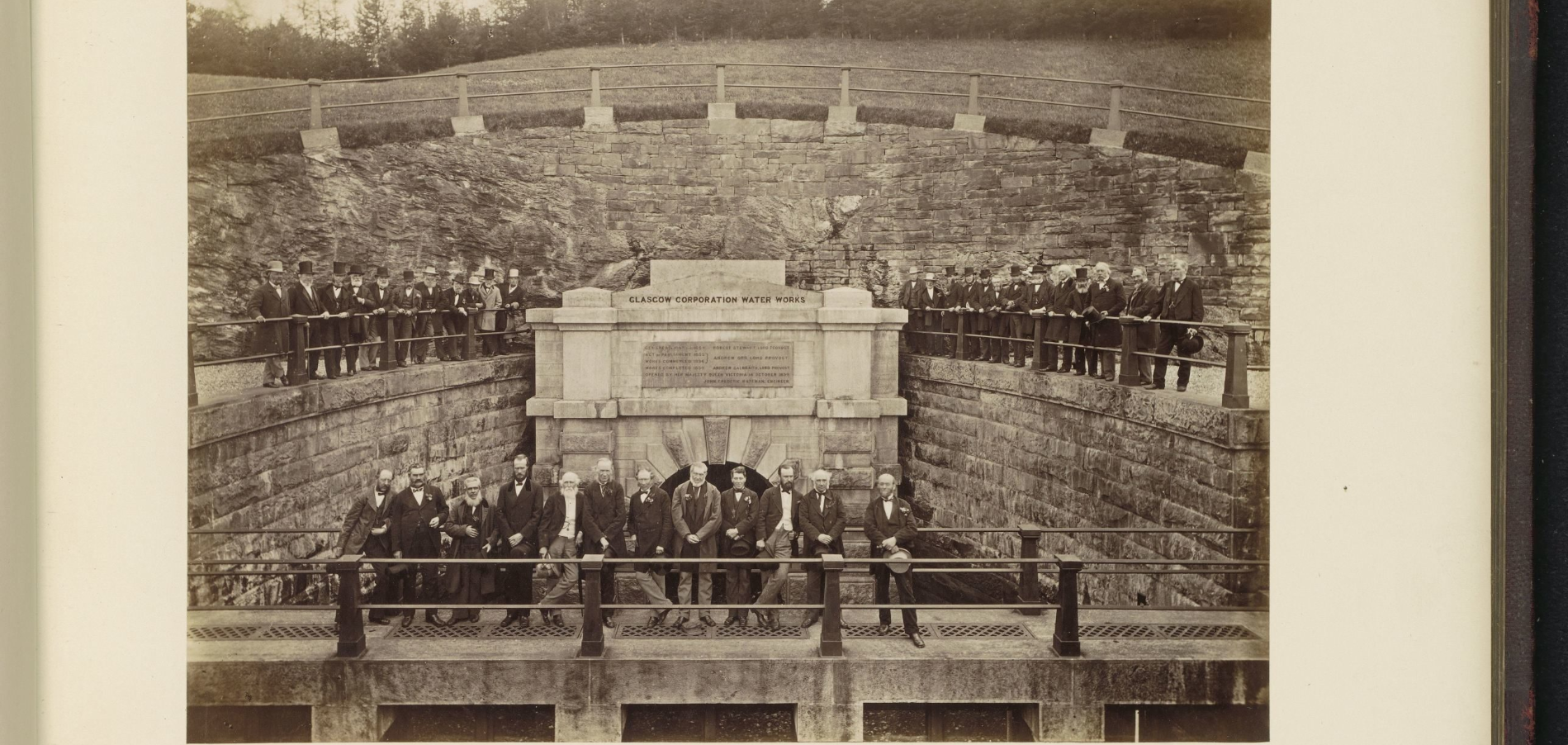
Members of the water committee of the Glasgow Corporation Waterworks for a tunnel to Loch Katrine.

Milngavie water treatment works has three reservoirs, Craigmaddie Reservoir to the East, Mugdock Reservoir to the West, and Bankell Reservoir is situated to the North of Craigmaddie Reservoir. During the assembly of the new water treatment facilities, both the Mugdock and Craigmaddie reservoirs were drained in 2005 and 2006 respectively to facilitate the laying of pipes to and from the plant, and the resultant scene from Craigmaddie reservoir can be seen above. Special consideration had to be taken for the draining of the reservoirs, as they had never been drained in 150 years of operation.

=== Mugdock Reservoir ===
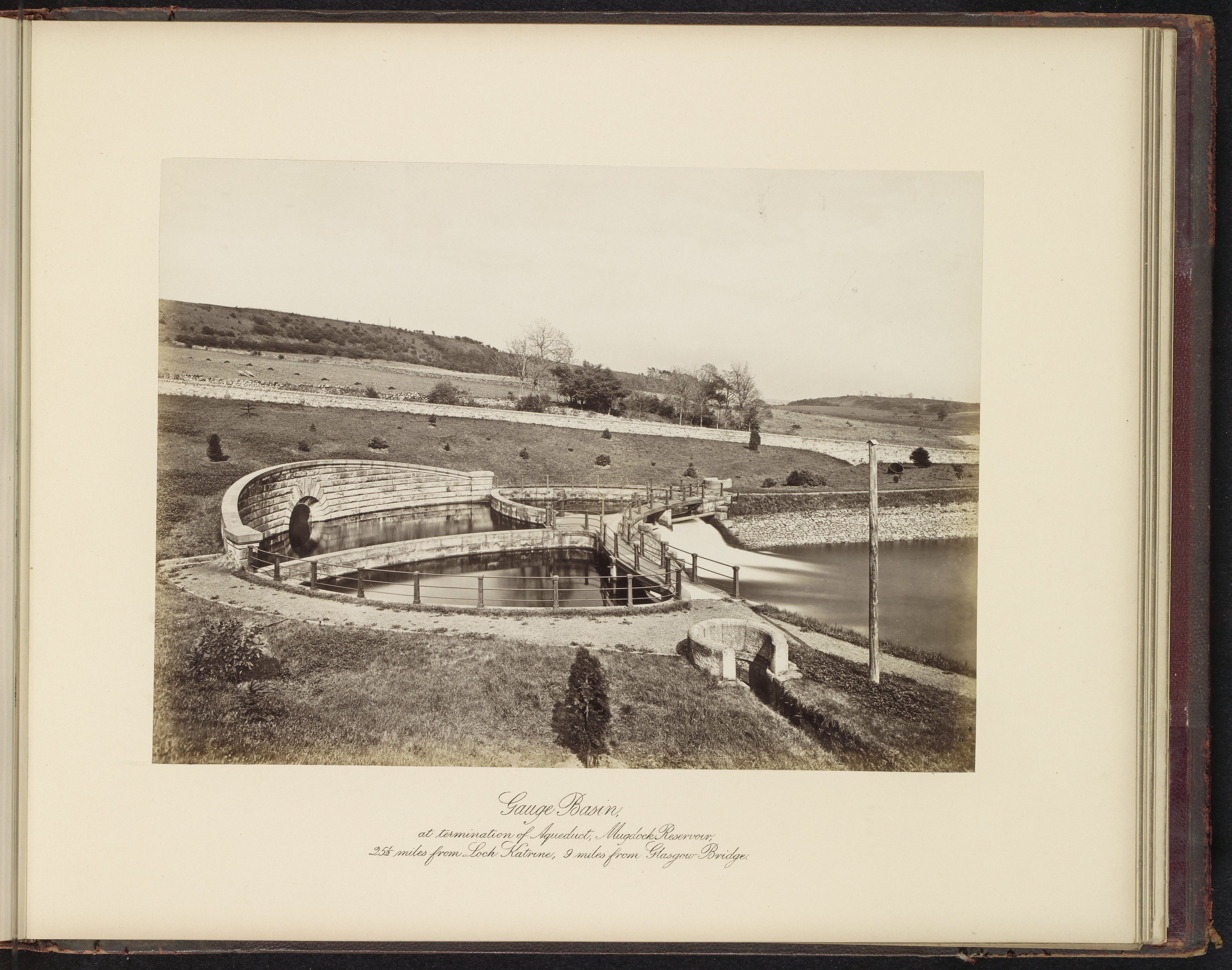
Mugdock Reservoir 1879

Mugdock Reservoir was initially built and opened in the 1850s. Alfred Moore was the Resident Engineer.

=== Craigmaddie Reservoir ===
The Craigmaddie service reservoir was built and opened in 1896 to cater for increased demand. Works were led under James Morris Gale.

=== Bankell Reservoir ===
The new, third, reservoir is named Bankell Reservoir, and went into operation on 26 May 2006. Holding 20,000,000 imperial gallons (91,000,000 L; 24,000,000 US gal), the Bankell Reservoir is 80% underground to minimise ecological impact. It is one of the largest treated water holding tanks in the world.

The new reservoir and treatment works were developed in the wake of the discovery of the waterborne cryptosporidium parasite in Mugdock Reservoir on 4 August 2002, as a result of the 2002 Glasgow floods. Cryptosporidium can cause severe diarrhoea. About 140,000 people in Glasgow were affected – they were told not to drink tap water without boiling it first.

== Security controversy ==
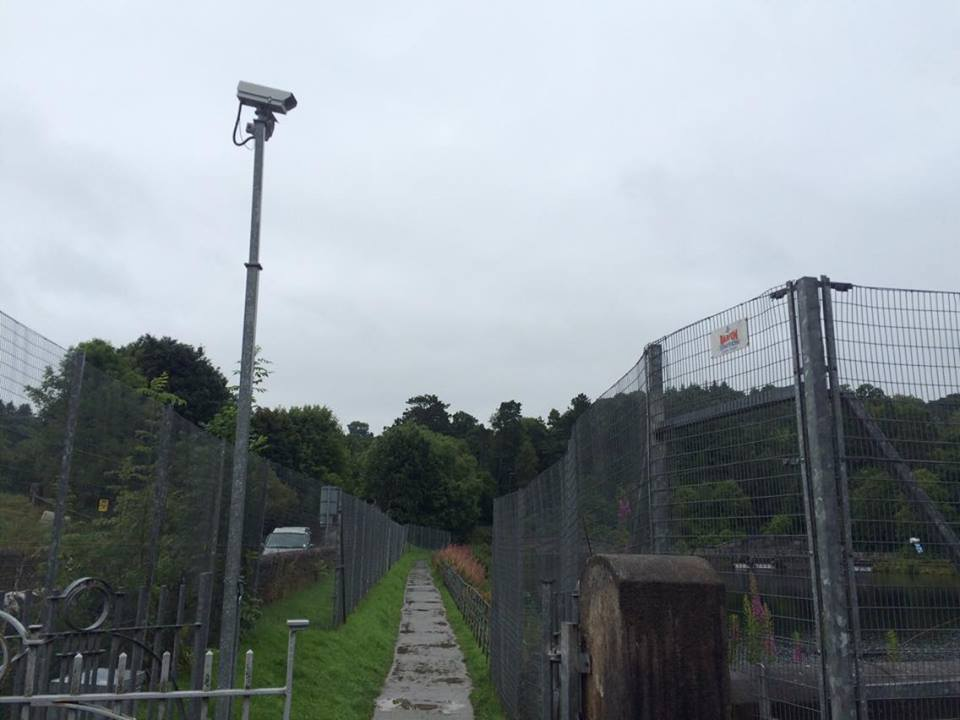
Security precautions at Mugdock Reservoir (2016)

In the early 2000s, security at the facility was tightened with large metal screens being erected around areas of both Mugdock and Craigmaddie Reservoirs, believed to be an action taken in line with the Ministry of Defence's security policy after the September 11 attacks. The fences and security cameras remained in place for many years, which led to public annoyance at the unnecessary and impractical screens. Councillor Duncan Cumming, who chaired the conservation group representing the community during construction of the new treatment plant, said: "The erection of the ugly, high, metal fencing around parts of the reservoir was a knee-jerk reaction by the Ministry of Defence to the 9/11 terrorist attacked in the United States".

In 2010, Member of Parliament Jo Swinson raised awareness of the issue in the House of Commons, saying: "but these so-called security fences around Milngavie reservoir cover only a tiny part of the three-mile perimeter, and as the rest is completely open to the public they serve no practical purpose other than being an eyesore spoiling a beautiful and popular local attraction".

In 2014, the majority of the existing security fences were removed from the facility, and the large sections of land previously fenced off are now accessible to the public.

== Statistics ==
- Officially opened: 14 October 1859
- Capacity: 2.5 gigalitres (88,000,000 cu ft)

Bankell is a service reservoir holding potable water i.e. treated and chlorinated which is fit for human consumption. Mugdock and Craigmaddie are reservoirs holding raw untreated water.
