= SS Shieldhall =

1955 steamship

Coordinates: 50°54′29″N 1°26′31″W

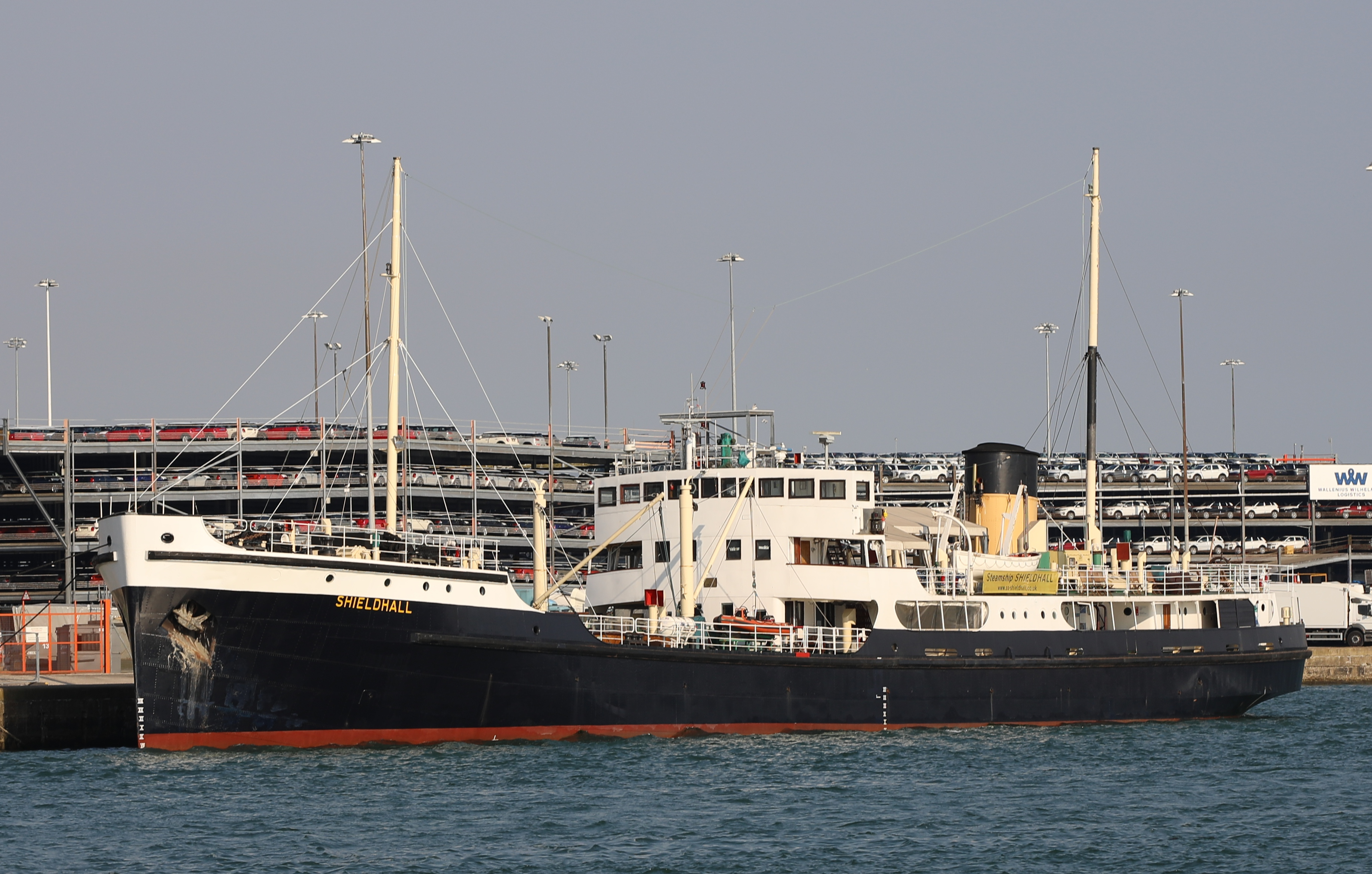
- Shieldhall in Southampton, 2018

History
- Name: Shieldhall
- Owner: Glasgow Corporation 1955–1976; Southern Water Authority 1977–1985; The Solent Steam Packet Ltd 1988
- Port of registry: (United Kingdom) Glasgow
- Builder: Lobnitz & Co., Renfrew, Scotland
- Cost: £291,000
- Yard number: 1132
- Laid down: October 1954
- Launched: 7 July 1955
- Completed: October 1955
- In service: 16 October 1955
- Identification: British Official Number: 185030; IMO number: 5322752
- Fate: Preserved as Museum ship
- Status: In service

General characteristics
- Tonnage: 1,792 GT
- Length: 81.69 m (268 ft 0 in)
- Beam: 13.56 m (44 ft 6 in)
- Draught: 4.11 m (13 ft 6 in)
- Installed power: 2 triple-expansion steam engines of 800 IHP each
- Propulsion: Twin screw
- Speed: Service: 9 knots (17 km/h; 10 mph); Maximum: 13 knots (24 km/h; 15 mph)
- Capacity: 1800 tons of sludge and 80 passengers
- Crew: 12

SS Shieldhall is a preserved steamship that operates from Southampton. She is the largest operational historic steamship in Europe and one of the last reciprocating steam engined ships built, using technology that dated back to the last quarter of the 19th century and which was obsolete at the time of her construction. She spent her working life as one of the "Clyde sludge boats", making regular trips from Shieldhall in Glasgow, Scotland, down the River Clyde and Firth of Clyde past the Isle of Arran, to dump treated sewage sludge at sea. These steamships had a tradition, dating back to the First World War, of taking organised parties of passengers on their trips during the summer. SS Shieldhall has been preserved and offers cruises to the paying public.

== History ==
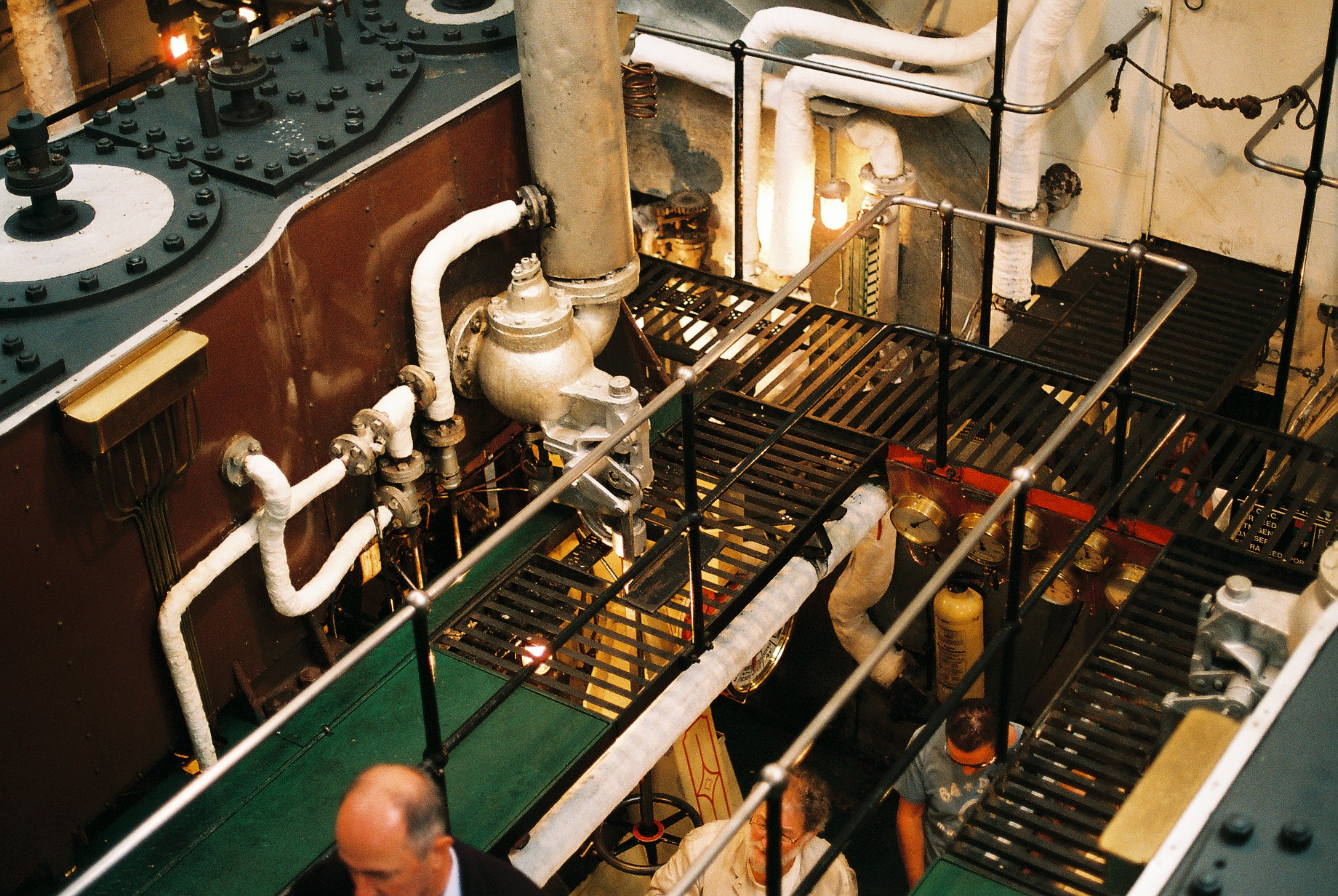
Passengers can go down into the engine room between the two steam engines.

The 1,972-ton Shieldhall was laid down in October 1954, built by Lobnitz & Co. of Renfrew for the municipal Glasgow Corporation. She was the fourth 'sludge boat' built for the Corporation to carry treated sewage from the Corporation's three treatment works (at Dalmarnock, Dalmuir and Shieldhall) to the outer parts of the Firth of Clyde for disposal at sea, and replaced an older ship of the same name (the second of the fleet to be built, in 1910).

Aside from their unglamorous and practical part in the final stage of Glasgow's city sewage system, the sludge boats also provided day trips for passengers. This practice had begun during World War I when the Corporation offered the use of its ships to give soldiers recovering from wounds trips at sea along the Clyde, out to the Firth and to off the Isle of Bute. The traditional Clyde paddle steamers that usually served the tourist and tripper market going doon the watter had all been laid-up during the war or requisitioned for naval service, but the Corporation's sludge boats continued their essential work.

In peacetime, Glasgow Corporation continued to carry passengers on its sludge boats. Their primary role - dumping the sludge - meant that they only ran on a single route to the dumping grounds and back, and they lacked the festive appeal of the paddle steamers. But the Corporation made the trips available at little or no cost, since the ships would run regardless. The ships could be booked for free by other municipal services such as hospitals, schools, care homes and trips organised by Corporation workers, and often by charities and welfare organisations. The low fees allowed pensioners and others on low incomes to enjoy a steamer trip that they would otherwise not have been able to afford. As a matter of civic pride and to combat the inevitable impression given by their primary purpose, the Clyde sludge boats were renowned for being maintained to extremely high cosmetic and mechanical standards, and were jocularly known as 'Clyde Banana Boats'. The nickname was simultaneously an ironic euphemism for their role, a nod to their cleanliness and because their livery (light grey hull and a buff funnel with a black top), was similar to the famous Fyffes Line banana boats.

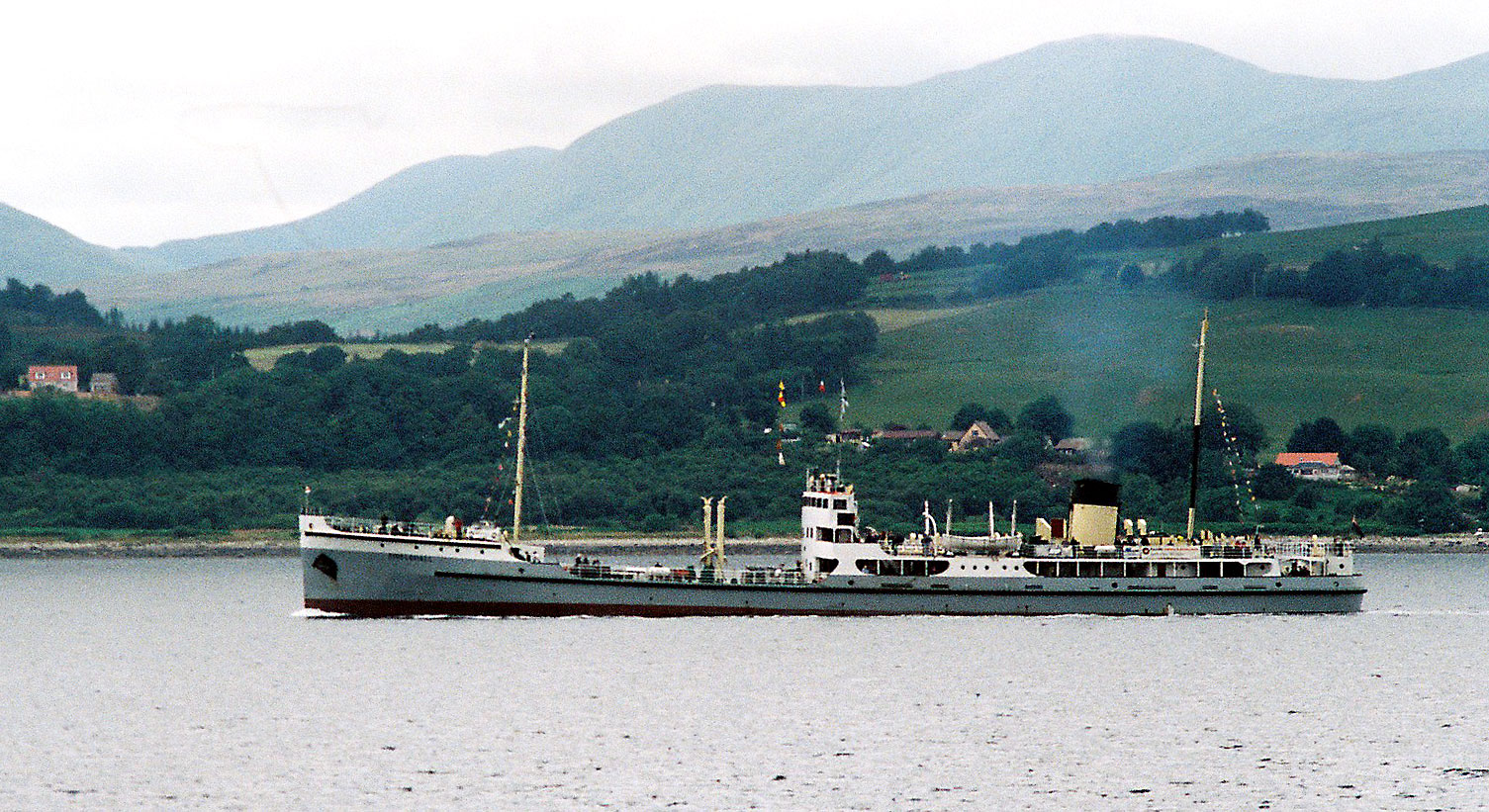
The ship on its route down the River and Firth of Clyde, passing Portkil at the south shore uf the Rosneath Peninsula

The new Shieldhall of 1954 was to continue this tradition. Slightly larger than the older members of the fleet, she was of essentially the same design, with an appearance and mechanical specification familiar to naval architects of the 1890s. She was fitted out to carry 80 passengers as well as 1500 tons of treated sewage. There were open and covered decks with benches for passengers to sightsee, as well as an enclosed saloon. On a typical trip, passengers would be served afternoon tea in the saloon as the ship steamed in a wide circle to dump its cargo, thus avoiding the worst sights and smells before making the return journey.

Like all Clyde sludge boats, Shieldhall is a twin-screw vessel with two triple expansion steam engines. This was to provide extra manoeuvrability negotiating the sinuous River Clyde with its heavy maritime traffic, and to assist coming alongside the wharves at the treatment plants without the need for tugboats.

Another tradition of the sludge boats was that passengers were allowed access to the engine room while the ship was at sea and could view the machinery up close. To this end, special arrangements were made during Shieldhall's construction. By the 1950s Lobnitz usually made its engines with enclosed crankcases and pressure lubrication, but an older design with an open crankcase, exposed working parts and traditional lubrication was used in Shieldhall in order to provide interest for passengers. There are over 20 individual steam engines aboard Shieldhall, fed from a pair of traditional oil-fired Scotch boilers. With two main 800hp reciprocating steam engines, condenser circulating pumps, multiple Weir reciprocating pumps, a reciprocating steering engine, windlass and a dynamo, Shieldhall's engineering is representative of thousands of Victorian and 20th-century steamships, and is often compared to the famous RMS Titanic, just on a much smaller scale.

She was built on the classic lines of a 1920s steam tanker with a traditional midships wheelhouse. The hull was of riveted and welded construction with a slightly raked stem and a cruiser stern. Her length is 268 feet (82 m) and breadth 44 feet 7 inches (13.59 m). Accommodation was provided for 80 passengers.

In 1976 after 21 years of service on the Clyde, Shieldhall was laid up, and in the following year was bought by the Southern Water Authority. Once at Southampton, Shieldhall would take sludge from the areas of Marchwood, Totton and Woolston, then dump the sludge in an area south of the Nab Tower.

Due to rising fuel prices she was withdrawn from service on 5 July 1985. Memos from Southern Water show that while the company was trialling a new ship to take over the Shieldhall's duties, Shieldhall was to be laid up. Once the new ships were proved to be viable for Southern Water, Shieldhall was to be broken up for scrap.

As early as 25 July 1985, discussions opened between Southern Water, The City Council, Associated British Ports and Southampton University Industrial Archeological Society to preserve the Steamship Shieldhall.

== Preservation ==
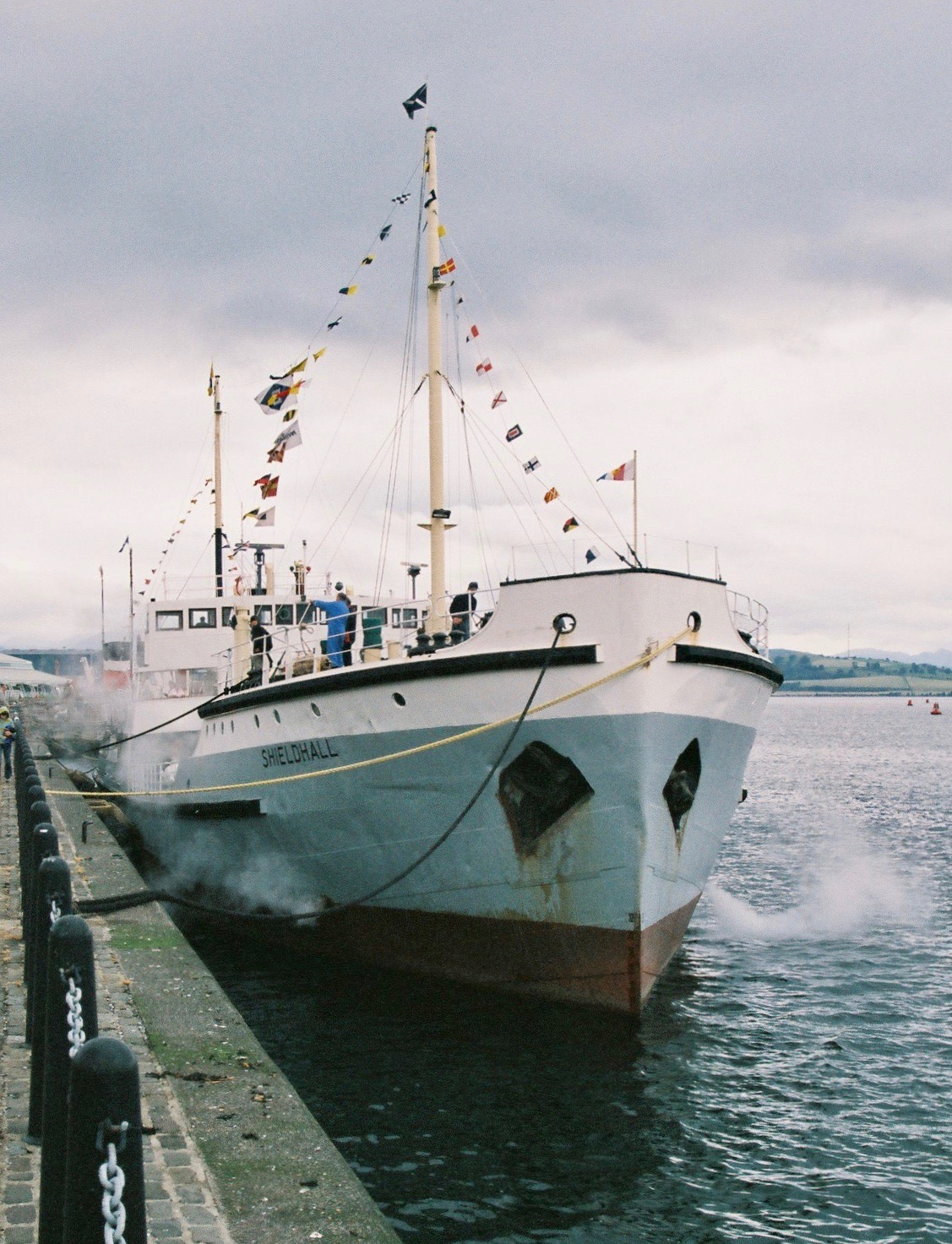
SS Shieldhall moored at Custom House quay, Greenock in 2005.

From 1985 until 1988, while the preservation society raised the money to buy the ship, Shieldhall remained in the custody of Southern Water. Then on 28 July 1988, Shieldhall was handed over to the preservation society, now named The Solent Steam Packet Limited, which operates as a charity.

Shieldhall originally was berthed in Ocean Village, plans were underway at the time for there to be a maritime heritage centre, in which she would be an active working museum. However, the plans for the heritage centre never came to fruition. Shieldhall now docks at Berth 110 in Southamptons Western Docks.

Shieldhall's first voyage in her now preserved state was conducted on 9 June 1991.

All work associated with the Society and Shieldhall was and still is carried out by unpaid volunteers. The remaining Glasgow sludge boats kept going into the 1990s, when changing environmental standards led to new ways of treating the sludge.

She has been restored to sea-going condition, and is listed in the Core Collection of the National Historic Fleet. Shieldhall is now a frequent sight around the Solent running excursions, crewed by volunteers. She has been to the Netherlands for the Dordrecht Steam Festival and has been at International Festivals of the Sea at Bristol and Portsmouth. Passengers are encouraged to visit the bridge and see the engine room, getting an understanding of the days of steam.

In July 2005, Shieldhall made a return visit to the Clyde, taking part in the River Festival in Glasgow, and berthing at Custom House Quay, Greenock. She made a number of excursions, taking passengers on cruises from Greenock on her old route down the Clyde to Arran.

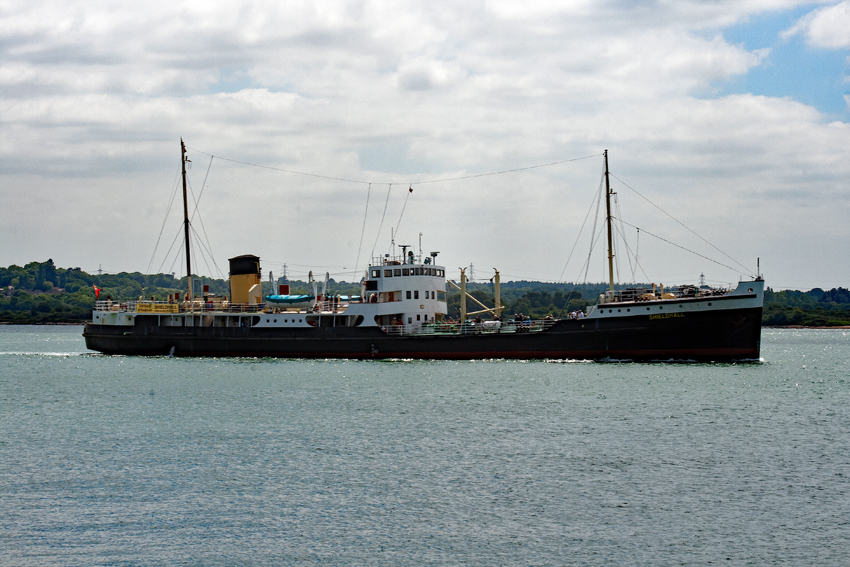
Shieldhall in "White Star" livery on Southampton Water

In 2012, to mark the centenary of the sinking of Titanic and to honour all lives lost at sea over the previous century, Shieldhall was repainted in White Star Line livery of black hull, white upper works, and buff funnel. Since 2012, the ship has continued this look.

A £1.4 million grant from the Heritage Lottery Fund (HLF) was announced, in April 2013, for essential hull works to meet modern regulations, improved passenger facilities and interpretation. Further grants were made in 2019 and 2020.

In September 2023, Shieldhall met with the paddle steamer Waverley off Bournemouth as Shieldhall made her way from Poole to Southampton, giving the rare sight of two ClydeBuilt ships sailing together on the South Coast. Also in 2023, Shieldhall was the official Committee vessel for the 2023 Ocean Globe race. As the 'guest starting vessel', her whistle, alongside a cannon at Cowes, sounded to signal the start of the race. Shieldhall sailed with sailing experts, enthusiasts, photographers and some of the competitors' families onboard, alongside the racers down towards The Needles, before returning to Southampton.

== In popular culture ==
Shieldhall has made many television appearances, including in Casualty, Lovejoy, Fred Dibnah's Age of Steam, and Coltrane's Planes and Automobiles. She represented the Titanic in Myths of the Titanic and played a Spanish ship, Begona, in Floella Benjamin's Coming to England. In 1999, the ship was used in Rede Globo's Brazilian telenovela Terra Nostra, playing a fictional Italian ship Andrea I.

Film appearances include Angela's Ashes and Bright Young Things.
