= John Coghlan (engineer) =

Irish engineer

- Born: 1824; County Kerry, Ireland
- Died: 1890 (aged 65–66); England

John Coghlan (c. 1824–1890) was an engineer born in County Kerry, Ireland. He spent thirty years in Argentina (1857–1887), during which he was in charge of several public works including Mitre Railway's extension.

== Career ==
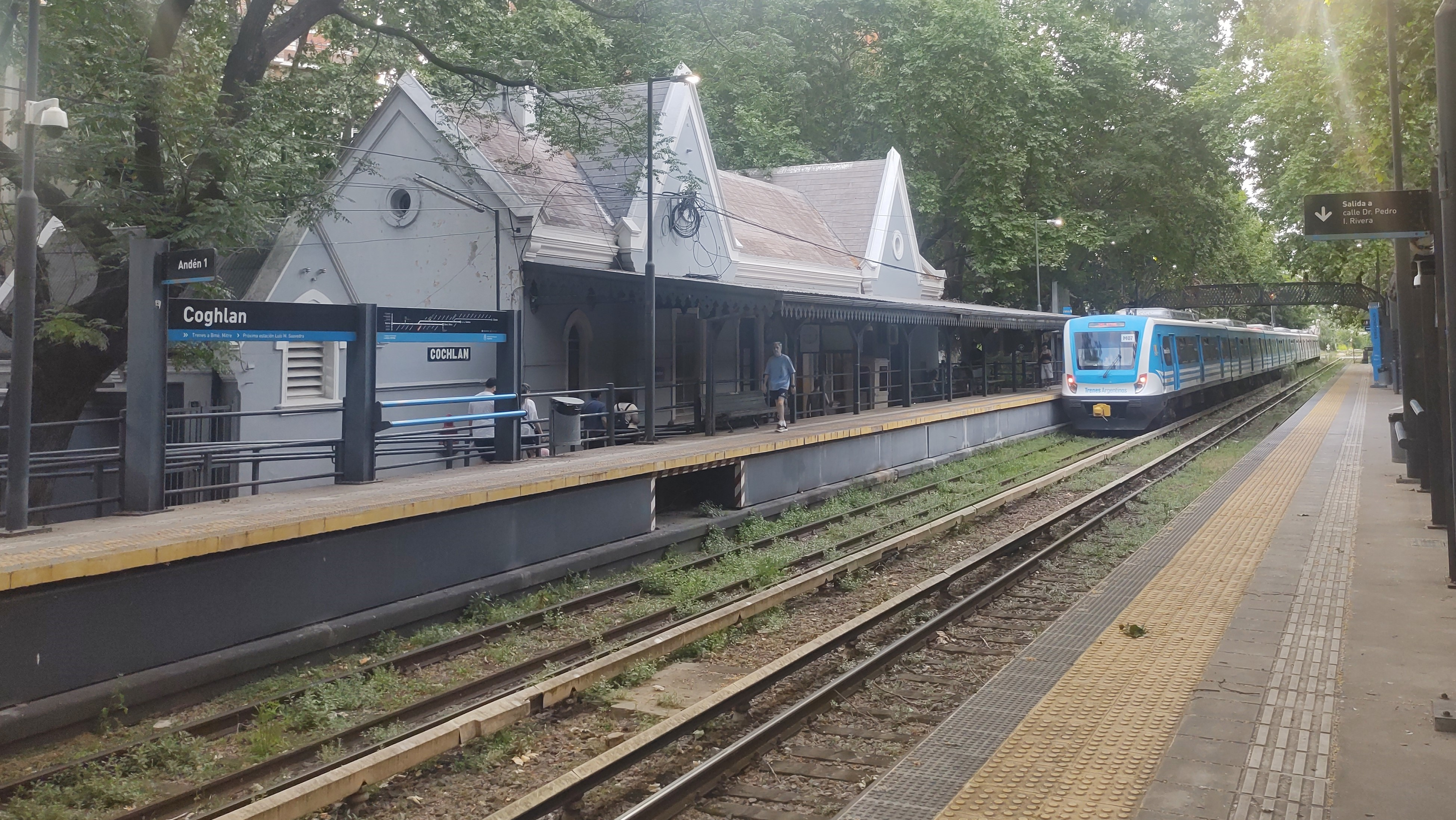
Coghlan Station, Buenos Aires in 2023

In 1859 he proposed improvements for the Buenos Aires harbour, taking into account the streams, silting and other characteristics of the Río de la Plata. In 1869 he carried out hypsometric studies of the core of the city and its drainage capability in relation to flooding. He is also credited with building drinking water and sewage systems in the city.

He was also involved in the Argentine railway system, extending the railway lines from Azul to Bahía Blanca during his term as chairman of the Gran Ferrocarril Sur Company, and from Campana to Rosario as chairman of the Ferrocarril de Buenos Aires a Campana Company.

In 1871, he corresponded with Charles Darwin, and sent him specimens from Buenos Aires through a third party.

He died in England in 1890. Argentine railway authorities gave his name to one of their railway stations a year after his death. What is now the barrio (neighbourhood) of Coghlan in Buenos Aires developed around the station named after him.

He is related to the Argentinan genealogist and civil servant, Eduardo Aquilio Coghlan.
