= John Frederick Bateman =

English civil engineer (1810–1889)

John Frederick La Trobe Bateman FRSE FRS MICE FRGS FGS FRSA
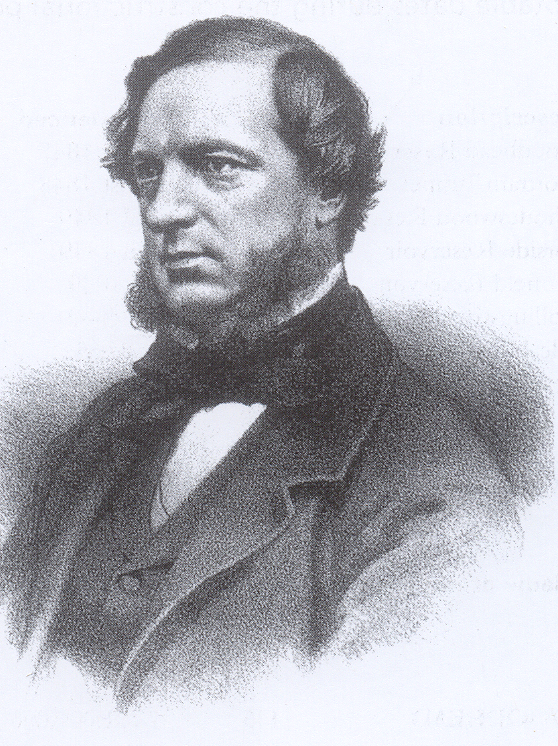
- John Bateman in 1859
- Born: John Frederick Bateman; 30 May 1810; Lower Wyke, Halifax, England
- Died: 10 June 1889 (aged 79); Farnham, Surrey, England
- Spouse: Anne Fairbairn
- Parent(s): John Bateman and Mary Agnes La Trobe
- Engineering career
- Discipline: Civil engineering
- Institutions: Institution of Civil Engineers (president)
- Projects: Longdendale Chain

John Frederick La Trobe Bateman FRSE FRS MICE FRGS FGS FRSA (30 May 1810 – 10 June 1889) was an English civil engineer whose work formed the basis of the modern United Kingdom water supply industry. For more than 50 years from 1835 he designed and constructed reservoirs and waterworks. His largest project was the Longdendale Chain system that has supplied Manchester with much of its water since the 19th century. The construction of what was in its day the largest chain of reservoirs in the world began in 1848 and was completed in 1877. Bateman became "the greatest dam-builder of his generation".

Bateman also worked on water supply systems for Glasgow, Belfast, Bolton, Chester, Dublin, Newcastle upon Tyne, Oldham, Perth, Stockport and Wolverhampton, amongst many others. He carried out projects abroad as well, including designing and constructing a drainage and water supply system for Buenos Aires, and water supply schemes for Naples, Constantinople and Colombo.

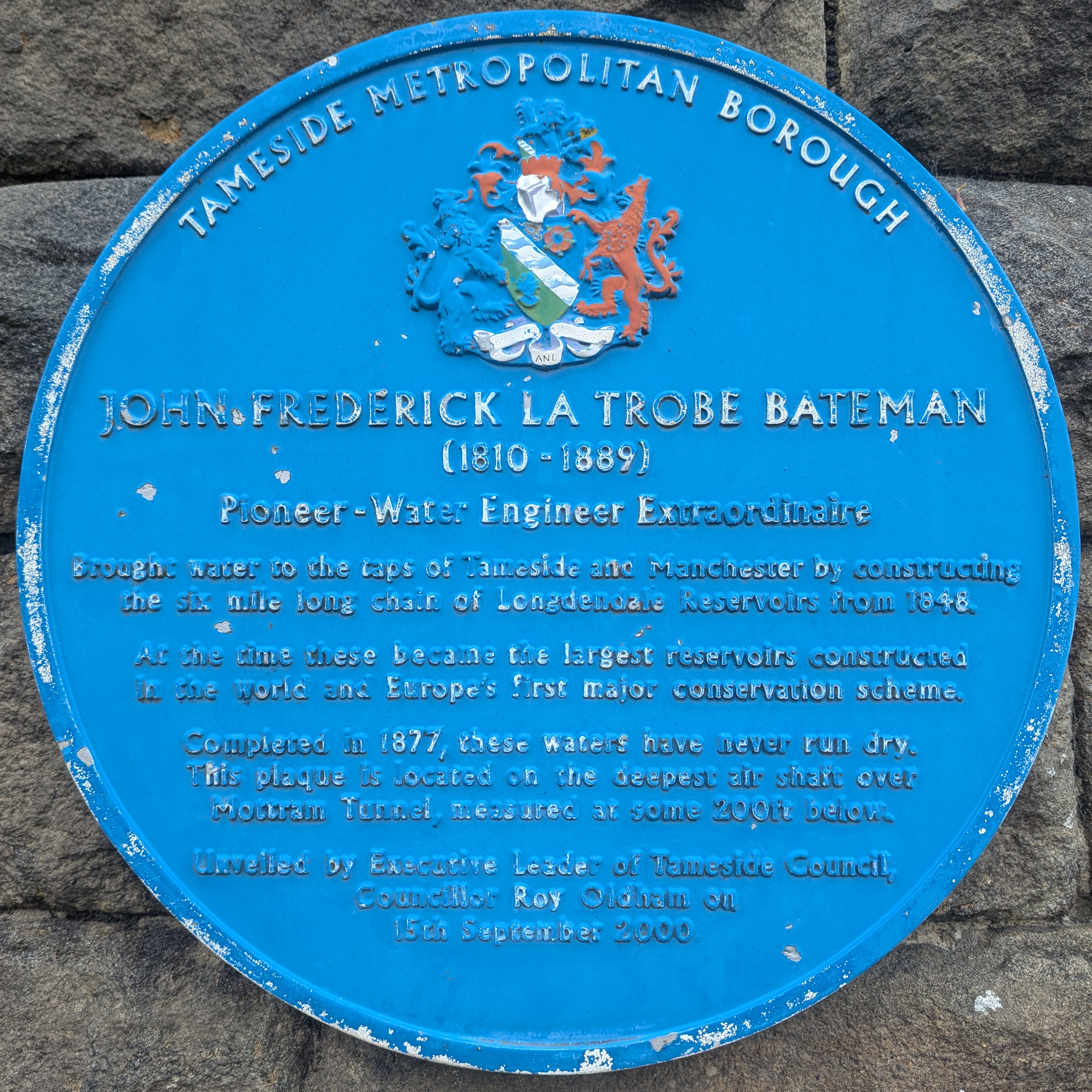
A blue plaque in Mottram in Longdendale commemorating Bateman's work

Bateman served as President of the Institution of Civil Engineers in Britain in 1878 and 1879.

In 1883, Bateman assumed his mother's family surname of La Trobe, by royal licence, becoming John Frederic La Trobe Bateman.

== Education and early life ==
John Bateman was born on 30 May 1810 at Lower Wyke, a Moravian Church settlement near Bradford. He was the eldest son of John Bateman, "an unsuccessful inventor", and his wife Mary Agnes, daughter of Benjamin La Trobe, a member of the Fairfield Moravian Church, near Ashton under Lyne. He spent his early years at Moravian settlements and was educated at the Moravian schools in Fairfield and Ockbrook before being apprenticed to a surveyor and mining engineer in Oldham in 1825.

== Career ==
Bateman started his civil engineering business in 1833 and directed it alone until between 1881 and 1885 when he worked in partnership with George Hill. In 1888 he took his son-in-law, Richard Clere Parsons, and his son, Lee La Trobe Bateman, into partnership.

Bateman was elected a member of the Institution of Civil Engineers on 23 June 1840 and was its president in 1878 and 1879. He was elected a Fellow of the Royal Society (FRS) on 7 June 1860 and was a Fellow of the Royal Society of Edinburgh (FRSE), the Royal Geographical Society (FRGS), the Geological Society (FGS), the Royal Society of Arts (FRSA), and the Royal Institution.

=== Early works ===
In 1834 Bateman investigated the causes of flooding on the River Medlock, which led to a study of hydraulic engineering. In 1835, in association with William Fairbairn, he laid out the reservoirs on the River Bann in Ireland. From that time he was almost continually employed in the construction of reservoirs and waterworks.

In all his undertakings he advocated soft water in preference to hard water, and favoured gravitation schemes where they were practicable to avoid the necessity of pumping. He devoted much attention to methods of measuring rainfall, accumulated a quantity of statistics on the subject, and wrote several papers describing his observations.

=== Manchester water supply ===
The greatest waterworks project undertaken by Bateman was that connected with supplying water to Manchester and Salford from a chain of reservoirs in Longdendale. He was consulted about such a scheme in 1844 and by 1846 had devised a project for obtaining water from the Pennine hills. Work commenced in 1848 and was not finished until spring 1877. The Longdendale Chain scheme was designed to supply a population less than half that of Manchester in 1882, and additional sources of supply had to be found. At Bateman's suggestion the corporation decided to extract water from Thirlmere in the Lake District. A bill introduced into parliament in 1878 was rejected but passed in 1879. Bateman superintended the works, assisted by George Hill. In 1884 Bateman published a History and Description of the Manchester Waterworks.

=== Loch Katrine and Milngavie waterworks ===
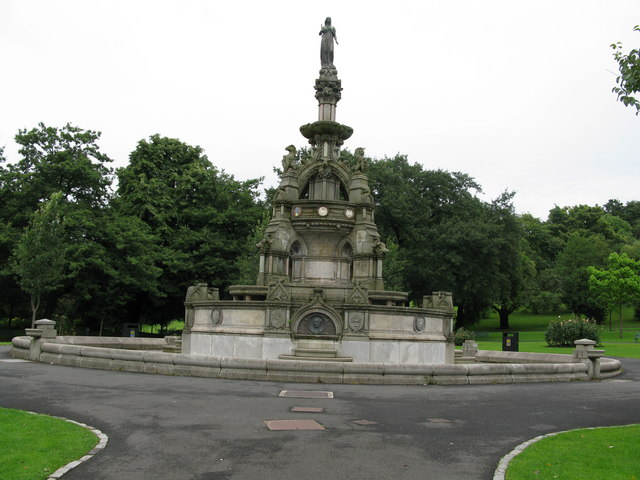
The Stewart Memorial Fountain, celebrating the establishment of the Loch Katrine and Milngavie waterworks

In 1852 Bateman was consulted by Glasgow Council in regard to its water supply. In 1854–85, on Bateman's advice, a bill was obtained to supply water to Glasgow from Loch Katrine. Work commenced in spring 1856 and was completed by March 1860. The works extend over 34 miles, and were described by James Morris Gale as worthy to "bear comparison with the most extensive aqueducts in the world, not excluding those of ancient Rome".

=== Later works ===
In 1855 he wrote a paper for the British Association, On the present state of our Knowledge on the Supply of Water to Towns, enunciating the nature of the problem, outlining previous measures, enumerating sources from which towns could be supplied, and discussing their merits. In 1865 he published a pamphlet On the Supply of Water to London from the Sources of the River Severn, a scheme he designed and surveyed at his own expense. A royal commission in 1868 reported in favour of the project, a gravitation scheme to convey 230 million gallons of water a day to the city.

Bateman was connected with harbour and dock trusts throughout the British Isles, including the Clyde Navigation Trust, for which he was consulting engineer, and the Shannon Inundation Inquiry in 1863, on which he was employed by government.

In addition to undertakings at home Bateman carried out several works abroad. In 1869 in a pamphlet Channel Railway, written with Julian John Révy, he proposed to construct a submarine railway between France and England in a cast-iron tube. In the same year he represented the Royal Society at the opening of the Suez Canal, and wrote a report of his visit, which was read to the Society on 6 January 1870, and published in the Proceedings. In winter 1870 he visited Buenos Aires, at the request of the Argentine government, for the purpose of laying out harbour works for that city. His plans were not adopted, but he was employed to design and carry out drainage and water supply works for the city.

In 1874 he prepared water supply schemes for Naples and Constantinople, and was engineer for reclamation schemes in Spain and Majorca. Crown agents in the colonies employed him in Ceylon to design works to supply Colombo with water.

Alongside his assistant, Alfred Moore, he developed the Bateman and Moore's Firecock which was adopted in many large cities and towns.

== Personal life ==
On 1 September 1841 Bateman married Anne, only daughter of William Fairbairn, and they had three sons and four daughters. In 1883 he assumed by royal licence the prefix, surname, and arms of La Trobe, in compliment to his grandfather. Bateman died on 10 June 1889 at his home, Moor Park in Farnham, an estate he bought in 1859.

== Commemorations ==
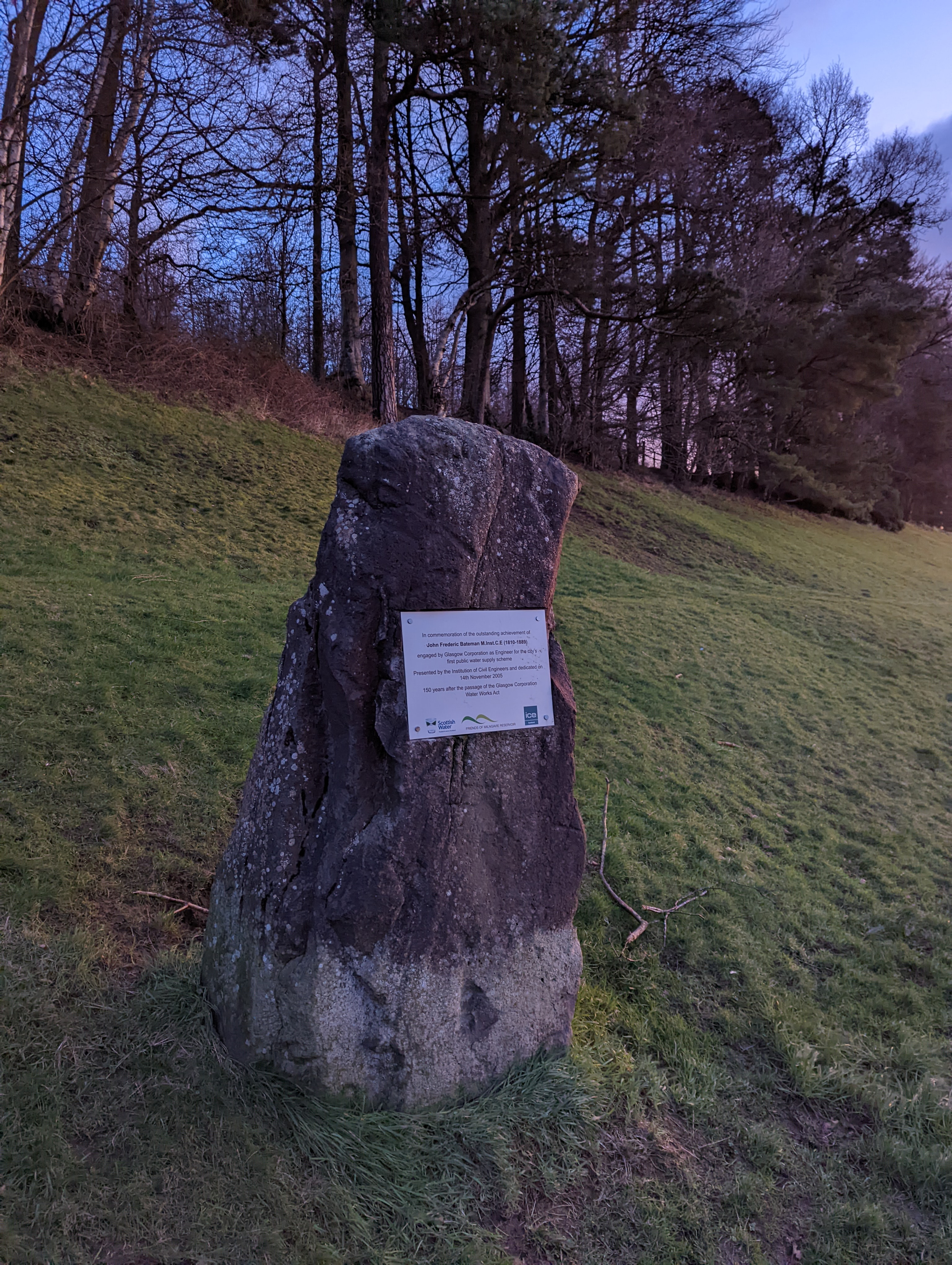
Memorial to John Frederick Bateman at the Milngavie Waterworks

- In 1955 a street in Sa Pobla, Mallorca was given the name Bateman commemorating his works in Albufera de Mallorca.
- In November 2005 a commemoration stone was laid at the Milngavie Waterworks by the Institution of Civil Engineers (right).
- On 15 September 2000, the leader of the Metropolitan Borough of Tameside unveiled a blue plaque on the deepest air shaft of the Mottram Tunnel, a 3,100-yard (2,800 m) long pipeline connecting the valleys of the Etherow and the Tame. The plaque is inscribed:

John Frederick La Trobe Bateman
(1810–1889)
Pioneer – Water Engineer extraordinaire
Brought water to the taps of Tameside and Manchester by constructing the six mile long chain of Longendale Reservoirs from 1848.
At the time these became the largest reservoirs constructed in the world and Europe's first major conservation scheme.
Completed in 1877, these waters have never run dry. This plaque is located on the deepest air shaft over Mottram Tunnel, measured at some 200 ft below.

Professional and academic associations
| Preceded by George Robert Stephenson | President of the Institution of Civil Engineers; December 1877 – December 1879 | Succeeded by William Henry Barlow |
