= List of reservoirs in Derbyshire =

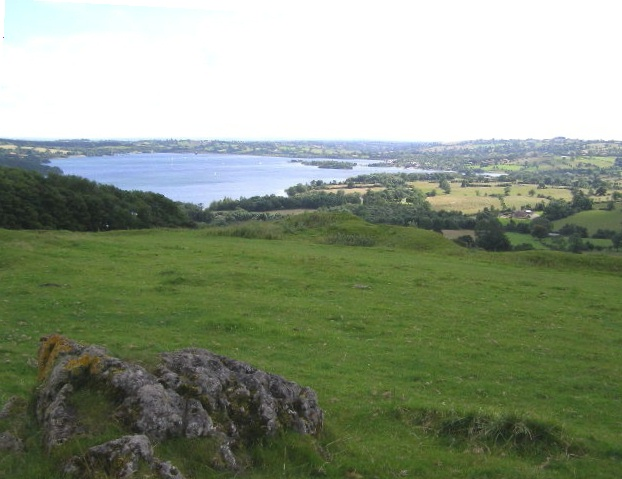
Carsington Water

This is a list of reservoirs in Derbyshire, England, arranged in order of capacity.

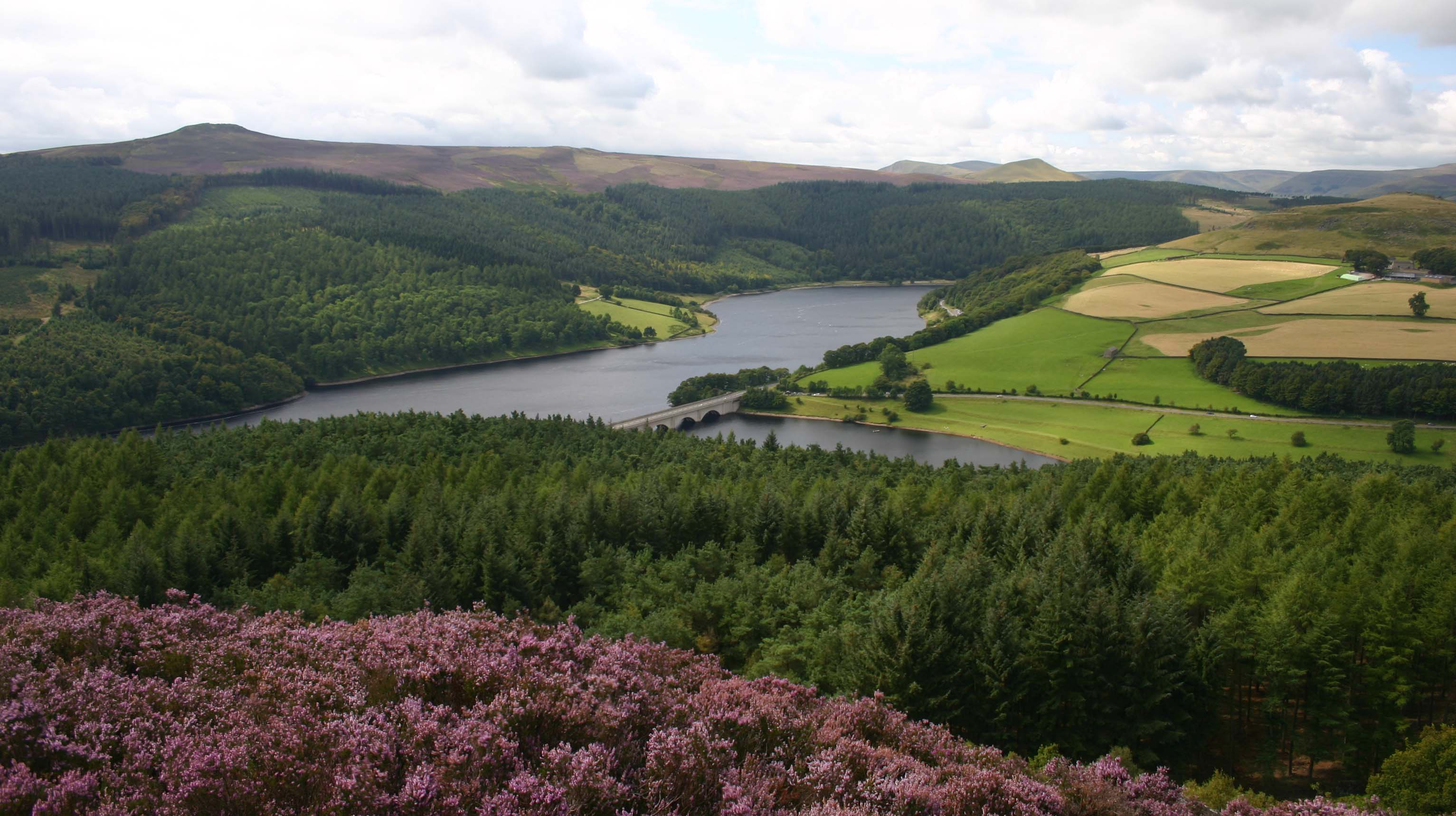
Ladybower Reservoir

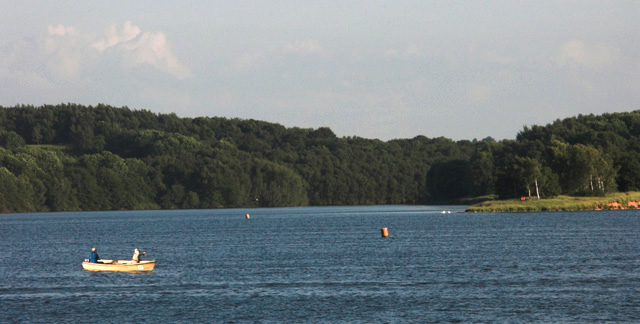
Foremark Reservoir

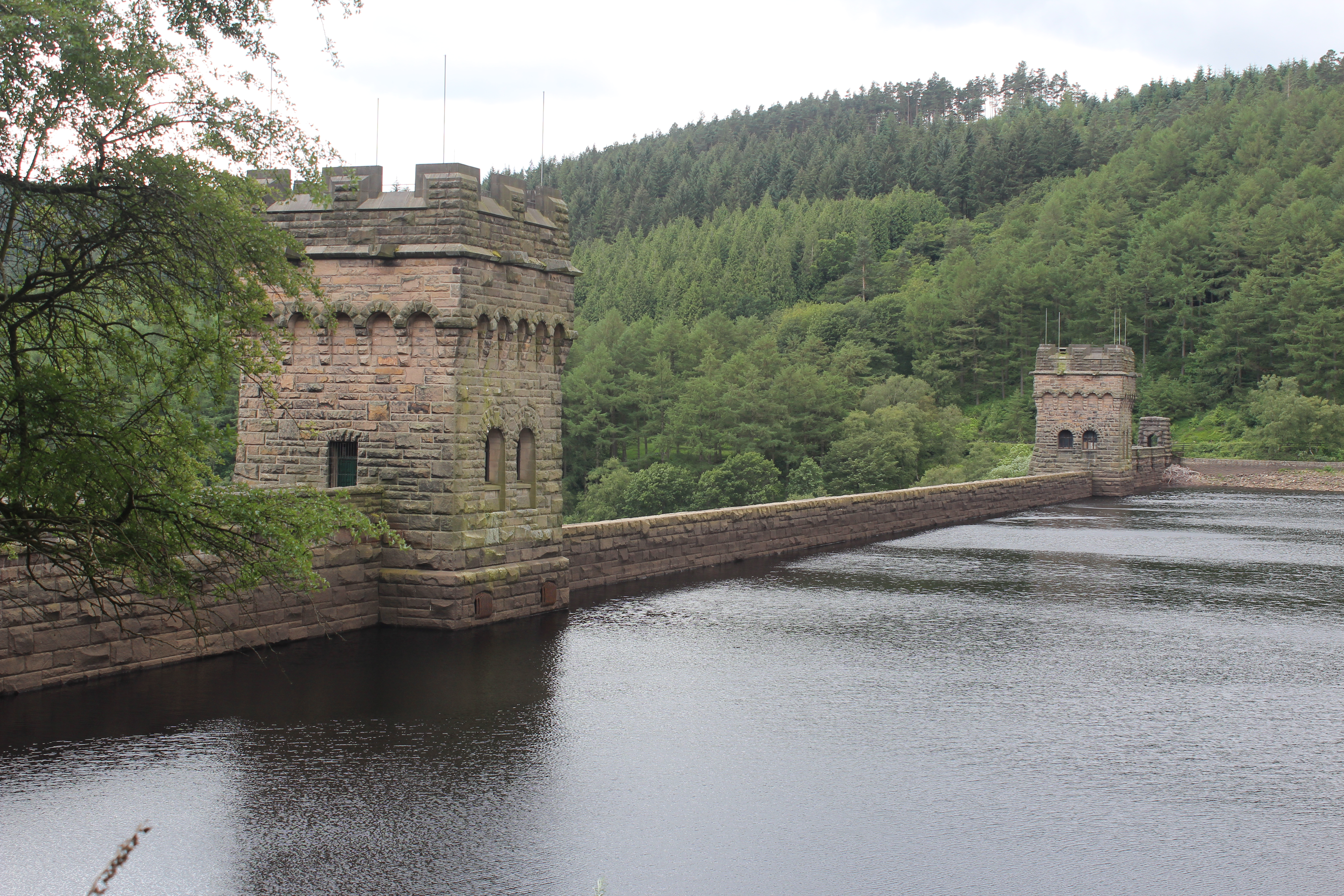
Derwent Reservoir

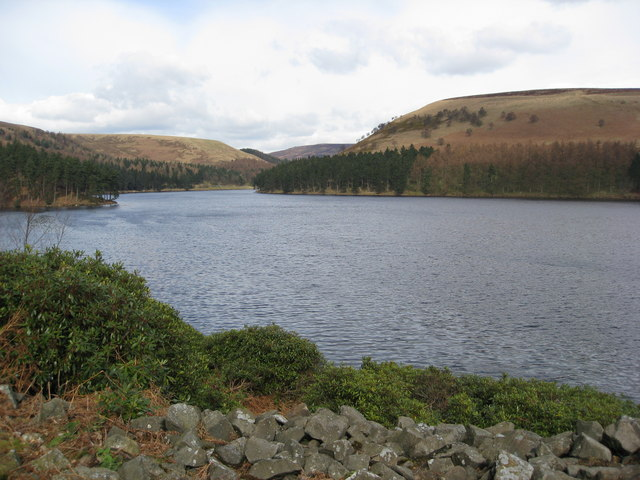
Howden Reservoir

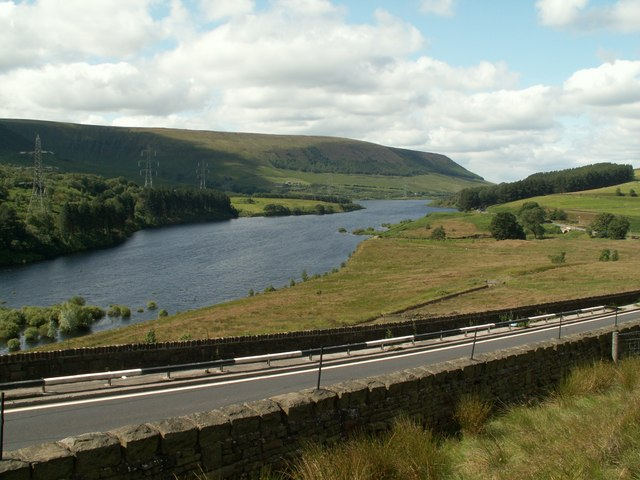
Torside Reservoir

Reservoir	Year Completed	Max Capacity (m^{3})	Length (km)	Max Depth (m)	Grid reference of dam
Carsington Water	1992	35,412,000	3.9	33	SK244505
Ladybower Reservoir	1943	27,800,000	4.0	41	SK200855
Foremark Reservoir	1977	13,193,486	2.0		SK330240
Derwent Reservoir	1914	9,640,000	3.0	35	SK172898
Howden Reservoir	1912	8,600,000	2.0		SK170925
Torside Reservoir	1864	6,700,000	2.3		SK056983
Staunton Harold Reservoir	1964	6,400,000	2.7	25	SK374237
Ogston Reservoir	1958	5,900,000	1.6		SK380600
Woodhead Reservoir	1877	5,370,000	2.0	22	SK081995
Fernliee Reservoir	1938	5,000,000	1.8	38	SK014777
Errwood Reservoir	1967	4,215,000	1.4		SK015758
Bottoms Reservoir	1877	3,000,000	1.0		SK023970
Valehouse Reservoir	1869	2,688,000	1.3	12	SK032974
Kinder Reservoir	1911	2,340,000	0.8		SK055881
Rhodeswood Reservoir	1855	2,270,000	1.2	21	SK043981
Combs Reservoir	1797	1,484,000	1.1		SK034799
Toddbrook Reservoir	1838	1,288,000	1.0	24	SK008811
Arnfield Reservoir	1854	950,000	0.6		SK013972
Linacre Upper Reservoir	1885	575,000	0.6	19	SK328727
Butterley Reservoir	1794	450,000	0.8		SK401520
Linacre Middle Reservoir	1904	410,000	0.5	13	SK334725
Linacre Lower Reservoir	1855	140,000	0.4	9	SK338725
Codnor Park Reservoir	1794		0.5		SK432516
Hurst Reservoir	1837		0.4		SK055938
Swineshaw Reservoir	1864		0.5		SK003991

== See also ==
- List of reservoirs in the Peak District
- List of dams and reservoirs in the United Kingdom
