= List of reservoirs in the Peak District =

List of reservoirs in the English Peak District

This is a list of reservoirs in the Peak District of England, most of which lie within the Peak District National Park, but others lie outside its borders (marked with * in the table below).

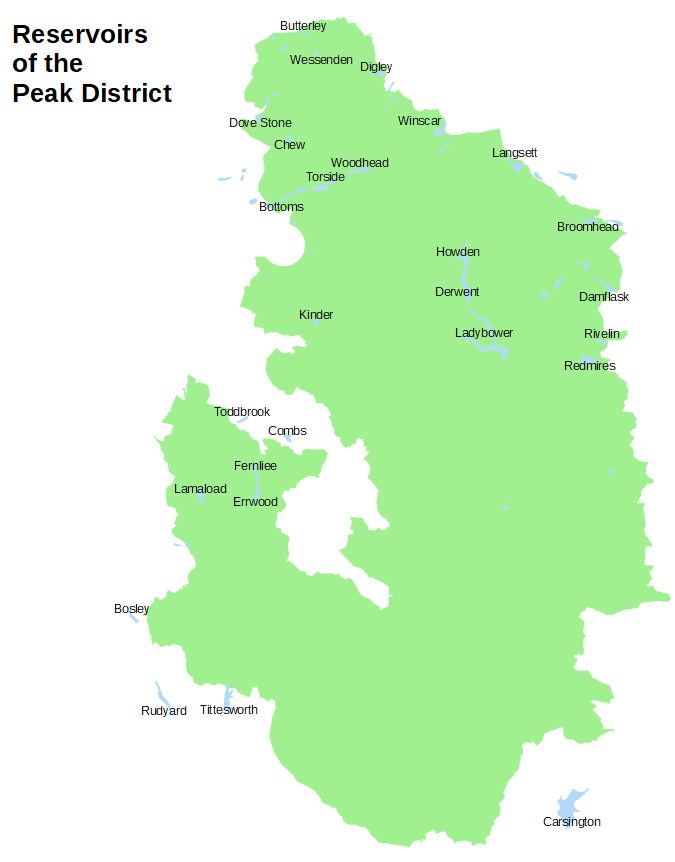
Reservoirs of the Peak District

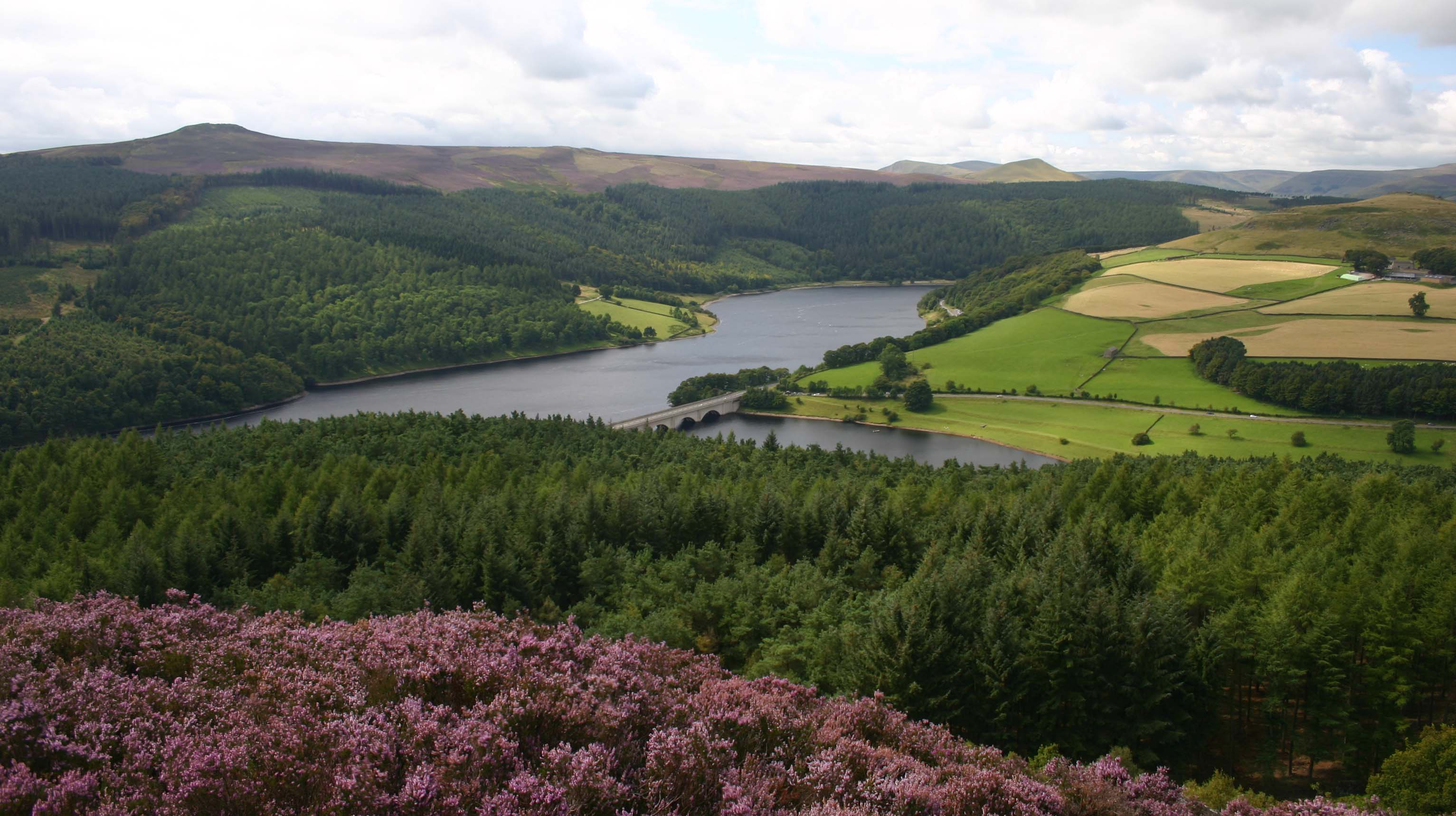
Ladybower Reservoir

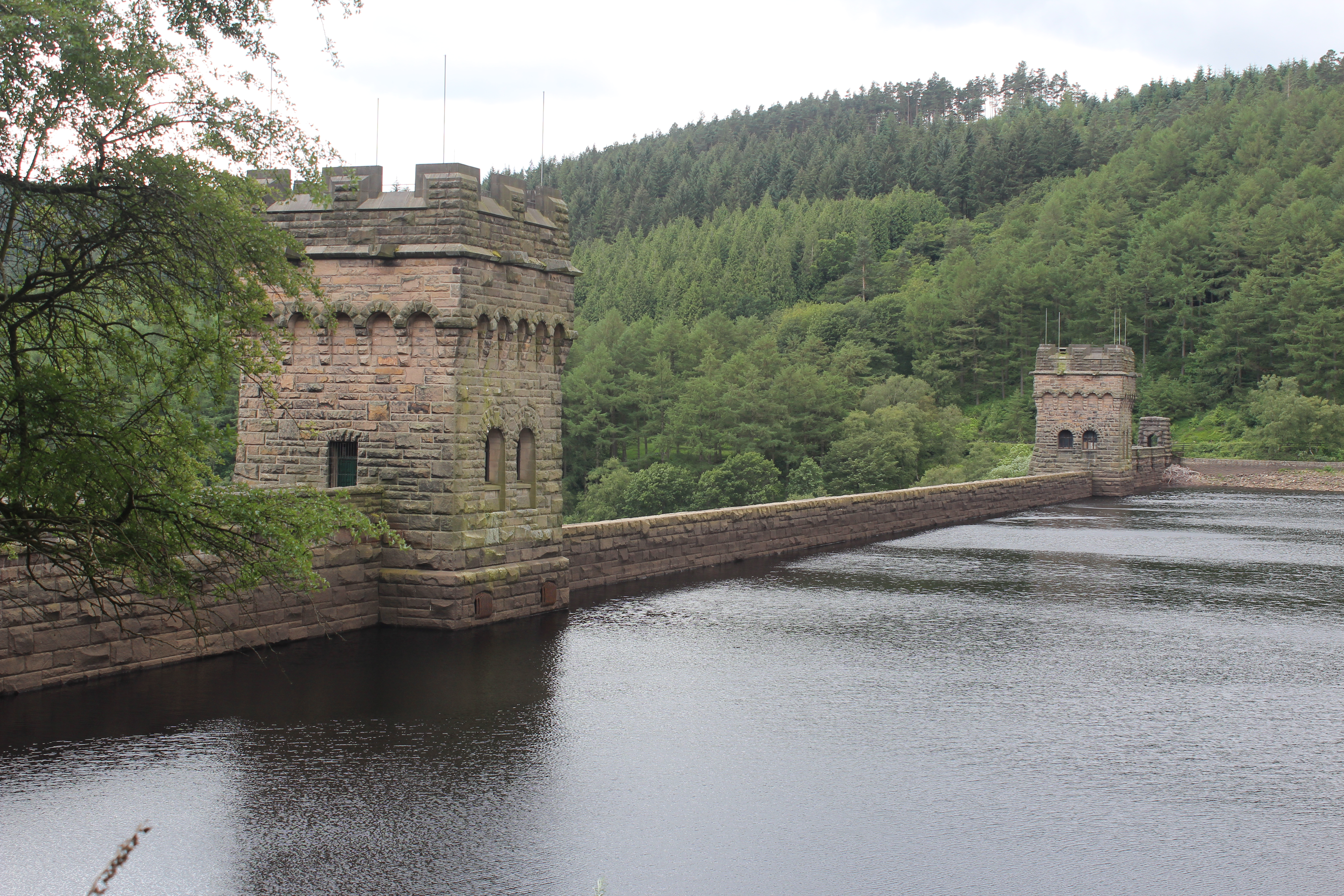
Derwent Reservoir

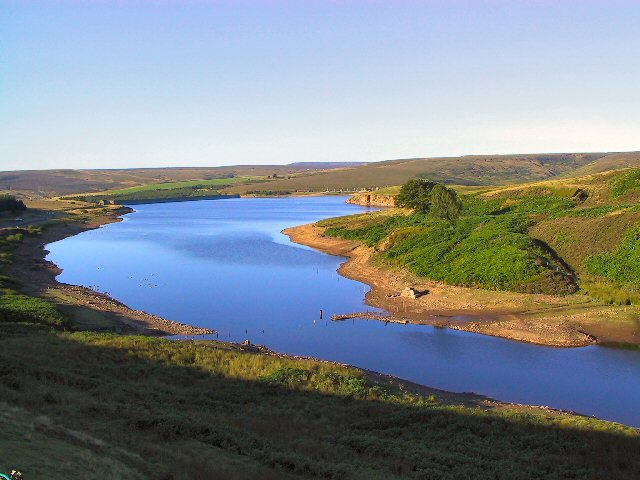
Winscar Reservoir

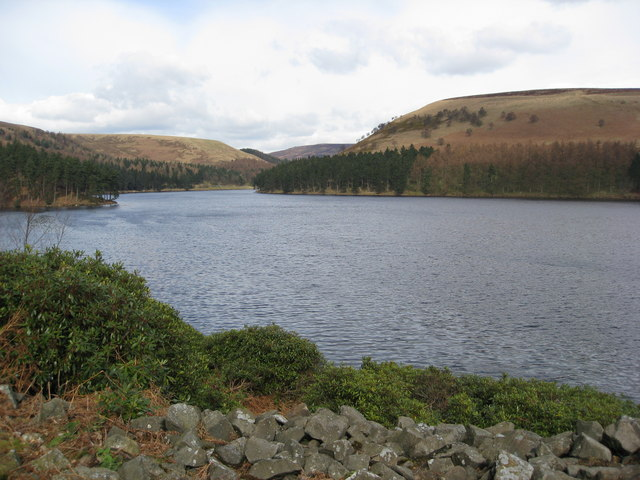
Howden Reservoir

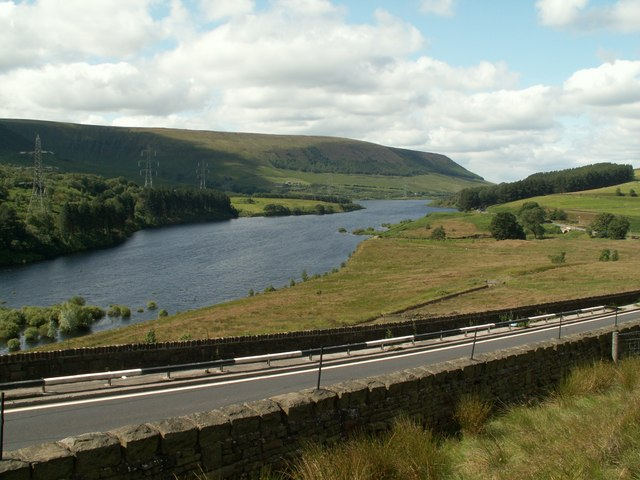
Torside Reservoir

Reservoir	Year Completed	Max Capacity (m^{3})	Length (km)	Max Depth (m)	Grid reference of dam
Ladybower Reservoir	1943	27,800,000	4.0	41	SK200855
Derwent Reservoir	1914	9,640,000	3.0	35	SK172898
Winscar Reservoir	1975	9,169,194	1.7	42	SE154025
Howden Reservoir	1912	8,600,000	2.0		SK170925
Torside Reservoir	1864	6,700,000	2.3		SK056983
Tittesworth Reservoir*	1858	6,440,000	1.8		SJ993587
Langsett Reservoir	1904	6,400,000	1.6	30	SE213003
Woodhead Reservoir	1877	5,370,000	2.0	22	SK081995
Dovestone Reservoir	1968	5,048,000	1.5	31	SE014035
Fernliee Reservoir	1938	5,000,000	1.8	38	SK014777
Broomhead Reservoir	1929	4,937,282	1.5		SK269960
Damflask Reservoir	1896	4,250,900	2.2	27	SK284907
Errwood Reservoir	1967	4,215,000	1.4		SK015758
Dale Dike Reservoir	1864	3,240,000	1.3		SK243917
Bottoms Reservoir	1877	3,000,000	1.0		SK023970
Digley Reservoir	1954	3,000,000	0.8		SE111069
Valehouse Reservoir	1869	2,688,000	1.3	12	SK032974
Kinder Reservoir	1911	2,340,000	0.8		SK055881
Rhodeswood Reservoir	1855	2,270,000	1.2	21	SK043981
More Hall Reservoir*	1929	2,172,989	1.3		SK286957
Agden Reservoir	1869	2,100,000	1.2		SK261923
Strines Reservoir	1869	2,059,000	0.8		SK232905
Lamaload Reservoir	1964	1,910,000	0.8		SJ970753
Midhope Reservoir*	1903	1,859,000	1.0		SK223997
Butterley Reservoir, West Yorkshire	1794	1,773,000	0.4		SE051101
Redmires Upper Reservoir	1854	1,559,310	0.7	15	SK260854
Combs Reservoir	1797	1,484,000	1.1		SK034799
Bosley Reservoir*	1831	1,460,000	1.5		SJ925654
Toddbrook Reservoir*	1838	1,288,000	1.0	24	SK008811
Brownhill Reservoir*	1932	1,209,000	0.8		SE117063
Arnfield Reservoir*	1854	950,000	0.6		SK013972
Chew Reservoir	1912	936,500	0.8		SE035019
Redmires Middle Reservoir	1854	855,000	0.6	14	SK264854
Rivelin Dams Lower	1845	800,000	0.6		SK275868
Yeoman Hey Reservoir	1880	780,000	0.7	20	SE021045
Rudyard Lake*	1799	640,000	3.0		SJ939610
Redmires Lower Reservoir	1847	634,180	0.5	14	SK267855
Trentabank Reservoir	1929	631,900	0.5		SJ961713
Linacre Upper Reservoir	1885	575,000	0.6	19	SK328727
Ridgegate Reservoir*	1850	545,530	0.7		SJ952714
Wessenden Reservoir	1836	486,430	0.5		SE058088
Greenfield Reservoir	1870	464,000	0.4	20	SE028054
Yateholme Reservoir	1878	415,000	0.5		SE111047
Linacre Middle Reservoir	1904	410,000	0.5	13	SK334725
Ramsden Reservoir	1883	394,000	0.5		SE114057
Bollinhurst Reservoir	1872	384,145	0.5		SJ973837
Wessenden Head Reservoir	1881	372,780	0.3		SE069076
Blakeley Reservoir	1904	363,690	0.4		SE054097
Horse Coppice Reservoir	1861	331,865	0.5		SJ969838
Bilberry Reservoir	1840	254,000	0.3		SE103070
Riding Wood Reservoir	1878	235,000	0.4		SE116051
Rivelin Dams Upper	1848	220,000	0.3		SK272869
Snailsden Reservoir	1870s	196,440	0.5		SE136040
Hurst Reservoir	1837	(drained in 2013) 167,000	0.4		SK055938
Linacre Lower Reservoir	1855	140,000	0.4	9	SK338725
Black Moss Reservoir			0.3		SE033088
Diggle Reservoir			0.2		SE021081
Redbrook Reservoir			0.4		SE027099
Swellands Reservoir			0.3		SE038090
Swineshaw Reservoir*	1864		0.5		SK003991
Windleden Lower Reservoir			0.4		SE157019
Windleden Upper Reservoir			0.5		SE153012

== See also ==
- List of rivers in the Peak District
- List of reservoirs in Derbyshire
- List of dams and reservoirs in the United Kingdom
