= Burbage Edge =

Hill in the Derbyshire Peak District

Coordinates: 53°15′21″N 1°57′32″W

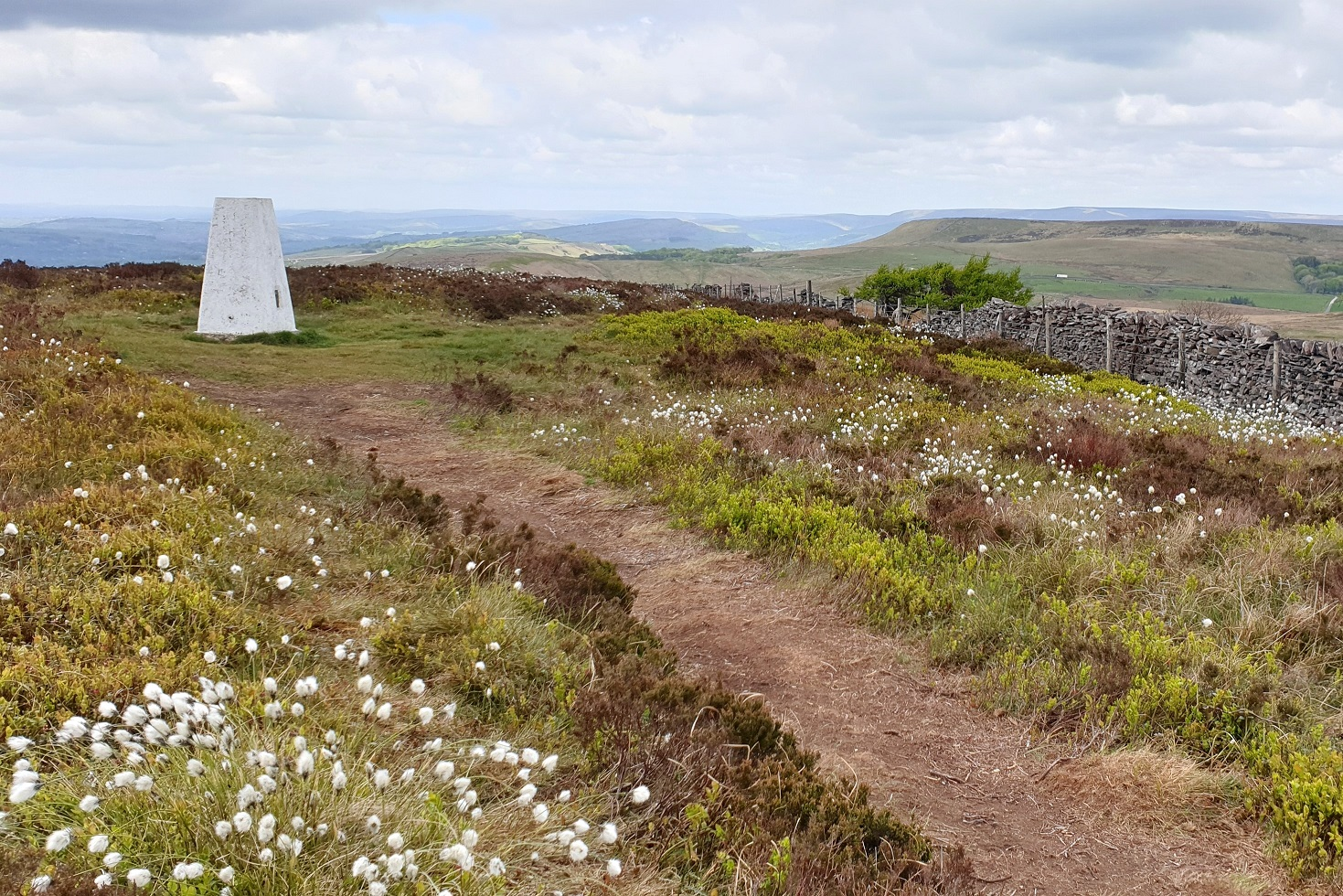
- Looking north from the summit towards Combs Moss

Highest point
- Elevation: 500 metres (1,640 ft)

Geography
- Location: Peak District, England
- OS grid: SK 0296 7325
- Topo map: OS Explorer OL24

Burbage Edge is a gritstone escarpment overlooking the Burbage district of Buxton in Derbyshire, in the Peak District. The hill's summit (marked by a trig pillar) is 500 metres (1,600 ft) above sea level.

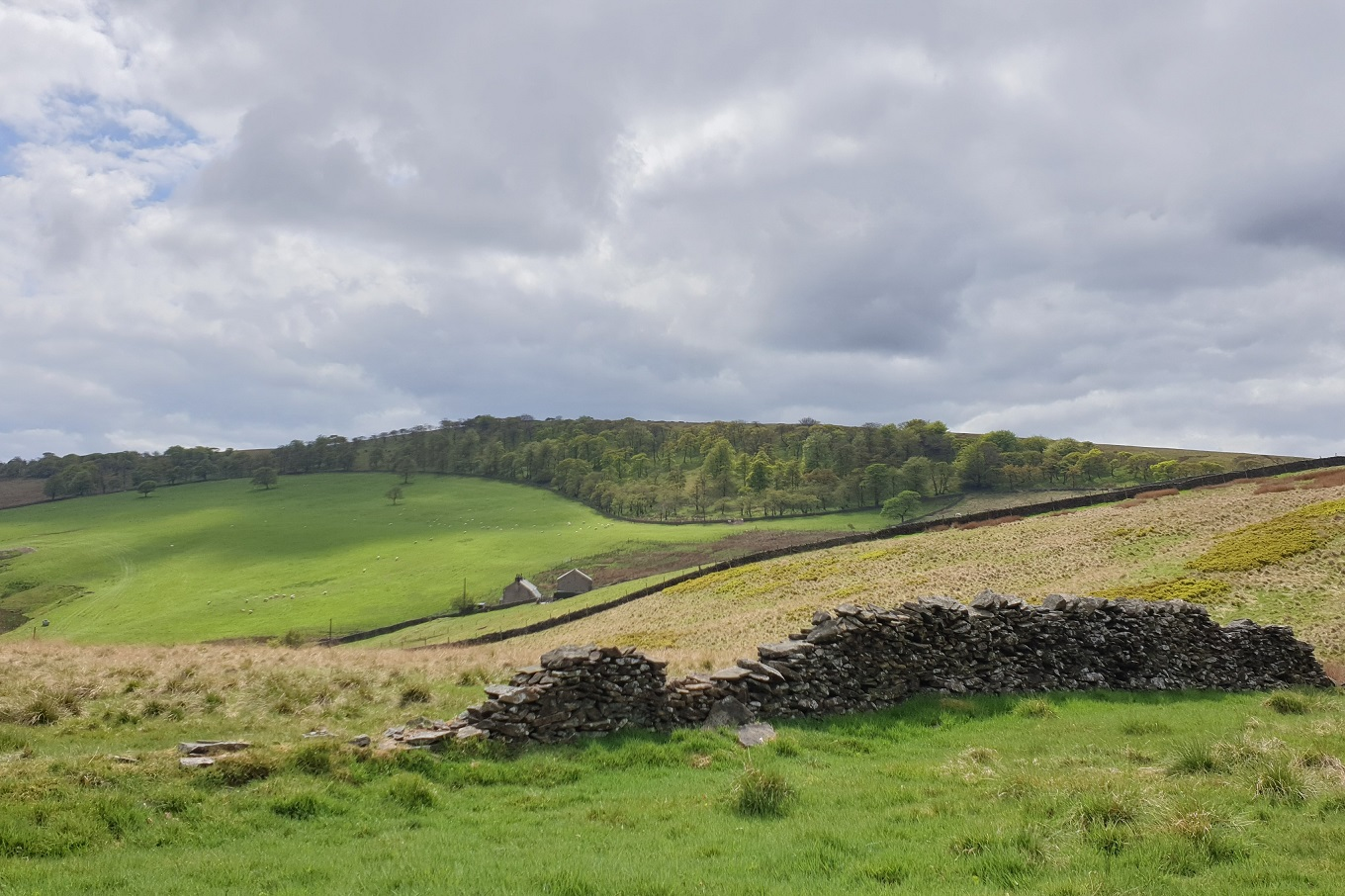
Burbage Edge view from the east

The boundary of the Peak District National Park runs along the ridge and across the summit. The ridge of Burbage Edge marks the western gritstone edge of the Derbyshire Dome, extending south as Axe Edge and to the north as Combs Moss. The ridge is the watershed between the River Goyt (Mersey river basin) and the River Wye (Trent river basin). To the west is Goyt's Moss moorland, the Cat and Fiddle Inn and the Upper Goyt Valley. Following the Countryside and Rights of Way Act 2000, the area of the upper ridge and moorland were designated as "Open Access" land for the public.

Coal was mined at Goyt's Moss colliery from the early 17th-century until 1893 when the coal deposits had been exhausted. The coal was initially extracted by surface mining, then in the 1700s using shallow shafts (with coal raised using hand winches) and later in the 1800s from deeper shafts using horse-drawn winding gins. Most of the coal produced was supplied to the Duke of Devonshire's limekilns at nearby Grin Low. The site of the colliery's remains is a protected Scheduled Monument.

Burbage Edge is part of the Goyt Valley Site of Special Scientific Interest (SSSI). Heather is the main plant but the heathland is habitat for a variety of native grasses, rushes, sedges and shrubs including bilberry, crowberry, cowberry and cross-leaved heath. Hare’s-tail cottongrass and sphagnum moss are common. The area is important for upland breeding birds including a large population of golden plover, as well as red grouse, curlew, lapwing, whinchat, snipe, twite, ring ouzel and merlin.

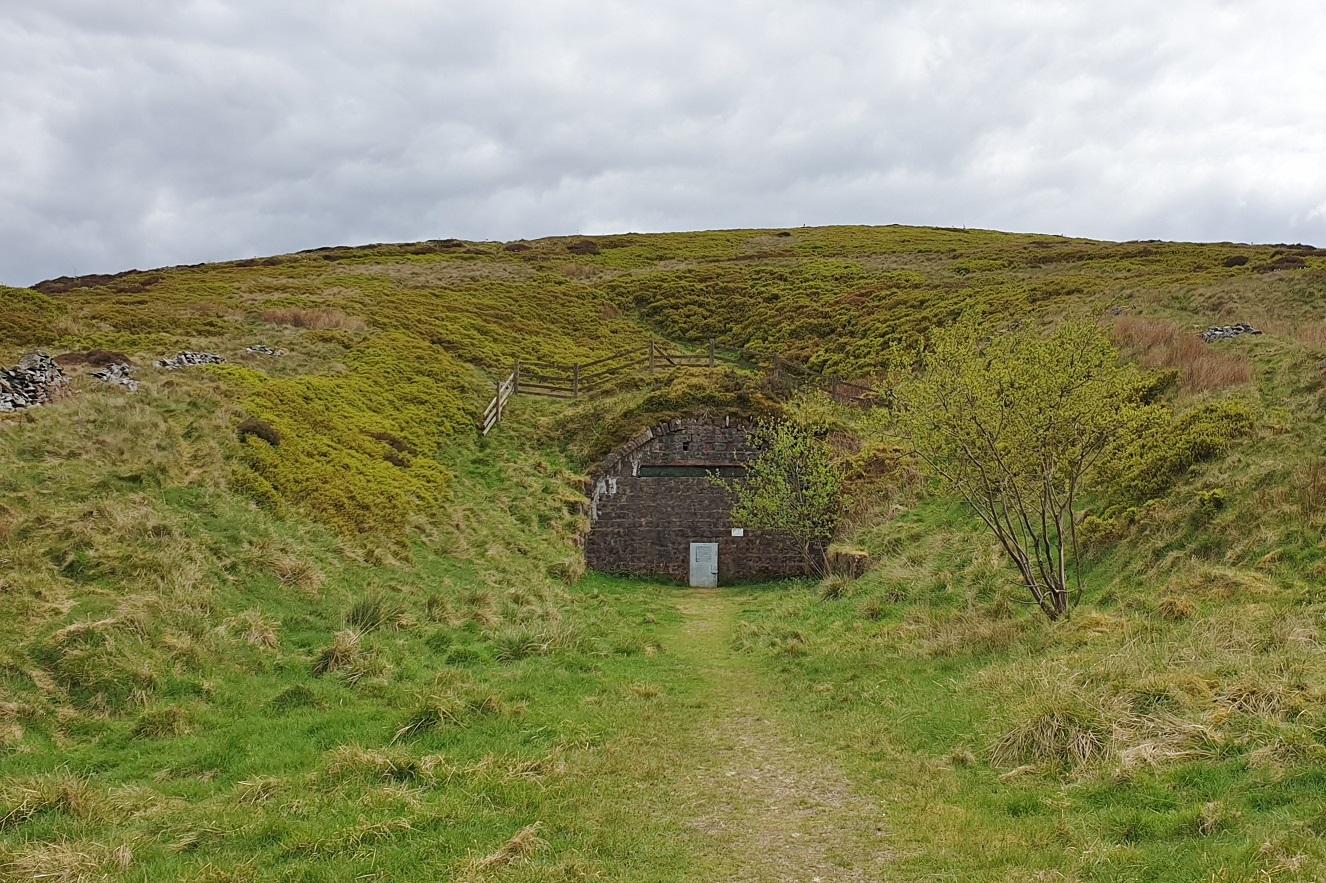
Disused railway tunnel through Burbage Edge

The disused Cromford and High Peak Railway line (which connected the High Peak canal at Whaley Bridge with the River Derwent in Cromford since 1831) ran through a tunnel beneath Burbage Edge. This stretch of the railway line was closed in 1896. The Peak District Boundary Walk long distance footpath follows the disused railway line from Burbage Edge down to Errwood Reservoir.

In October 1934 a De Havilland Moth plane crashed on Burbage Edge in heavy mist, while struggling with strong winds. The plane was en route from Broxbourne in Essex to Stanley Park at Blackpool. The ex-RAF pilot and passenger took half an hour to escape from the overturned wreck and walked to the Cat and Fiddle for help. In May 1943 an Airspeed Oxford RAF plane also crashed on Burbage Edge while on a solo circular night flight from Wheaton Aston. At dawn in low cloud, the plane hit the dry stone wall along the ridge of Burbage Edge. The pilot Sergeant John Wilson was killed by the impact.
