= Kirklees Way =

Long-distance footpath in West Yorkshire, England

Coordinates: 53.825°N 1.429°W

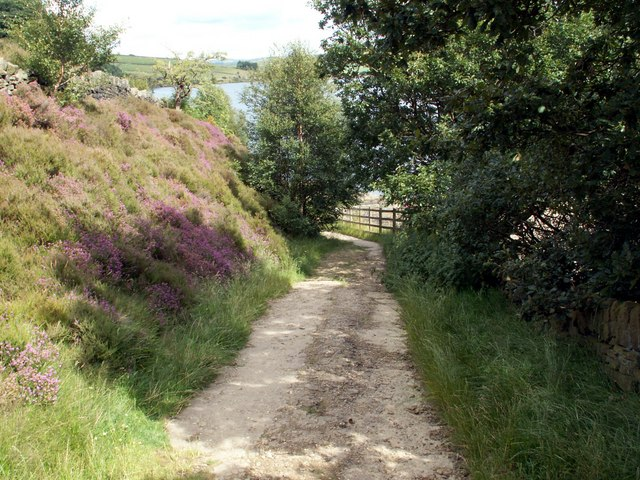
- Kirklees Way near Digley Reservoir
- Length: 75 mi (121 km)
- Location: West Yorkshire, England
- Trailheads: circular
- Use: Hiking
- Season: All year

The Kirklees Way is a 72-mile (115 km) waymarked footpath in Kirklees metropolitan district, West Yorkshire, England. It was opened in 1990 and includes the upper Colne Valley, Spen Valley and Holme Valley.

The Peak District Boundary Walk follows the Kirklees Way for a few miles either side of Holme.
