= Errwood Hall =

Ruins of Victorian mansion

Coordinates: 53.269463°N 1.987254°W

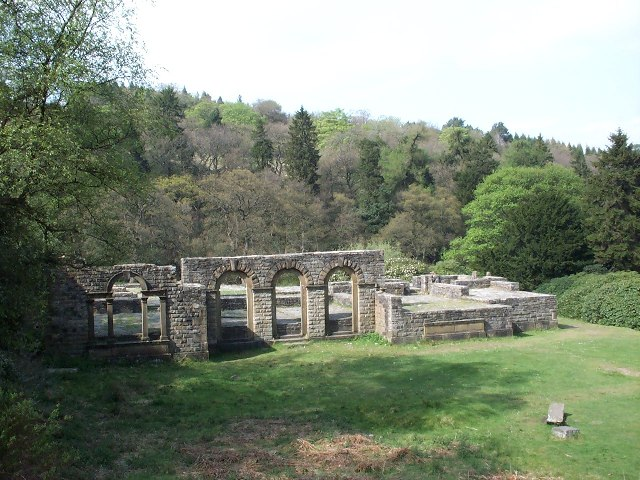

- Location within Derbyshire
- OS grid reference: SK008747
- District: High Peak
- Shire county: Derbyshire
- Region: East Midlands
- Country: England
- Sovereign state: United Kingdom
- Police: Derbyshire
- Fire: Derbyshire
- Ambulance: East Midlands

The ruin of Errwood Hall is a popular tourist destination in the scenic Upper Goyt Valley within the Peak District of England.

== History ==
Errwood Hall was built in the 1830s by Samuel Grimshawe, a wealthy Manchester businessman, and was occupied by the Grimshawe family for the next hundred years. The hall was the centre of a thriving estate of over 2,000 acres (8.1 km^{2}), consisting of several farms, a school, the Cat and Fiddle Inn, a private coal mine and the hamlet of Goyt's Bridge. The family planted many specimen trees including an abundance of azaleas and rhododendrons.

Samuel’s grandchildren were the last members of the family to live in the hall, which was later demolished in connection with the construction of the Fernilee Reservoir in 1934. Stones from the demolished hall were used to construct the water treatment works below the reservoir.

== Today ==
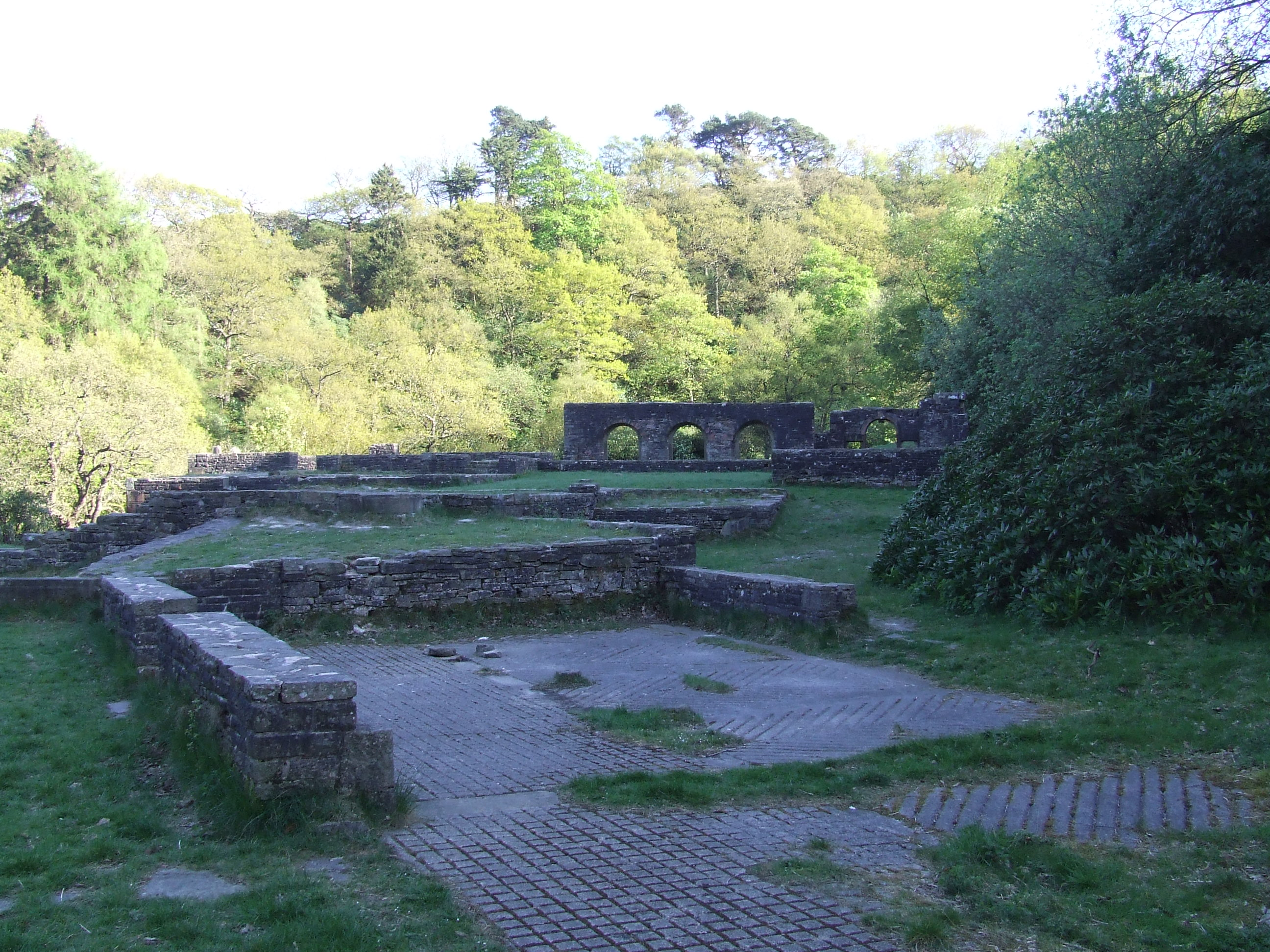
The Ruins

Of the hall, only the foundations to ground floor level, and a few sections of wall, now survive. These have been consolidated and are in the care of the Peak Park Authority. On a hilltop a few hundred metres to the west of the hall ruins is the family graveyard, restored by North West Water in the 1980s.

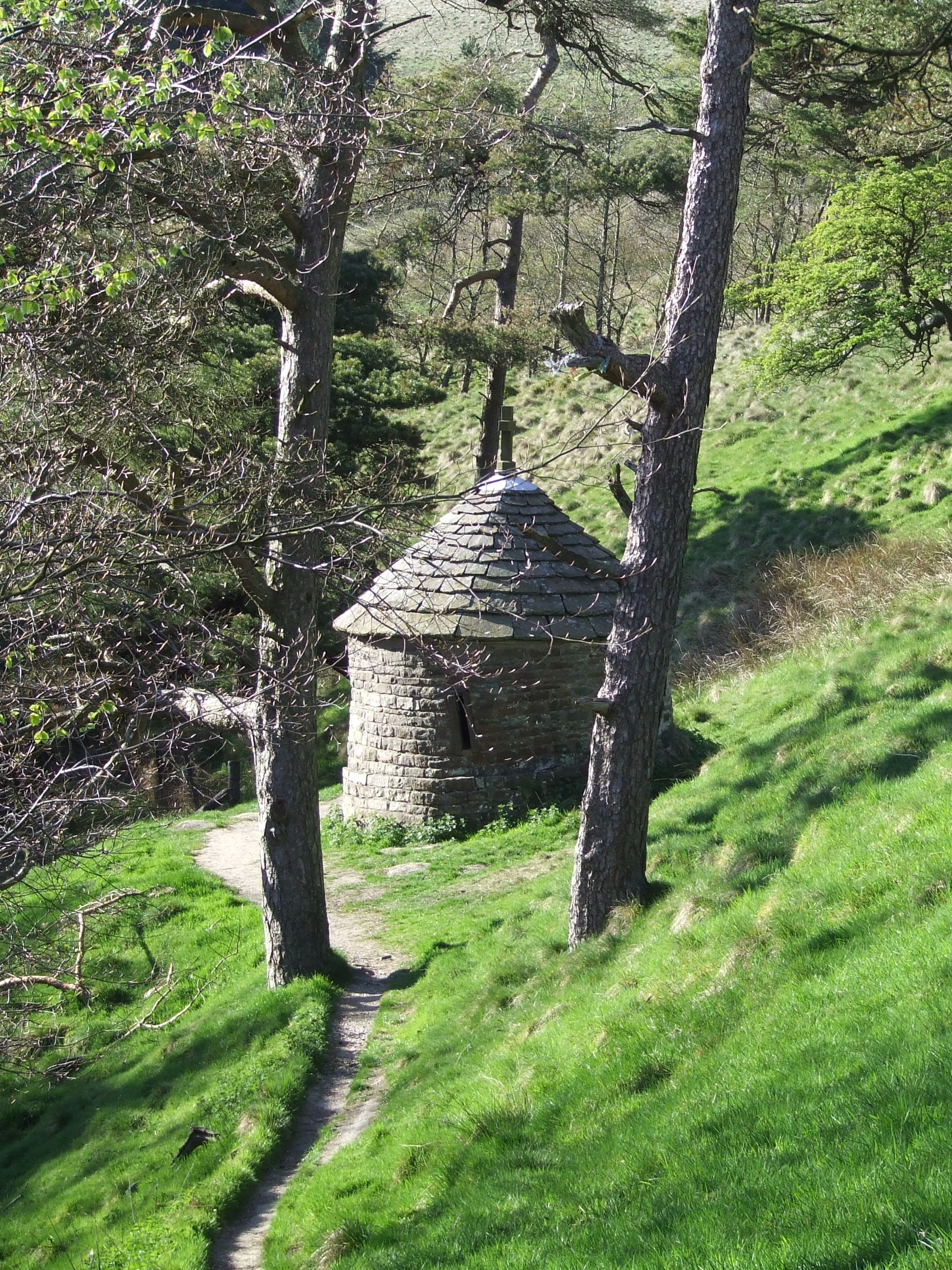
The Shrine

To the north of the hall is a small shrine or chapel, erected by the Grimshawe family to the memory of Miss Dolores de Ybarguen, a Spanish aristocrat who was the teacher at the estate school and governess to the Grimshaw family and who died on a visit to Lourdes. The shrine is still regularly used for private acts of devotion, intercession and remembrance.

The rhododendrons planted by the Grimshawes have flourished and now have to be strictly managed.

Goyt's Bridge and much of the farmland of the estate is now submerged under the waters of the Errwood Reservoir, though the old packhorse bridge after which the hamlet was named was relocated further up the valley.

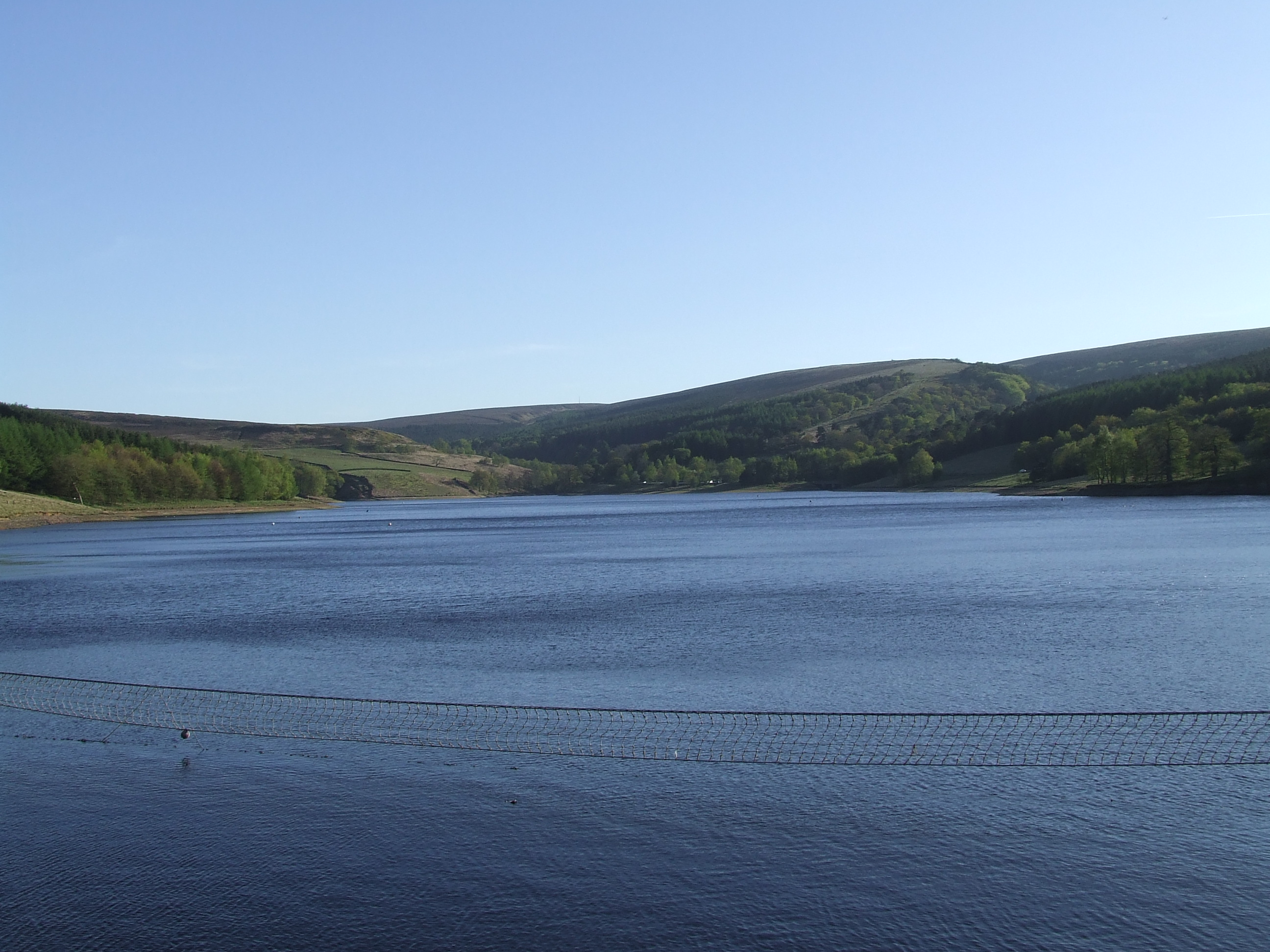
Errwood Reservoir

The hall and the surrounding area is one of the most visited parts of the Peak National Park, and is the starting point for many popular walks in the upper Goyt Valley. In recent summers it has also been the venue for a number of unofficial music festivals and rave parties.

== Literary reference ==
The hall is the scene of the climax of the fantasy novel The Moon of Gomrath by Alan Garner.
