= Upper Goyt Valley =

Valley in the Peak District of England

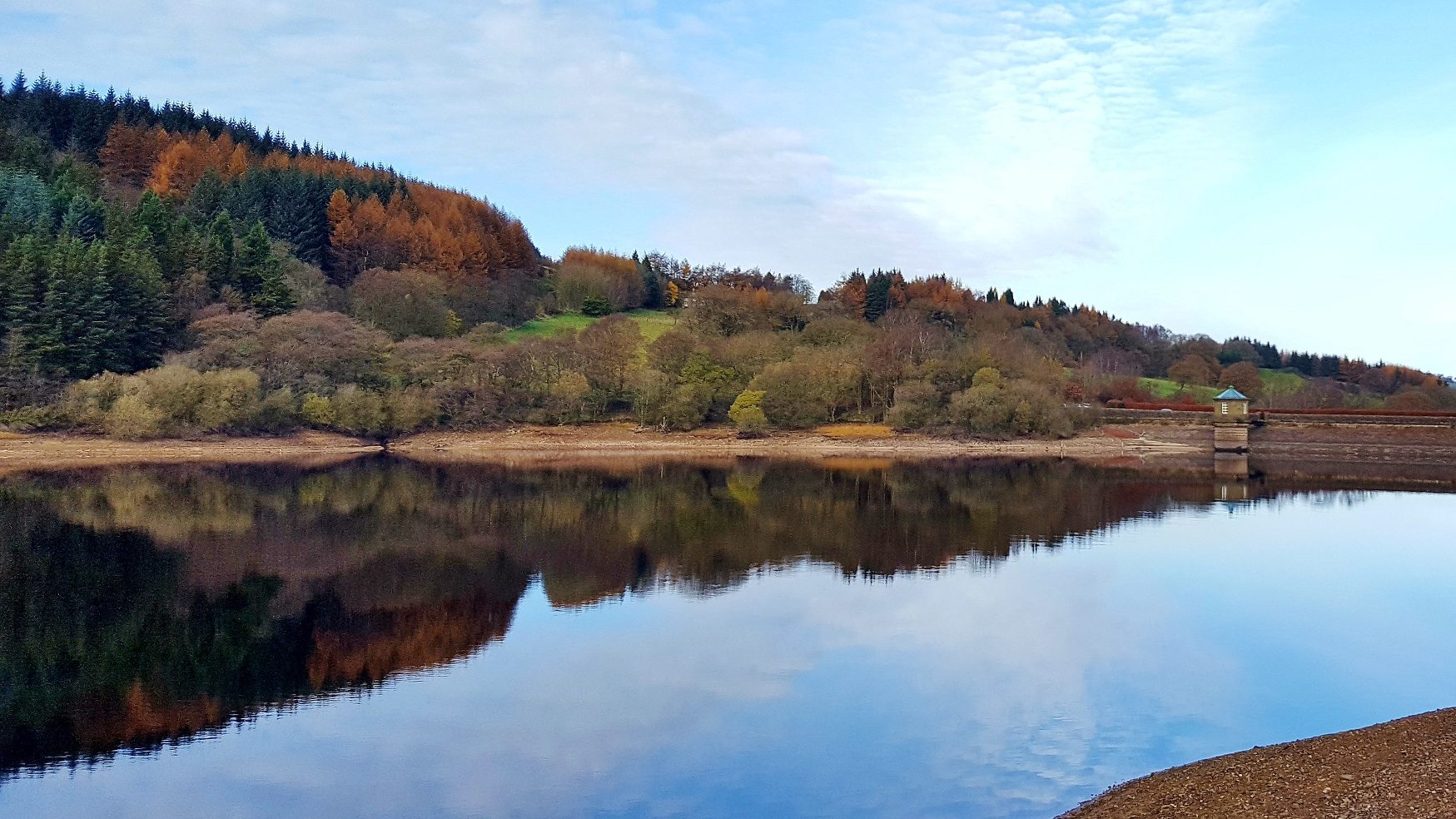
- Fernilee Reservoir in the Goyt Valley

Geography
- Location: Derbyshire and Cheshire, England
- Coordinates: 53.2965°N 1.9805°W
- Rivers: River Goyt
- Interactive map of Upper Goyt Valley

The Upper Goyt Valley is the southern section of the valley of the River Goyt in North West England.

== Position ==
The source of the Goyt River is on Axe Edge Moor above Goyt's Moss to the south. The western side of the valley is a long ridge, running from Shining Tor to Windgather Rocks, which forms the county boundary between Derbyshire and Cheshire; the boundary formerly followed the river itself. The eastern side of the valley rises to Burbage Edge, overlooking Buxton, and Combs Moss.

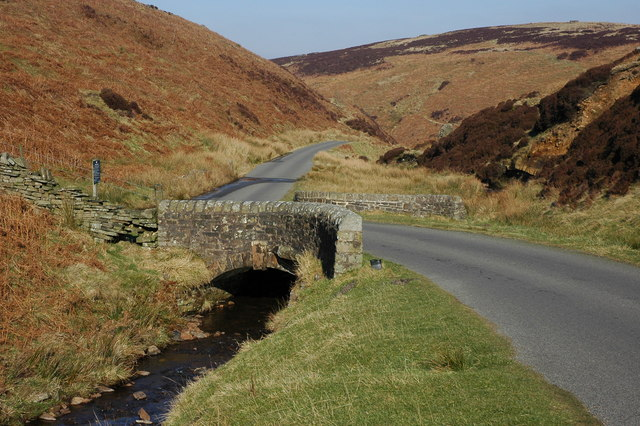
Derbyshire Bridge

The old stone Derbyshire Bridge gets its name from it being at the historic boundary from Cheshire into Derbyshire. The road south out of the Goyt Valley is one-way and crosses the bridge.

== History ==
The Street Roman road runs alongside Errwood Reservoir and to the west of Fernilee Reservoir.

The disused Cromford and High Peak Railway line (which connected the High Peak canal at Whaley Bridge with the River Derwent in Cromford since 1831) runs along the east side of the reservoirs. This stretch of the railway line was closed in 1896.

The Fernilee gunpowder mill operated in the valley from about 1800 at the site of Fernilee Reservoir. It was acquired in 1888 by Chilworth Gunpowder Company and expanded before closing in 1920, after numerous fatal accidents.

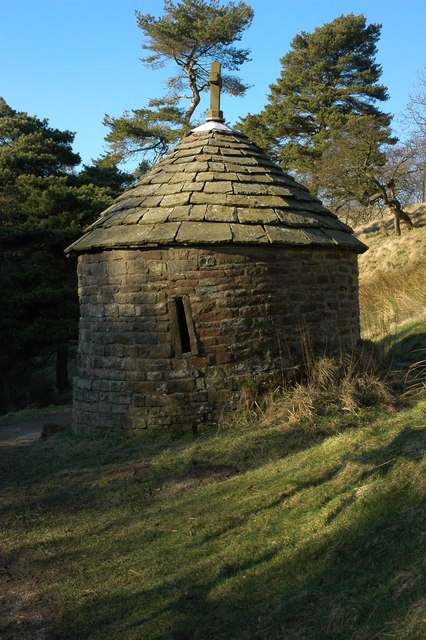
Spanish Shrine on Errwood Estate

Errwood Hall was the Victorian mansion of the Grimshawe family, built in about 1840 but it is now in ruins. Below Foxlow Edge there is a Spanish shrine, built in 1889 in memory of Miss Dolores (a friend of the Grimshawe family). The shrine is a designated Grade II listed building.

A local legend tells that Pym Chair is the spot where a highway man called Pym robbed passers by on the packhorse route. However another story is that Pym was a preacher who gave sermons there.

=== Reservoirs ===
The valley floor is now dominated by two drinking-water reservoirs, fed by the River Goyt. Both reservoirs were built by the Stockport Corporation Waterworks (after they acquired the Grimshawe estate) to provide drinking water for Stockport town and the surrounding area. Fernilee Reservoir was completed in 1938 and the hamlet of Goyt's Bridge and Errwood Hall were destroyed to prevent any pollution of the water. Errwood Reservoir was completed in 1967. A spectacular suspension bridge once crossed the river but it was demolished to make way for Errwood Reservoir. An old packhorse bridge was saved and reconstructed near Goytsclough Quarry. The reservoirs and much of the surrounding land is currently owned by United Utilities.

== Moorland ==
The open gritstone moorlands of the Upper Goyt Valley (Wild Moor, Goyt's Moss, Burbage Edge, Shining Tor to Cats Tor ridge and Hop Moor) are a designated Site of Special Scientific Interest (SSSI). Heather is the main plant but the heathland is habitat for a variety of native grasses, rushes, sedges and shrubs including bilberry, crowberry, cowberry and cross-leaved heath. Hare’s-tail cottongrass and sphagnum moss are common along the Shining Tor ridge. The area is important for upland breeding birds including a large population of golden plover, as well as red grouse, curlew, lapwing, whinchat, snipe, twite, ring ouzel and merlin. Along Goyt’s Clough (by the River Goyt from Derbyshire Bridge down to Errwood Reservoir) there are common sandpiper and dipper and the old commoner woodland includes oak, birch, rowan and alder.

== Tourism ==
The valley has been a popular tourist destination since the 19th century.

Errwood Sailing Club operates at Errwood Reservoir.

The Peak District Boundary Walk from Buxton follows the disused railway line into the Valley from the south east, crosses the Errwood Dam and then tracks along the west side of the Fernilee reservoir.

There are two large car parks in the central valley at The Street and Errwood Hall. There are smaller car parks at Derbyshire Bridge to the south and at the northern end of Fernilee Reservoir. There are extensive footpaths through the valley.

== See also ==
- List of Sites of Special Scientific Interest in Cheshire
- List of Sites of Special Scientific Interest in Derbyshire
