= Peak District Boundary Walk =

Long distance footpath in England

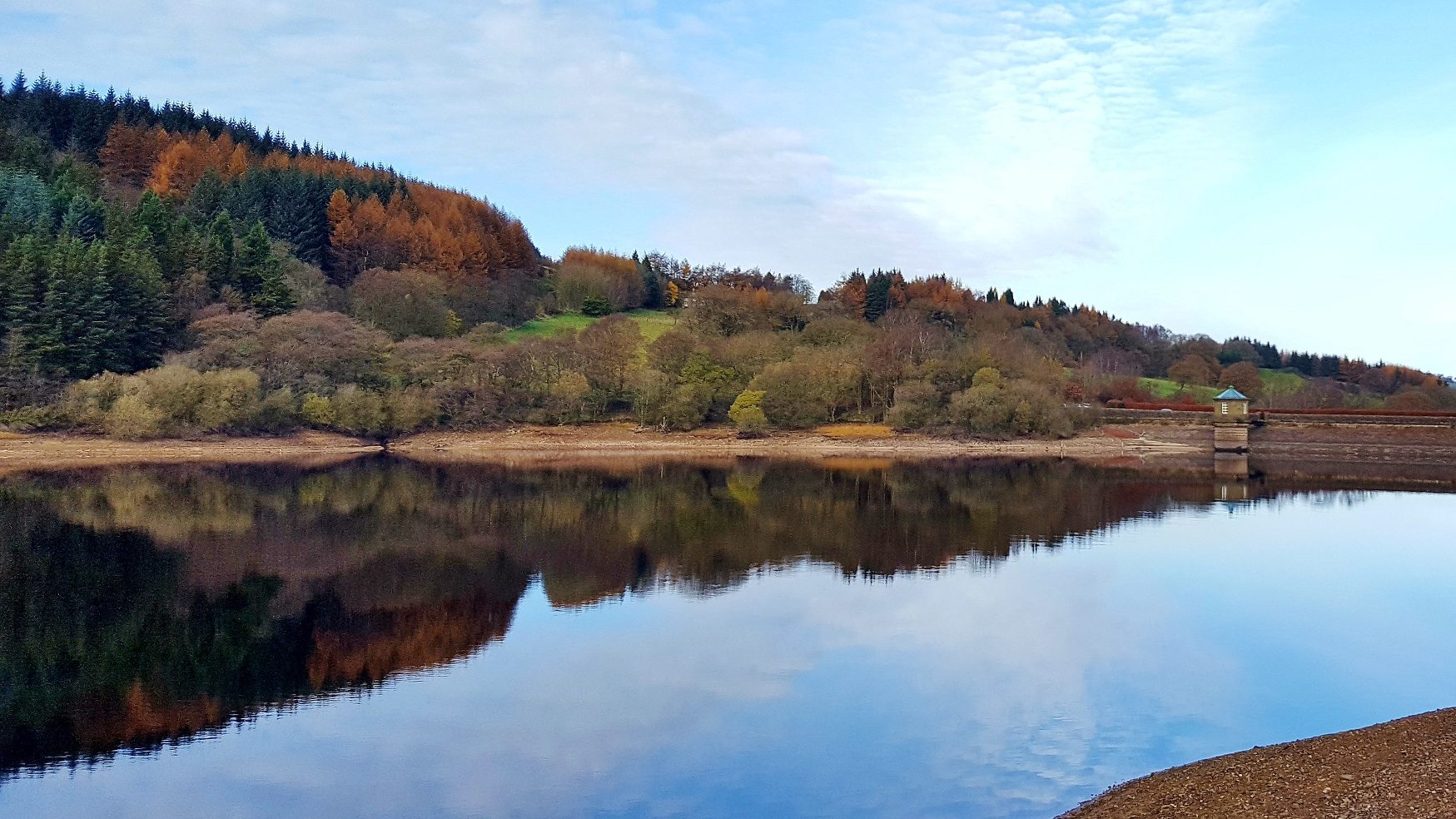
Fernilee Reservoir in the Goyt Valley

The Peak District Boundary Walk is a circular 190-mile (310 km) walking trail, starting and finishing at Buxton and broadly following the boundary of the Peak District, Britain's first national park. The route was developed by the Friends of the Peak District (a branch of the Campaign to Protect Rural England) and was launched on 17 June 2017.

The Friends of the Peak District's founders, Gerald and Ethel Haythornthwaite, proposed the boundary of the Peak District National Park, which was subsequently established as the United Kingdom's first National Park in 1951.

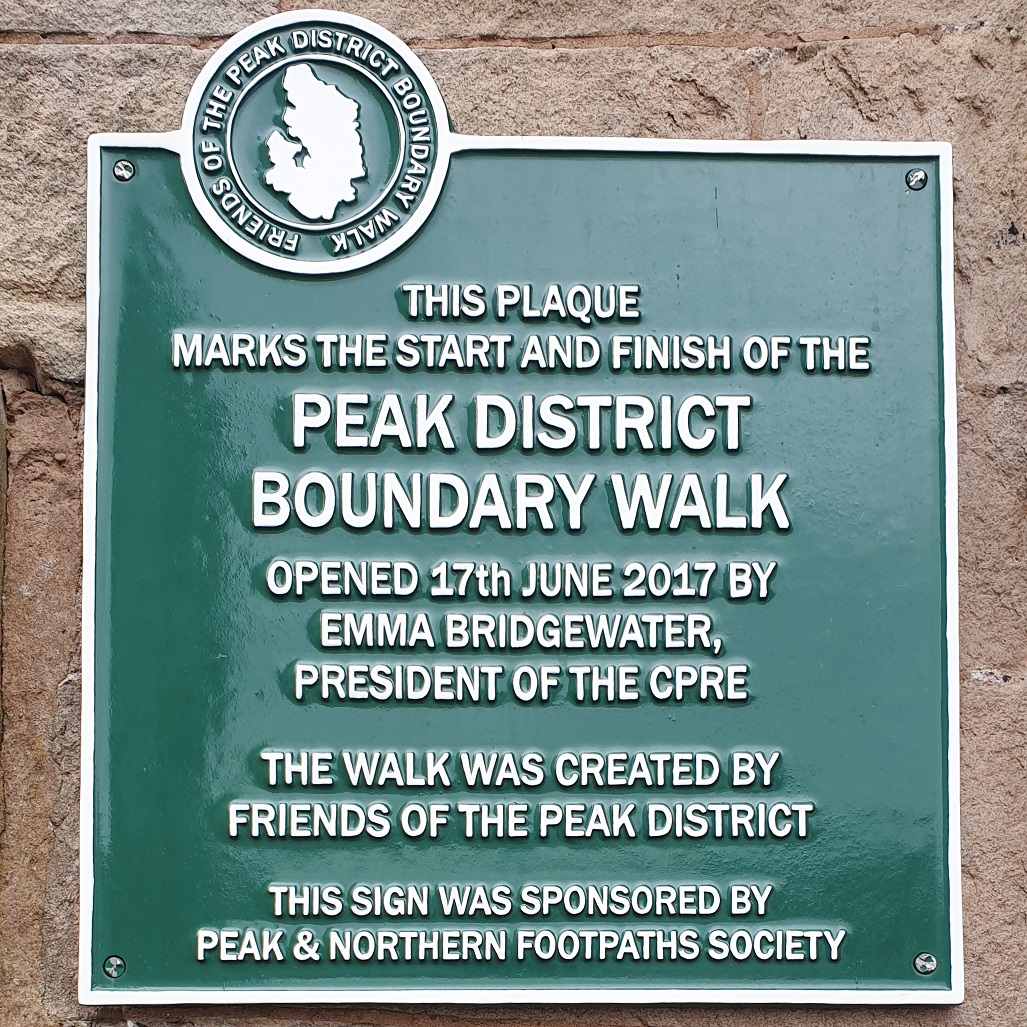
Peak District Boundary Walk plaque at King's Head pub, Buxton

The route is waymarked with green markers and uses existing footpaths, tracks, quiet lanes, disused railway lines and a canal towpath. The start and finish is at the King's Head pub on Buxton Market Place, where a plaque has been installed by the Peak & Northern Footpaths Society (PNFS). The terrain covers open moorlands of the South Pennines, the limestone scenery of the Derbyshire Dales, woodlands, reservoirs and rural farming countryside. Most of the trail is in Derbyshire but also goes through sections of Staffordshire, Cheshire and Yorkshire. The total ascent is 7,590 metres (24,900 ft) with a highest point of 506 metres (1,660 ft) at the summit of Shutlingsloe.

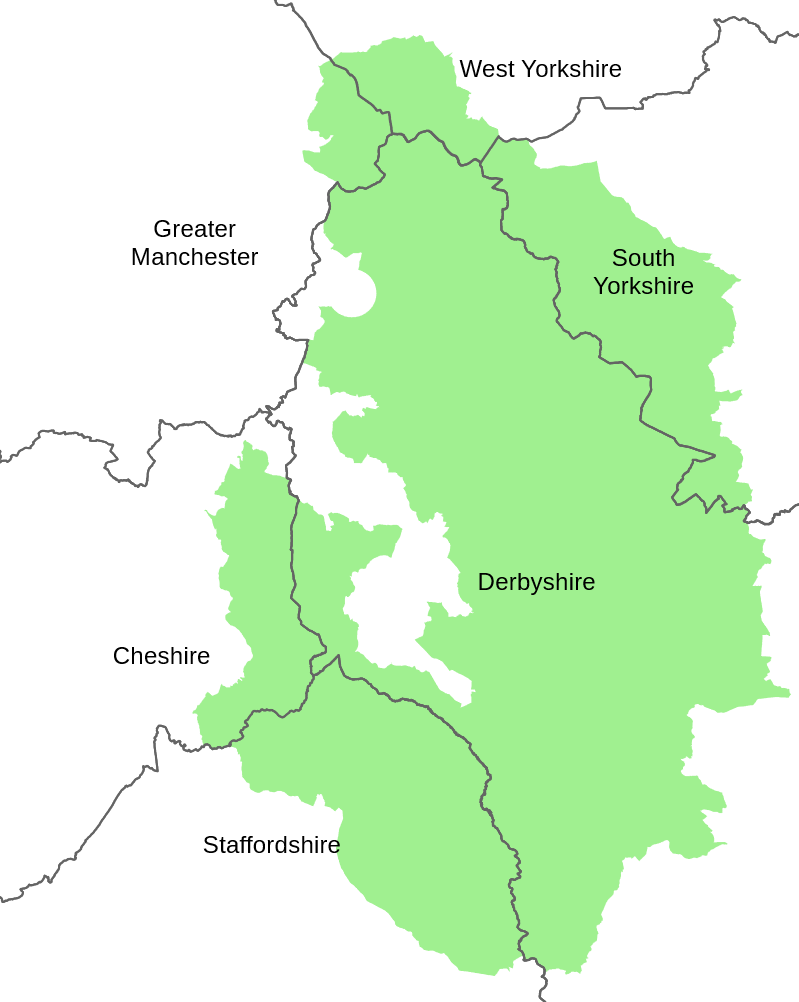
Peak District National Park

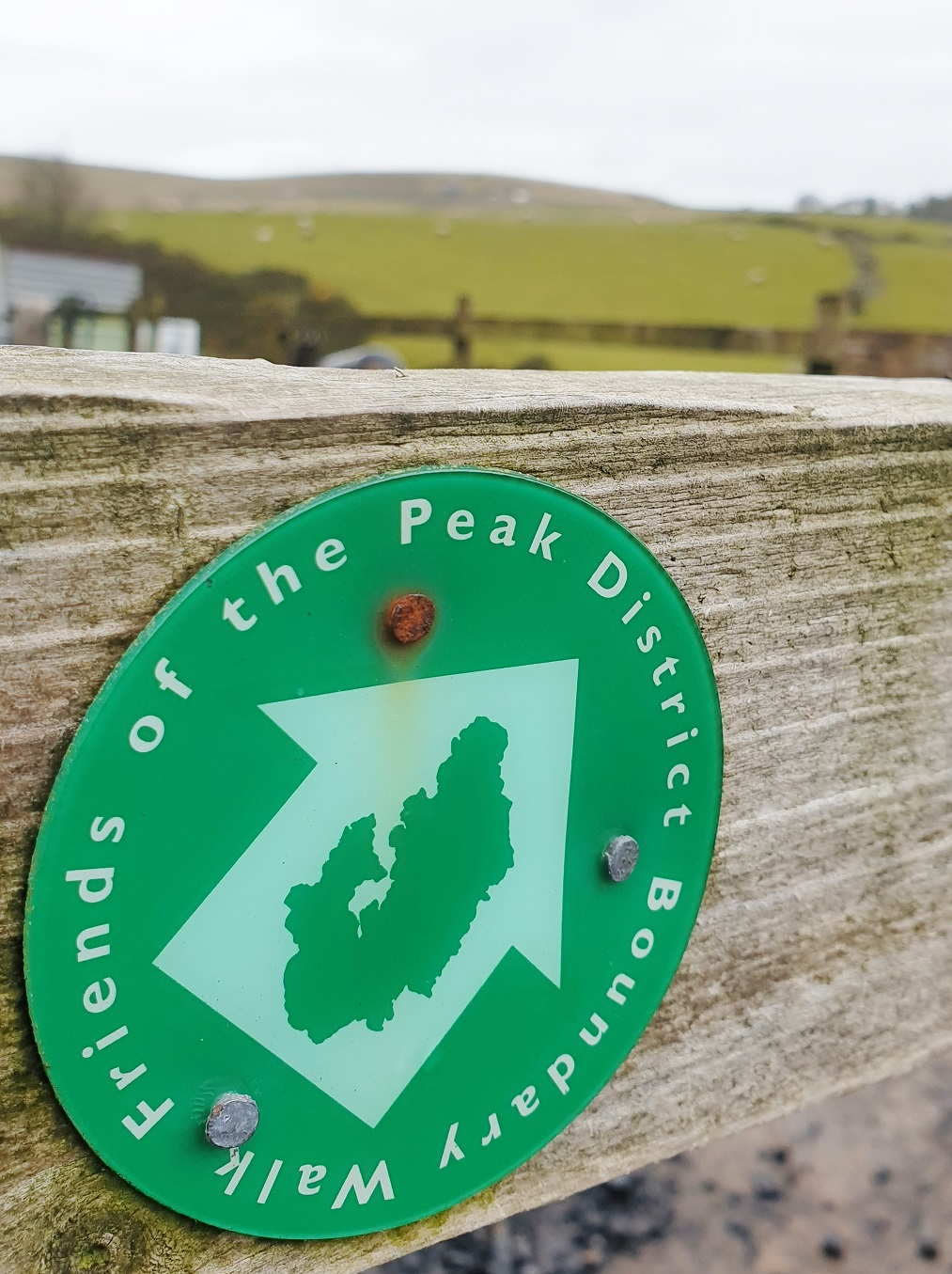
Peak District Boundary Walk Marker

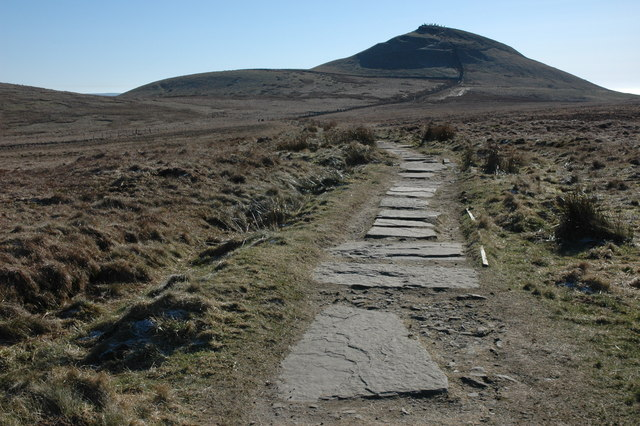
Shutlingsloe - highest point of walk at 506m

There is an official guide to the trail written by Andrew McCloy.

In August 2022, ultra runner Catharine Crossley completed the whole route in 3 days 11 hours and 21 minutes.

== Route stages ==
The trail is divided into twenty stages of about 10 miles (16 km) long, in a clockwise direction around the Peak District.

1. Buxton to Peak Forest

From Buxton market place, along the Midshires Way past Staden Low, through Cowdale, down Deep Dale, along the River Wye up to Chee Dale, through Wormhill, to the west of Peter Dale and through Hay Dale nature reserve to Peak Forest (10.2 miles/16.4 km).

2. Peak Forest to Hayfield

From A623 road at Peak Forest across fields to Blackbrook (on the outskirts of Chapel-en-le-Firth), heading north across farmland to reach and follow the Pennine Bridleway, past Mount Famine and along the River Sett into Hayfield (9.7 miles/15.6 km).

3. Hayfield to Glossop

Along the Sett Valley Trail west out of Hayfield, north along the Pennine Bridleway, over Lantern Pike hill, through Rowarth, along Cown Edge Way (over Cown Edge ridge and the top of Coombes Edge) into Glossop (9 miles/14 km).

4. Glossop to Greenfield (Dovestone Reservoir)

Past Swineshaw Reservoir, along the Etherow-Goyt Valley Way by Bottoms Reservoir, past Arnfield Reservoir along the Pennine Bridleway, between Higher Swineshaw and Lower Swineshaw reservoirs, over Swineshaw Moor, rejoining the Pennine Bridleway up to Dovestone Reservoir near Greenfield (9.8 miles/15.8 km).

5. Dovestone Reservoir to Marsden

Along the west wide of Dovestone Reservoir, along the Oldham Way over Pots and Pans hilltop, along Shaw Rocks ridge, across fields to the east of Diggle, joining the Pennine Way over the moors, past Brun Clough and Black Moss, Swellands and Wessenden reservoirs, along the hillside heritage trail above Butterley Reservoir and down into Marsden (10.6 miles/17.1 km).

6. Marsden to Holme

Heading east from Marsden over Deer Hill Moss, past Deer Hill Reservoir, across fields and along lanes past Meltham, up Royd Edge and Harden Moss Road track, down to Digley Reservoir, across the dam, following the Kirklees Way into Holme (8.5 miles/13.7 km).

7. Holme to Langsett

Along the Kirklees Way from Holme over the dam between Ramsden Reservoir and Brownhill Reservoir, up Crow Hill, along the Holme Valley Circular Walk across forested hillside, down the east side of Winscar Reservoir, along the Trans Pennine Trail by the south side of the River Don, across to and along the wooded north shore of Langsett Reservoir to Langsett (10.5 miles/16.9 km).

8. Langsett to Low Bradfield

Out of Langsett village along Edge Cliff past Midhope Reservoir, across fields and along lanes to Bolsterstone, past the west end of More Hall Reservoir, across fields and along lanes to High Bradfield and Agden Reservoir, onto Low Bradfield (10.5 miles/16.9 km).

9. Low Bradfield to Ringinglow

Along the side of Damflask Reservoir, up lanes to and through Royds Clough woods, over the A57 road, through Wyming Brook nature reserve, through woods above Rivelin Dams reservoirs, past Redmires Reservoirs, along paths and lanes to Ringinglow (9 miles/14 km).

10. Ringinglow to Millthorpe

Heading south along the Houndkirk Bridleway past woodland onto Houndkirk Moor, down through woods, up onto Totley Moor, along Brown Edge and Flask Edge, down a track off the moor, alongside Millthorpe Brook and along a lane and path through fields to Millthorpe (9.3 miles/15.0 km).

11. Millthorpe to Beeley

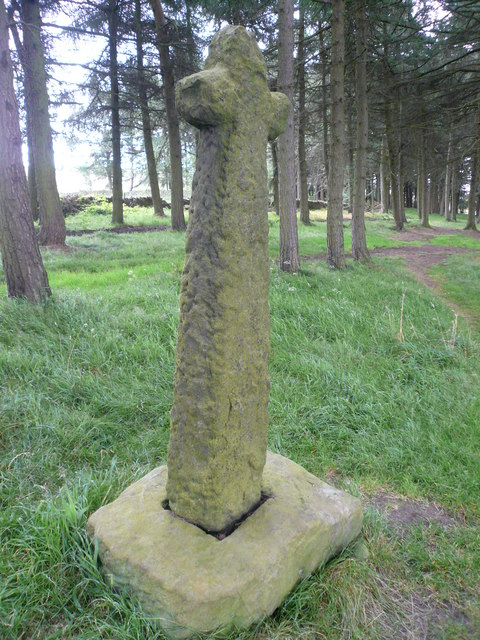
Stone Cross in Shillito Wood

Out of Millthorpe to the west then south through Shillito Wood past the ancient stone cross, across open moorland past Nelson's monument on Birchen Edge, along a track around Gibbet Moor past Hob Hurst's House burial mound, down a path by Beeley Brook into Beeley (10.6 miles/17.1 km).

12. Beeley to Winster

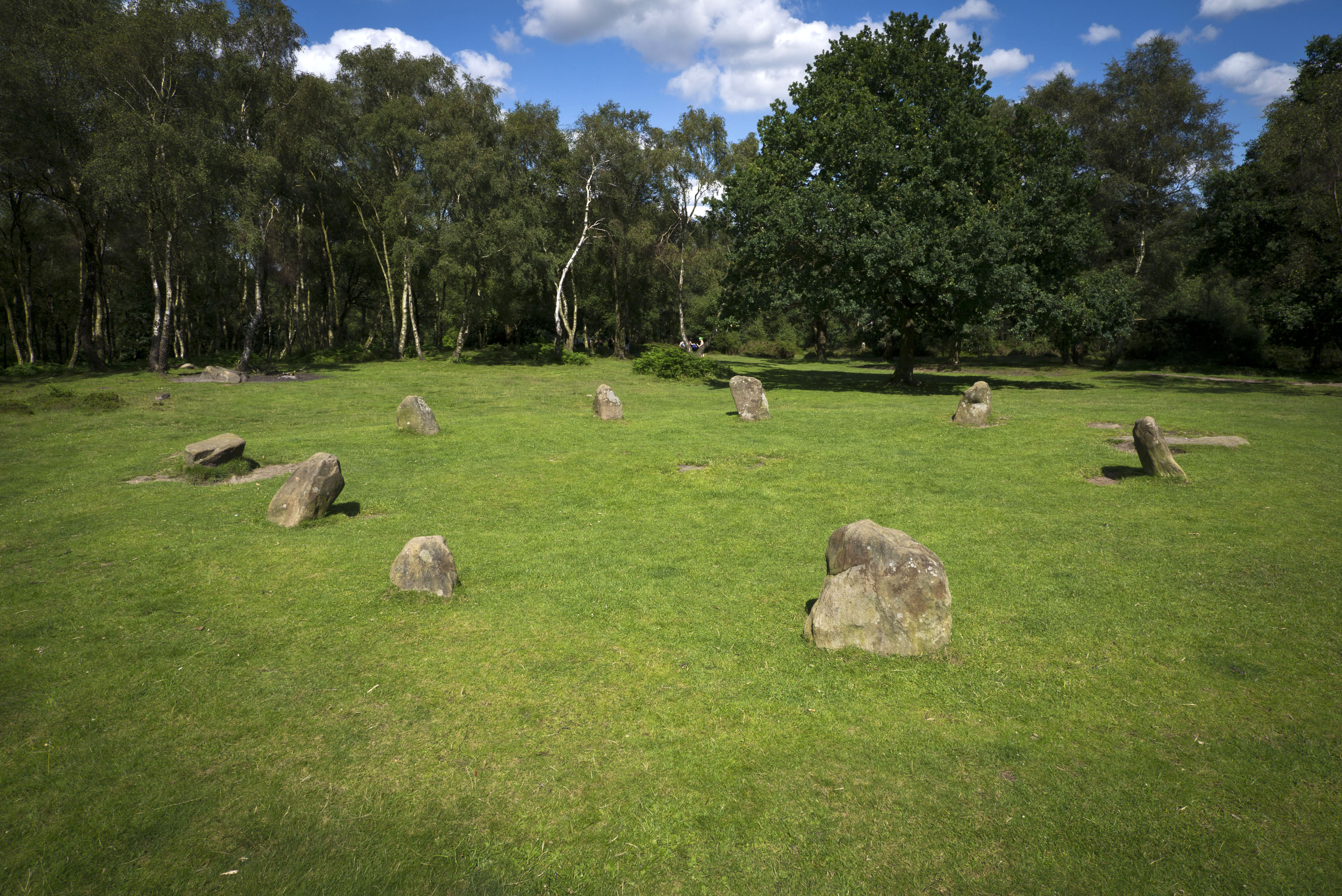
Nine Ladies Stone Circle

Up the hillside to woods overlooking Chatsworth Park, back down to cross the River Derwent and the River Wye at Rowsley, down the lane past Stanton Woodhouse and up to Nine Ladies stone circle, continuing across Stanton Moor, down a footpath into Winster (6 miles/9.7 km).

13. Winster to Roystone Grange

Along the Limestone Way across fields from Winster, over Bonsall Moor and into Bonsall village, rejoining the Limestone Way after Slaley through Grangemill and onto the Pennine Bridleway through Longcliffe to Roystone Grange. (10 miles/16 km).

14. Roystone Grange to Thorpe

Around Hoe Grange and Ballidon limestone quarries, through Parwich village, heading south across fields to Fenny Bentley, following a footpath over the hill, crossing the Tissington Trail, along the lane into Thorpe (7.7 miles/12.4 km).

15. Thorpe to Waterfall

Along the Limestone Way, crossing the River Dove from Derbyshire into Staffordshire, following the Manifold Trail along the river upstream through Ilam, over the footbridge and up past Musden Low hilltop and back down into Calton village, following the steep footpath down to the River Manifold, downstream along the Manifold Way to Waterhouses on the A523 road and north to the hamlet of Waterfall (8 miles/13 km).

16. Waterfall to Tittesworth Reservoir

Across fields to join the Hamps Way along the River Hamps, along a track over fields to Onecote village, heading north along a farm track over the hill beyond Mixon, along a minor road to the former Mermaid Inn on the Morridge, taking a footpath west down to Upper Hulme below The Roaches escarpment, along the Staffordshire Moors Walks to Tittesworth Reservoir (11.4 miles/18.3 km).

17. Tittesworth Reservoir to Wildboarclough

Along a lane to Meerbrook across the reservoir, heading north up a footpath around the end of a ridge, across farmland to the River Dane, crossing a footbridge, following footpaths across hilly farmland, up the lane beside Clough Brook to Wildboarclough (10.1 miles/16.3 km).

18. Wildboarclough to Bollington

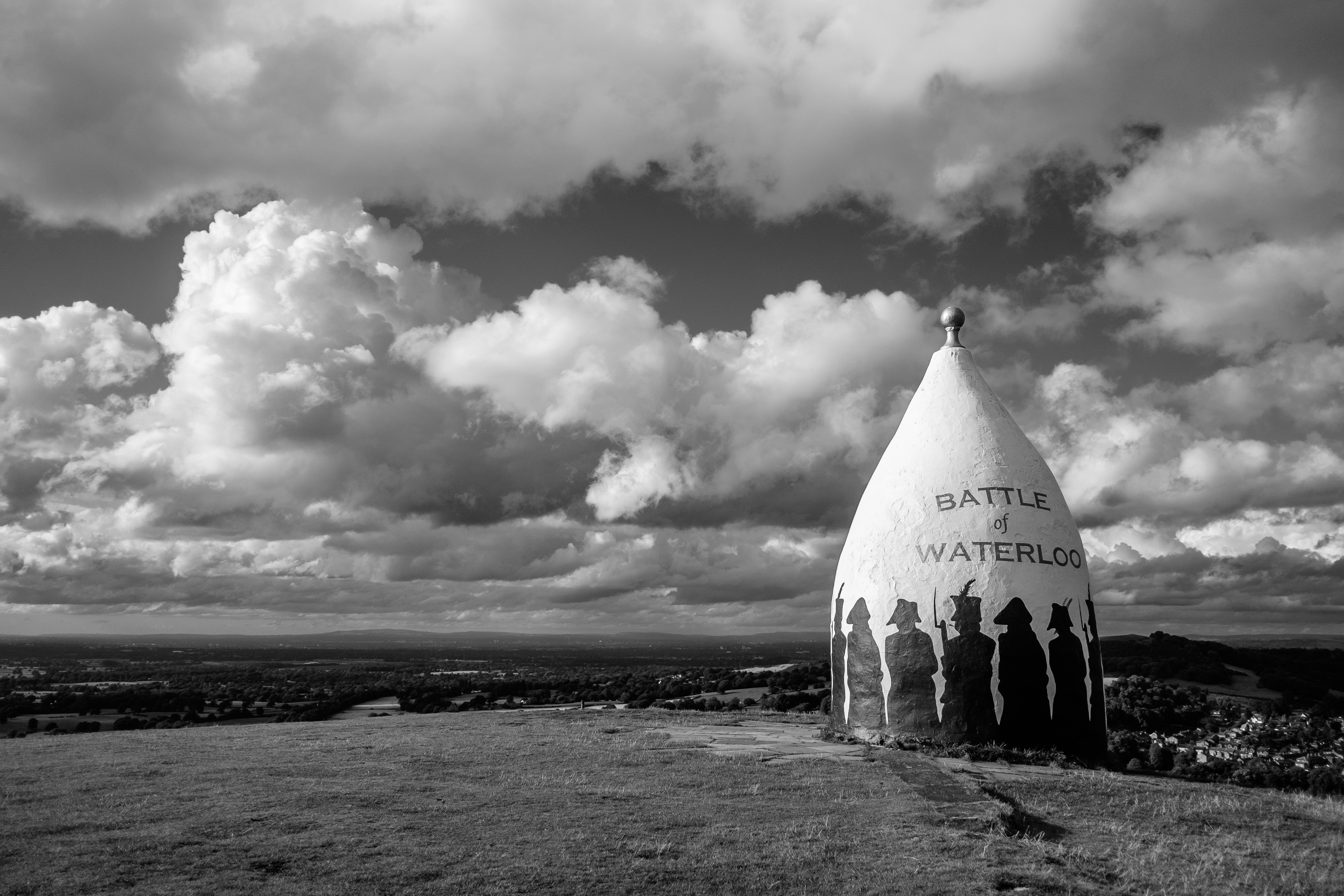
White Nancy with Battle of Waterloo theme

Up and over Shuttlingsloe hill summit (the highest point on the Boundary Walk), down the footpath into Macclesfield Forest, past Trentabank, Ridgegate, Bottoms and Teggs Nose reservoirs, along the Gritstone Trail up through Tegg's Nose country park onward to Rainow village and along Kerridge Ridge past White Nancy monument to Bollington (8.5 miles/13.7 km).

19. Bollington to Whaley Bridge

Rejoining the Gritstone Trail over Harrop Brook, following footpaths down to Macclesfield Canal, along the towpath before heading east into Lyme Park, over Higher Moor, across fields to Toddbrook Reservoir and into Whaley Bridge (9.5 miles/15.3 km).

20. Whaley Bridge to Buxton

Out of Whaley Bridge along the River Goyt, past Toddbrook Reservoir, along the Midshires Way before heading upstream alongside the River Goyt up to and along the west shore of Fernilee Reservoir, across Errwood Reservoir dam, along the disused Cromford and High Peak Railway line out of the Upper Goyt Valley, down across the Cavendish golf course, through Buxton Pavilion Gardens and up to the market place (9.2 miles/14.8 km).
