= Fernilee Reservoir =

Reservoir in Derbyshire, England

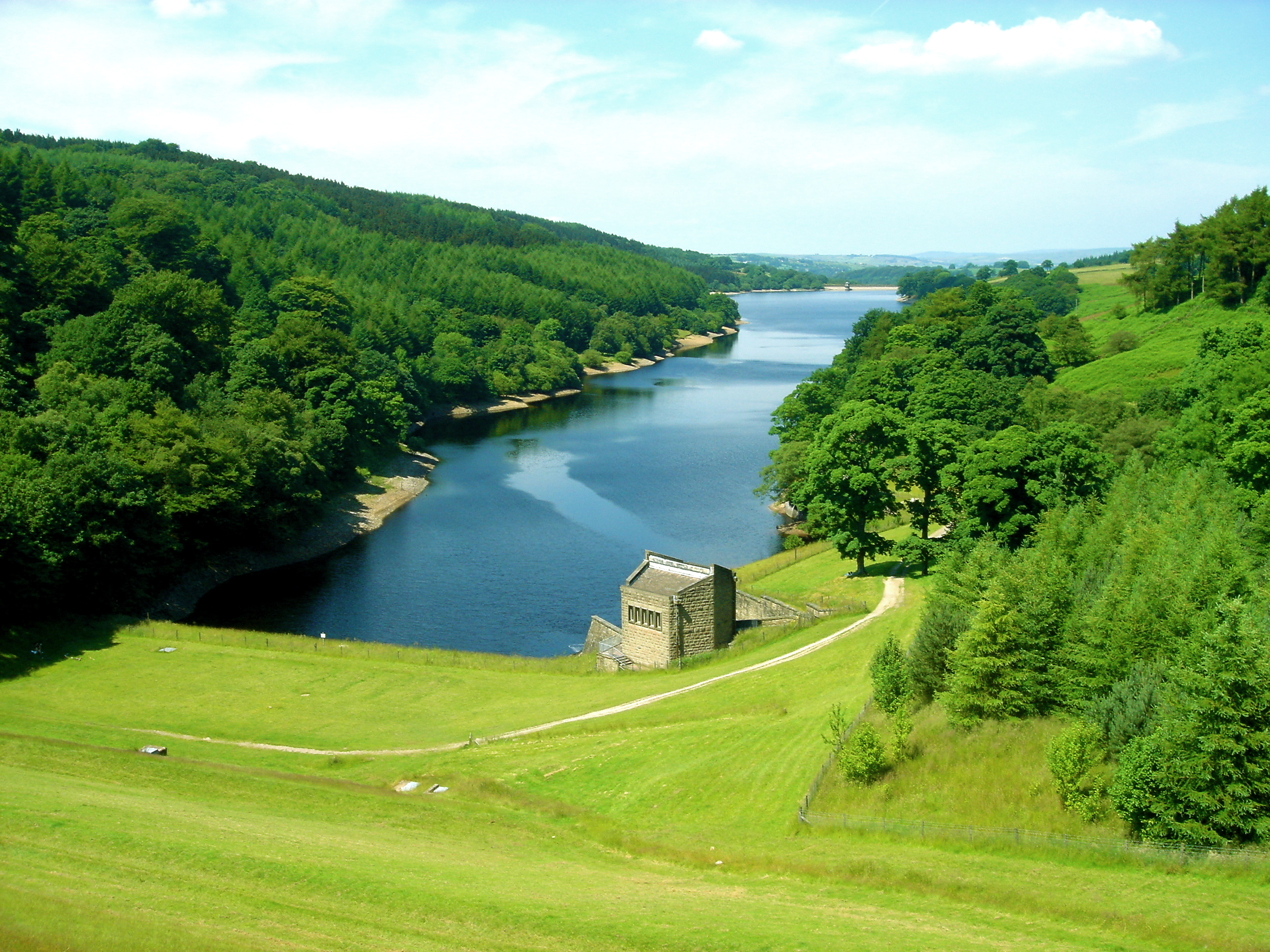

- Location within Derbyshire
- Location: Derbyshire
- Coordinates: 53°17′20″N 1°59′53″W
- Type: reservoir
- Basin countries: United Kingdom
- Max. length: 1.8 kilometres (1.1 mi)
- Max. width: 300 metres (984 ft)
- Max. depth: 38 metres (125 ft)
- Water volume: 5,000,000 cubic metres (176,573,334 cu ft)

Fernilee Reservoir is a drinking-water reservoir fed by the River Goyt in the Peak District National Park, within the county of Derbyshire and very close to the boundary with Cheshire. The village of Fernliee sits at the north end of the reservoir, with Goyt's Moss to the south and between Hoo Moor to the west and Combs Moss to the east.

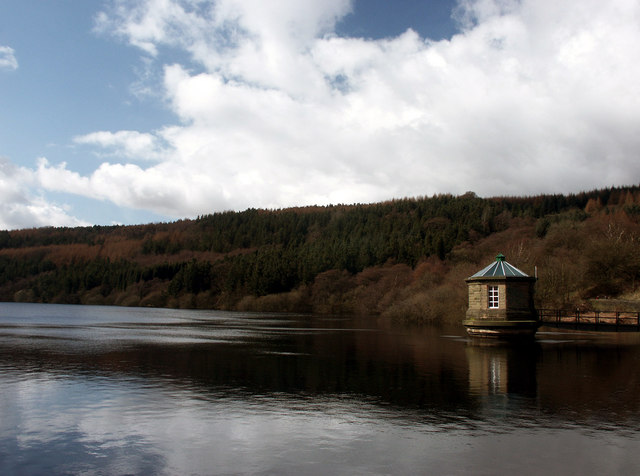
Sluice Tower at Fernilee Reservoir

It was inaugurated in 1932, following authorisation in the Stockport Corporation Act 1930 (20 & 21 Geo. 5. c. clxix), and construction was completed in 1938, costing £480,000. Its capacity is about 5 billion litres and is 38m deep. Local farming families were forced to leave their ancestral land. A 'Tin Town' corrugated iron temporary village was built near Fernilee for the navvy workers. The hamlet of Goyt's Bridge and Errwood Hall (the Grimshawe family mansion) were destroyed in the 1930s to prevent any pollution of the water running into Fernilee Reservoir. The reservoir was the first and lower of two reservoirs built by the Stockport Corporation Waterworks (after they acquired the Grimshawe estate) in the Goyt Valley, the other one being Errwood Reservoir. The Street Roman road runs alongside Errwood Reservoir and to the west of Fernilee Reservoir. Both reservoirs were built by Lehane, Mackenzie and Shand. The reservoir provides drinking water for Stockport town and the surrounding area. It is currently owned and operated by United Utilities.

The lower Toddbrook Reservoir at Whaley Bridge drains into the River Goyt but is fed from the Todd Brook stream.

The disused Cromford and High Peak Railway line (which connected the High Peak canal at Whaley Bridge with the River Derwent in Cromford) runs along the east side of the reservoir. This stretch of the railway line was closed in 1896.

The creation of the reservoir submerged the Fernilee Gunpowder Mill. It manufactured chemical explosives from the 16th century until World War I.

The Peak District Boundary Walk crosses the Errwood Dam at the head of Fernilee Reservoir and then tracks along the west side of the reservoir.
