= Linacre Reservoirs =

Reservoirs in Derbyshire, England

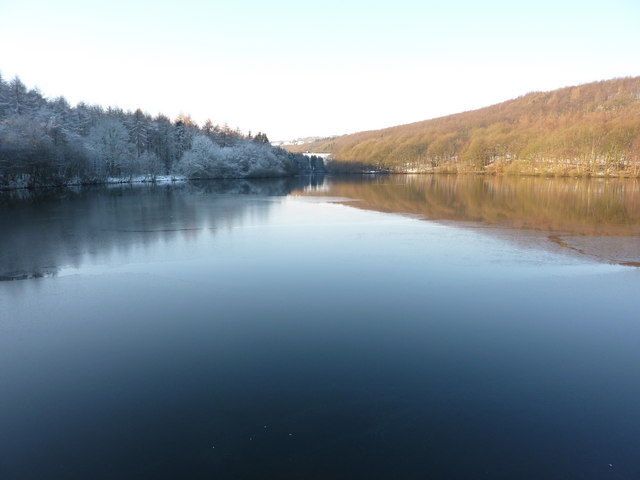
- Linacre Middle Reservoir

- Location within Derbyshire
- Location: Derbyshire
- Coordinates: 53.249°N 1.509°W
- Type: reservoir
- Primary inflows: Birley Brook
- Primary outflows: Linacre Brook
- Basin countries: United Kingdom
- Max. length: 1.5 kilometres (0.9 mi)
- Max. width: 250 metres (820 ft)
- Max. depth: 18.75 metres (61.5 ft)
- Water volume: 1,125,000 cubic metres (39,729,000 cu ft)

Linacre Reservoirs is a series of three reservoirs on the western outskirts of Chesterfield, Derbyshire. The village of Old Brampton lies 500m to the south of the reservoirs.

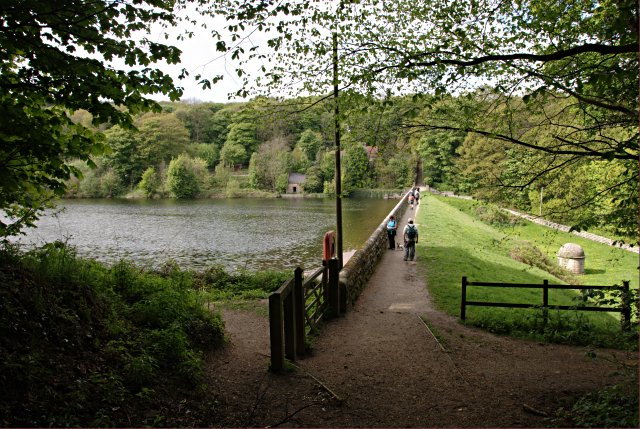
Linacre Lower Reservoir dam

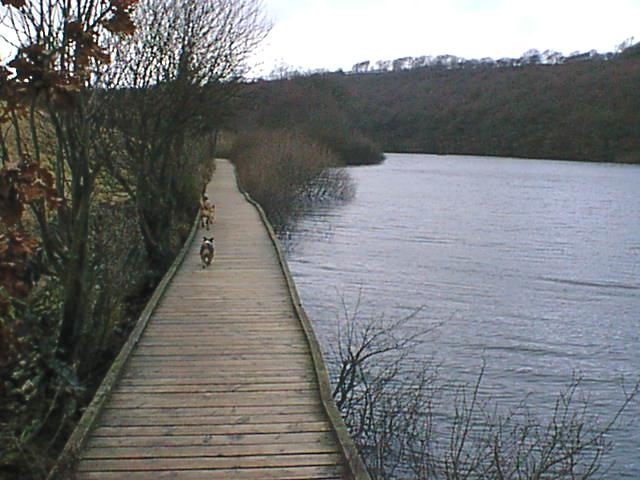
Linacre Upper Reservoir boardwalk

Linacre Lower Reservoir (storage capacity of 140 million litres, 9m deep) was built in 1855 following the Chesterfield Waterworks and Gaslight Company's Act 1855 (18 & 19 Vict. c. xxix) granting permission for its construction to supply drinking water to Chesterfield. Linacre Upper Reservoir was built in 1885 (capacity 575 million litres, 19m deep). Linacre Middle Reservoir was built in 1904 (capacity 410 million litres, 13m deep). From 1909 the public water supply was filtered through filter beds. Previously there were widespread complaints about its taste and odour, with a report that:

"The appearance of the public water supply was such that the poor used it as soup, the middle class for washing their clothes and the elite for watering their gardens."

They reservoirs ceased to be used for public water supply in 1995.

The reservoirs are currently owned and operated by Severn Trent Water.

There is a public car park on the edge of the woods to the north of the Lower Reservoir. There are walking trails around the reservoirs, including a boardwalk section along the Upper Reservoir. Cycling is not permitted on the reserve. The woods around the reservoirs contain oak, beech, alder, larch and pine trees. Bluebells cover the woodland ground in springtime. The woods are habitat for nuthatches, flycatchers and woodpeckers, whilst kingfishers and mandarin ducks live around the water's edge.

The earthwork remains of the 16th-century lead smelt mill in Linacre Wood (160m east of the Lower Reservoir) is a protected Scheduled monument.
