= Hurst Reservoir =

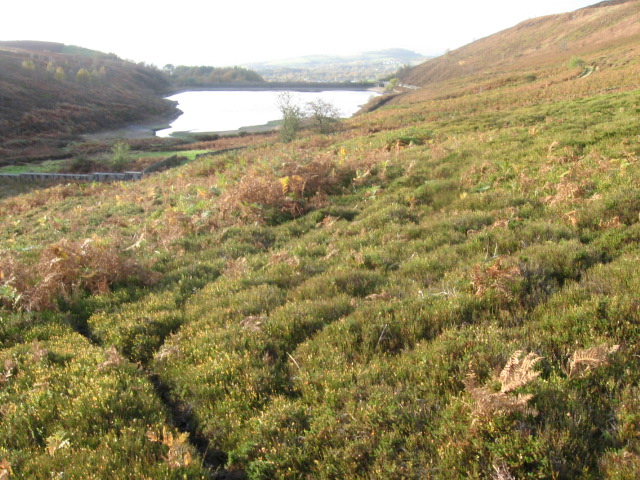
- Hurst Reservoir before it was decommissioned

- Location within Derbyshire
- Location: North Derbyshire, England
- Coordinates: 53°26′26″N 1°55′00″W
- Type: impounding reservoir
- Basin countries: United Kingdom

Hurst Reservoir is a former, now disused, reservoir near Glossop, north Derbyshire.

== History ==
In 1837, 50 local millowners and gentlemen, known as the "Commissioners of the Glossop Reservoirs", obtained an act of Parliament, the Glossop Reservoirs Act 1837 (7 Will. 4 & 1 Vict. c. lxxix), to construct the Glossop Reservoirs.

Hurst Reservoir was on the Hurst Brook and Mossy Lea Reservoir was to take water from the Shelf Brook. Only the Hurst Reservoir was constructed before the money ran out.

Mossy Lea Reservoir was later constructed privately by the Duke of Norfolk. His engineer and surveyor was John Frederick Bateman.

The reservoir was taken over in 1929 by the Glossop Corporation Waterworks. This became part of the Manchester Corporation Waterworks in 1959.

== Decommissioning ==
Swineshaw Reservoir, Hurst Reservoir, and Mossy Lea Reservoir are no longer in service.

Hurst Reservoir and Hurst Water Treatment Works stopped being used in 1997. In 2013, the Hurst Reservoir embankment was removed and the silt that had built up over the previous 175 years was dispersed within the Hurst valley. The reservoir was decommissioned because it had not been used for drinking water for 25 years and maintenance of the dam could no longer be justified. Following the removal of the embankment, a small pond (fire break) was retained to benefit wildlife, with the stream being returned to its original course. The former reservoir is next to Glossop and District Golf Club.

== See also ==
- List of reservoirs and dams in the United Kingdom
