= Kinder Reservoir =

Reservoirs in Derbyshire, England

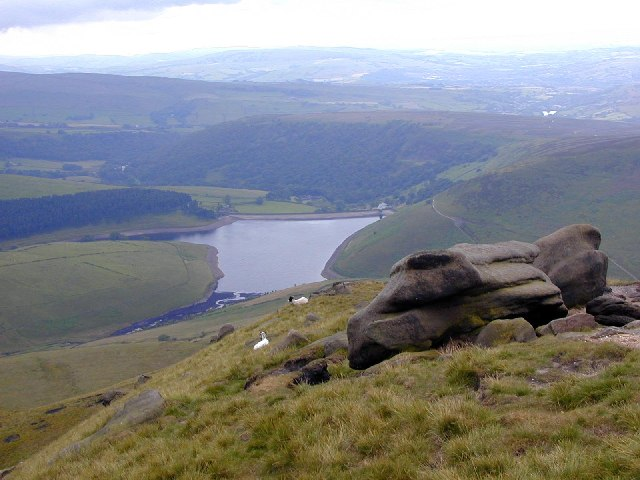
- View from Kinder Scout towards Hayfield

- Location within Derbyshire
- Location: Derbyshire
- Coordinates: 53.391°N 1.915°W
- Type: reservoir
- Primary inflows: River Kinder; William Clough stream
- Primary outflows: River Kinder
- Basin countries: United Kingdom
- Max. length: 0.8 kilometres (0.5 mi)
- Max. width: 500 metres (1,640 ft)
- Surface area: 180,000 square metres (18 ha)
- Water volume: 2,340,000 cubic metres (82,636,320 cu ft)
- Surface elevation: 278 metres (912.1 ft)

Kinder Reservoir is a public water storage reservoir on the western edge of Kinder Scout plateau in Derbyshire. The reservoir lies at the head of the Kinder Valley, 278 metres (912 ft) above sea level and 3 kilometres (1.9 mi) to the north east of the village of Hayfield. It is owned by United Utilities Group PLC.

== Details ==
The reservoir is fed by the River Kinder and by the stream flowing over several small cascades down William Clough valley, which is owned by the National Trust. The reservoir supplies drinking water and is currently owned and operated by United Utilities. The reservoir has a storage capacity of 2,340,000 cubic metres (510,000,000 imp gal) and a surface area of 180,000 square metres (44 acres).

Stockport Corporation engaged Abram Kellet of Ealing to build Kinder Reservoir, to supplement the local public water supply. The site above Hayfield was selected by engineer James Mansergh and the reservoir was constructed between 1903 and 1911. Difficulties with the geology led to a change in design in 1905 from a masonry dam to an earth dam. Following financial disputes in the courts, Stockport Corporation terminated its contract with Kellets and appointed G H Hill and Sons in 1908 to complete the construction. Two farms were abandoned to make way for the reservoir. Two Acts of Parliament approved the standard-gauge railway that was built to transport materials and navvy workers to the construction site. A small settlement of temporary huts developed for the workers and their families. The reservoir was officially opened on 11 July 1912.

The filter house (built beside the reservoir in c.1910) was decommissioned in 1996, when the water began being piped to the newly built Wybersley Water Treatment Works at High Lane, near Stockport. Despite the Kinder filter house being a "notable" example of early 20th-century municipal architecture, photographic evidence shows the present owners have allowed it to fall into disrepair.

There is a public car park on Kinder Road about 1.5 kilometres (0.9 mi) down the valley from the reservoir. Footpaths provide a circular walk of about 4 kilometres (2.5 mi) around the reservoir. The higher ground around the reservoir and Wiliam Clough are a heather moorland landscape.
