= Valehouse Reservoir =

Reservoir in Derbyshire, England

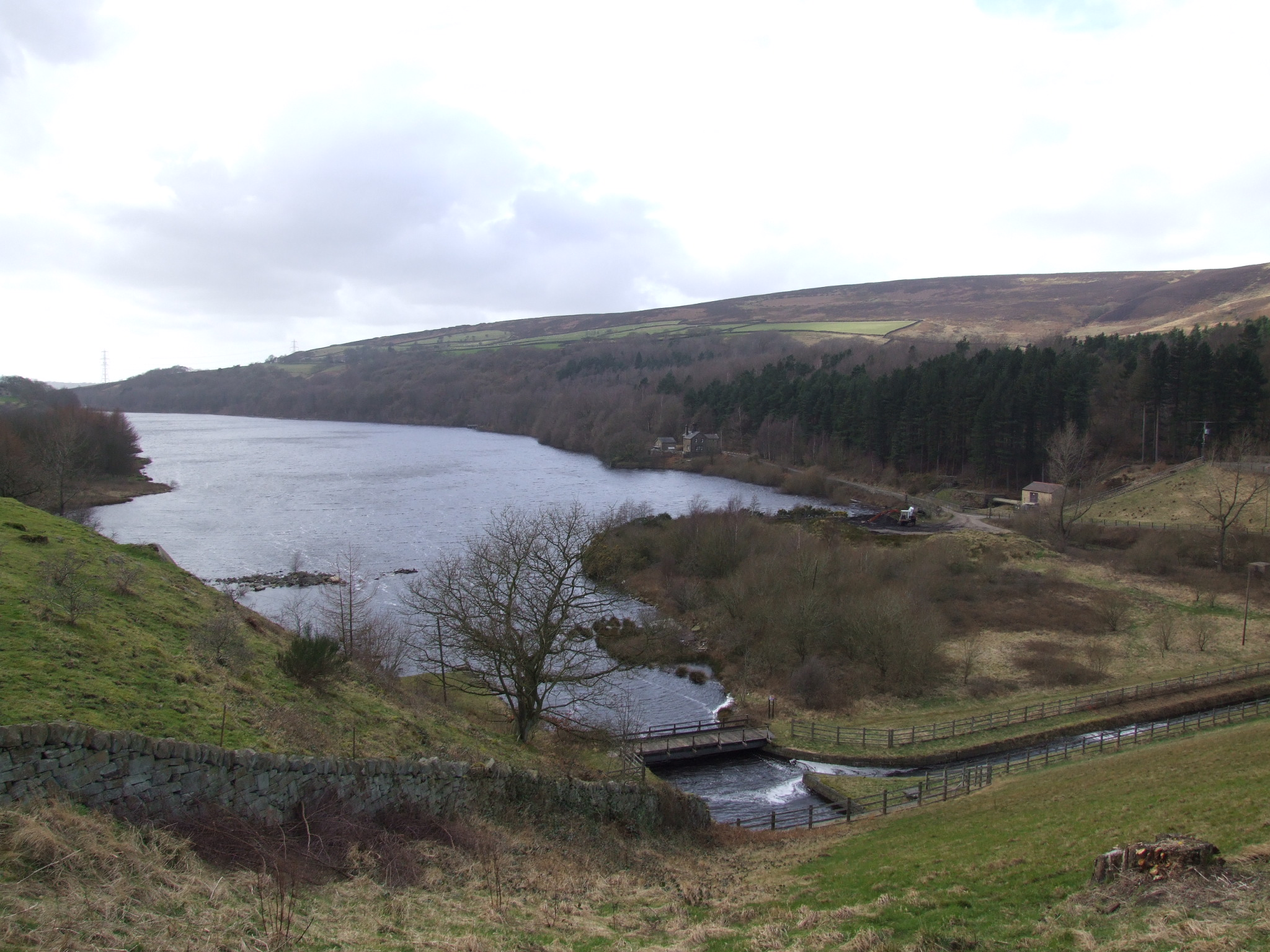
- From the Rhodeswood dam (March 2008)

- Location within Derbyshire
- Location: Derbyshire
- Coordinates: 53.476°N 1.947°W
- Lake type: compensation reservoir
- Primary inflows: River Etherow
- Primary outflows: River Etherow
- Basin countries: United Kingdom
- Surface area: 63 acres (25 ha)
- Max. depth: 40 ft (12 m)
- Water volume: 343×10^{6} m^{3} (12.1×10^{9} cu ft)
- Surface elevation: 503 ft (153 m)

Valehouse (or Vale House) Reservoir is a man-made lake in Longdendale in north Derbyshire, England. It was built between 1865 and 1869 as part of the Longdendale Chain of reservoirs, which was built to supply water from the River Etherow to the urban areas of Greater Manchester, while maintaining a constant flow into the river. The upper reservoirs supply the drinking water, while Vale House and Bottoms are compensation reservoirs which guarantee the flow of water to water-powered mills downstream. Valehouse, with a crest elevation of 153 metres (502 ft), is too low to supply water under gravity to the Mottram Tunnel, so could not be used as an impounding reservoir. Today 45 megalitres of compensation water are released each day into the River Etherow.

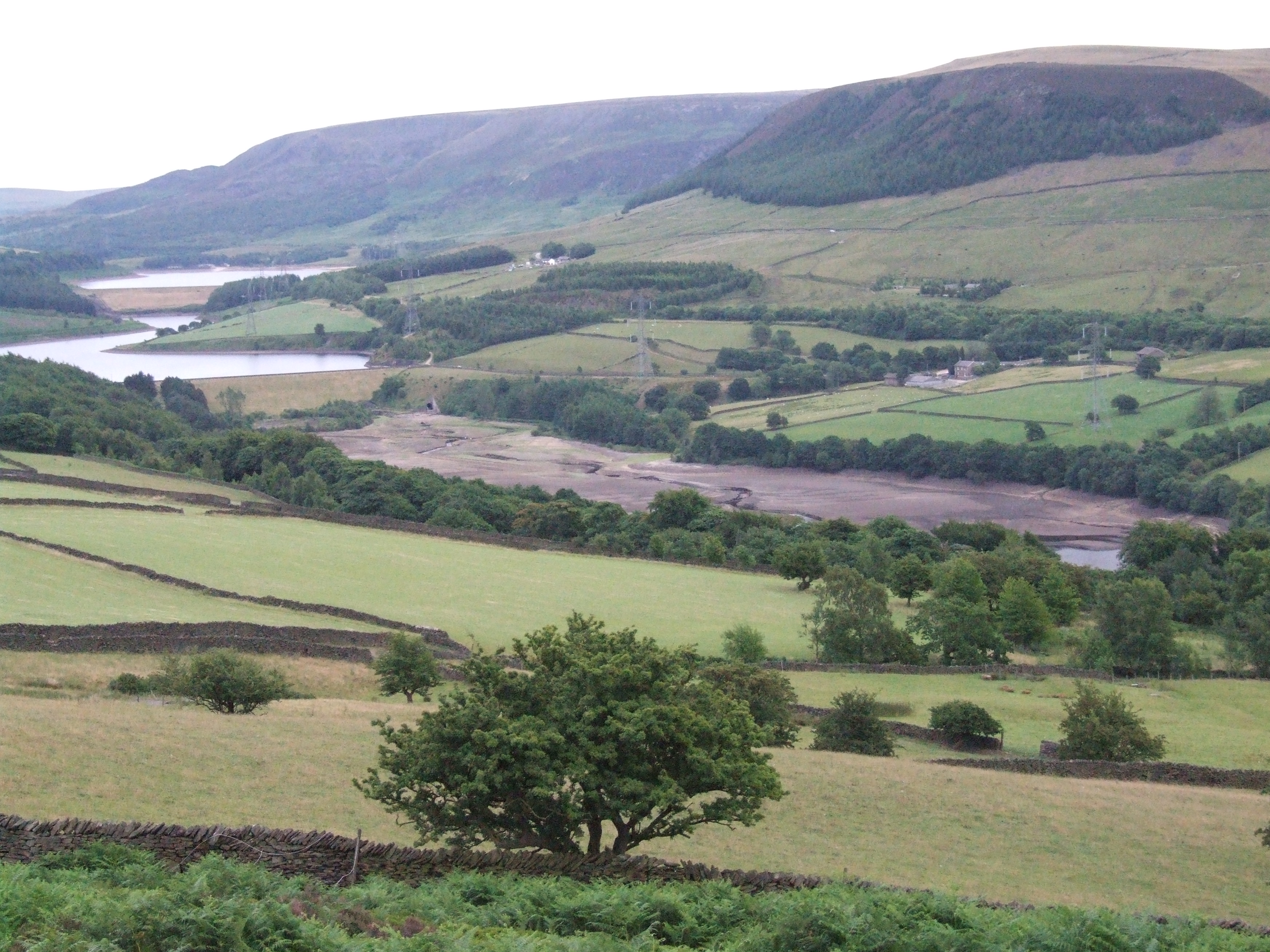
Valehouse Reservoir emptied in the drought of 2010

Vale House Mill was purchased by Manchester Corporation in 1864, but a few villagers remained in the village of Vale House until 1868. In 1869 the hamlet was flooded out. The village was substantial, having an estimated population of 600 houses and 100 cottages. There was a gasworks and a school house for 24-30 scholars. Vale House Mill was the first spinning and weaving mill in Longdendale; it was built in 1775 by Samuel Oldknow. In 1864, it was owned by William Hobbs and Co. It had two carding rooms, nine spinning rooms, three weaving rooms and two Blowing Rooms. It had 15,416 spindles and 326 power looms. Vale House residents worshipped at the Ebenezer Methodist Chapel in Tintwistle (built in 1830), which was above the reservoir.

The chimney at Vale House Mill survived the construction of the reservoir and became known as the "Whispering Chimney" as it produced ghostly noises during strong winds. It was demolished in 1887 at the request of the Manchester to Sheffield Railway Company, who feared for the stability of their trains when all the passengers crowded over to one side of a carriage to see the chimney protruding from the waters of the reservoir.

The puddle trench was dug to a depth of 35 feet (11 m) to a layer of lower millstone grit, which rested on limestone shales, and a good watertight seal was easily achieved.

It was stated in a statutory report, under the Reservoirs Act 1975, dated 12 June 1984, that all five reservoirs could be over-topped during a Probable Maximum Flood, so major works were undertaken. The retention level was raised by 3.81 m (12.5 ft), the embankment crest by 1.8 m (5 ft 11 in), and the wave wall was rebuilt. An 80-metre (260 ft) wide auxiliary spillway was constructed, two new 900-millimetre (35 in) butterfly valves installed and existing valves descaled and motorised. The 11 kV overhead powerline was routed in a new embankment crest duct.

== See also ==
- List of dams and reservoirs in United Kingdom

Preceded by Bottoms Reservoir	Longdendale Chain Reservoirs (West to East)	Succeeded by Rhodeswood Reservoir
