= Swineshaw Reservoir (Derbyshire) =

Swineshaw Reservoir and Upper Swineshaw Reservoir
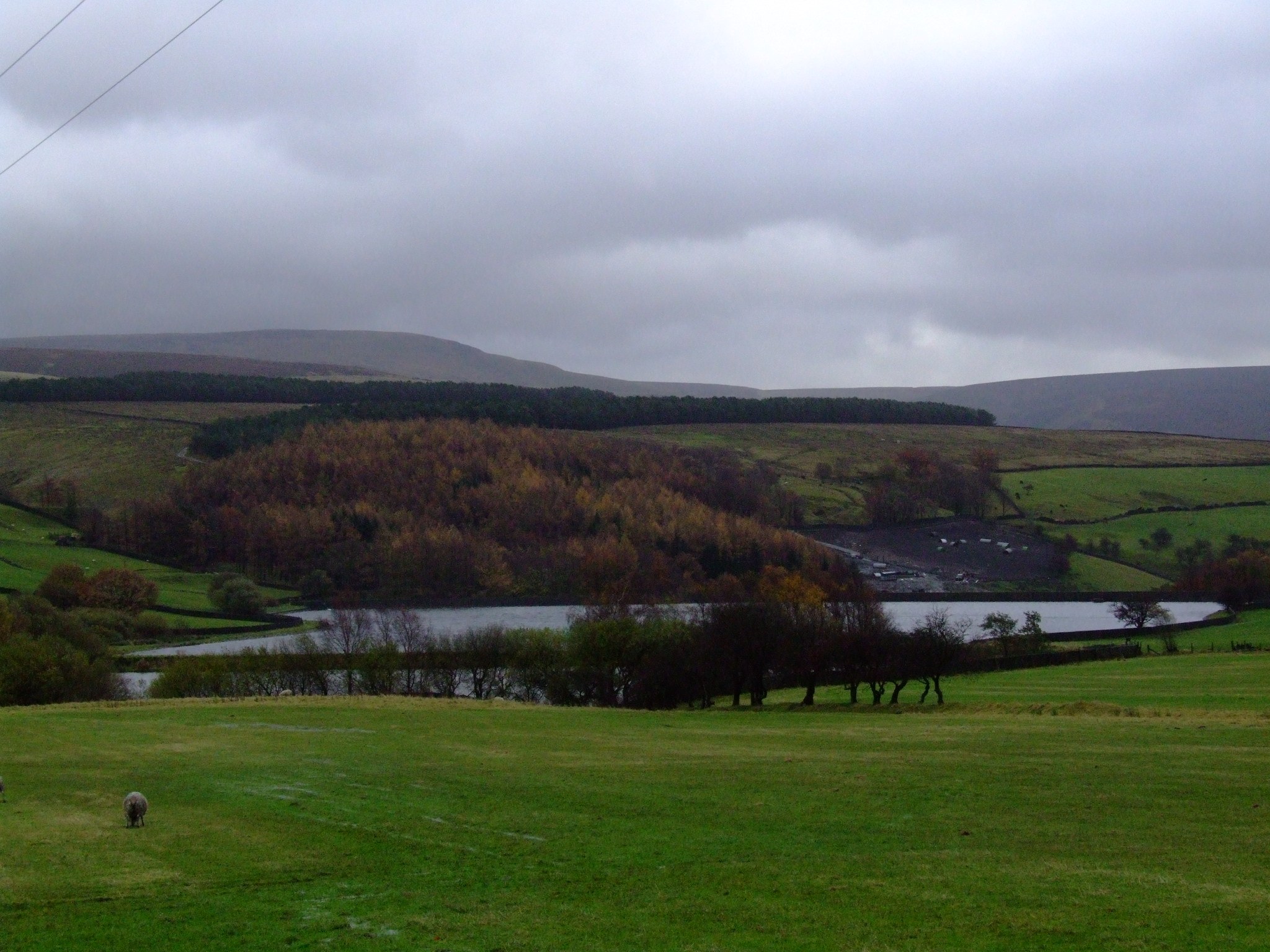
- (November 2008)

- Location within Derbyshire
- Location: North Derbyshire, England
- Coordinates: 53°27′31″N 1°56′13″W
- Type: impounding reservoir
- Basin countries: United Kingdom

Swineshaw Reservoir is a reservoir near Glossop, north Derbyshire. In 1837, 50 local millowners and gentlemen, known as the "Commissioners of the Glossop Reservoirs", obtained an act of Parliament, the Glossop Reservoirs Act 1837 (7 Will. 4 & 1 Vict. c. lxxix), to construct the Glossop Reservoirs.

Hurst Reservoir was on the Hurst Brook, and Mossy Lea Reservoir was to take water from the Shelf Brook. Only the Hurst reservoir was constructed before the money ran out.

Mossy Lea Reservoir was constructed privately by the Duke of Norfolk. Swineshaw, on Swineshaw Clough, was adopted in 1864 by the Glossop Water Company to provide drinking water for Glossop. It was taken over in 1929 by the Glossop Corporation Waterworks. This became part of the Manchester Corporation Waterworks in 1959.

Swineshaw Reservoir, Hurst Reservoir and Mossy Lea Reservoir are no longer in service.

The Peak District Boundary Walk runs past the south side of the upper reservoir.

== See also ==
- List of reservoirs and dams in the United Kingdom
