= Errwood Reservoir =

Reservoir in Derbyshire, England

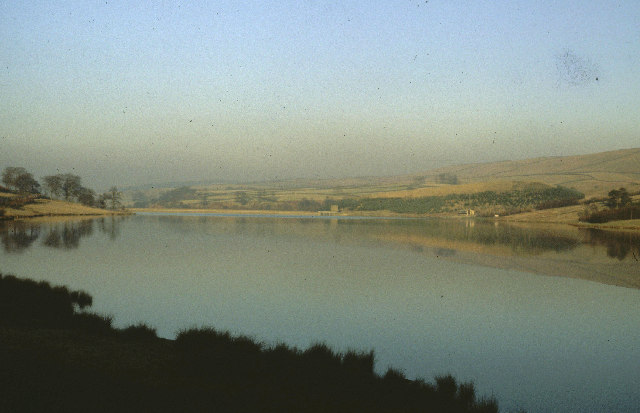
- (1979)

- Location within Derbyshire
- Location: Derbyshire
- Coordinates: 53°16′29.48″N 1°58′36.31″W
- Type: reservoir
- Basin countries: United Kingdom

Errwood Reservoir
- Location within Derbyshire
- OS grid reference: SK015753
- District: High Peak
- Shire county: Derbyshire
- Region: East Midlands
- Country: England
- Sovereign state: United Kingdom
- Police: Derbyshire
- Fire: Derbyshire
- Ambulance: East Midlands

Errwood Reservoir is a drinking-water reservoir in the Peak District National Park, within the county of Derbyshire and very close to the boundary with Cheshire. The reservoir was the second of two reservoirs built in the Goyt Valley, the other one being Fernilee Reservoir. It was authorised by the Stockport Corporation Act 1930 (20 & 21 Geo. 5. c. clxix) and constructed by the Stockport Corporation Waterworks at a cost of £1.5 million, with work being completed in 1967; it is currently owned and operated by United Utilities. The reservoir provides drinking water for the town of Stockport and its surrounding areas, and it holds 4,215 million litres (1.113×10^{9} US gal) of water.

Errwood Sailing Club uses the reservoir for sailing training/racing, and fishing rights are controlled by Errwood Fly Fishing Club.

The Peak District Boundary Walk runs across Errwood dam and passes above the eastern side of the reservoir.

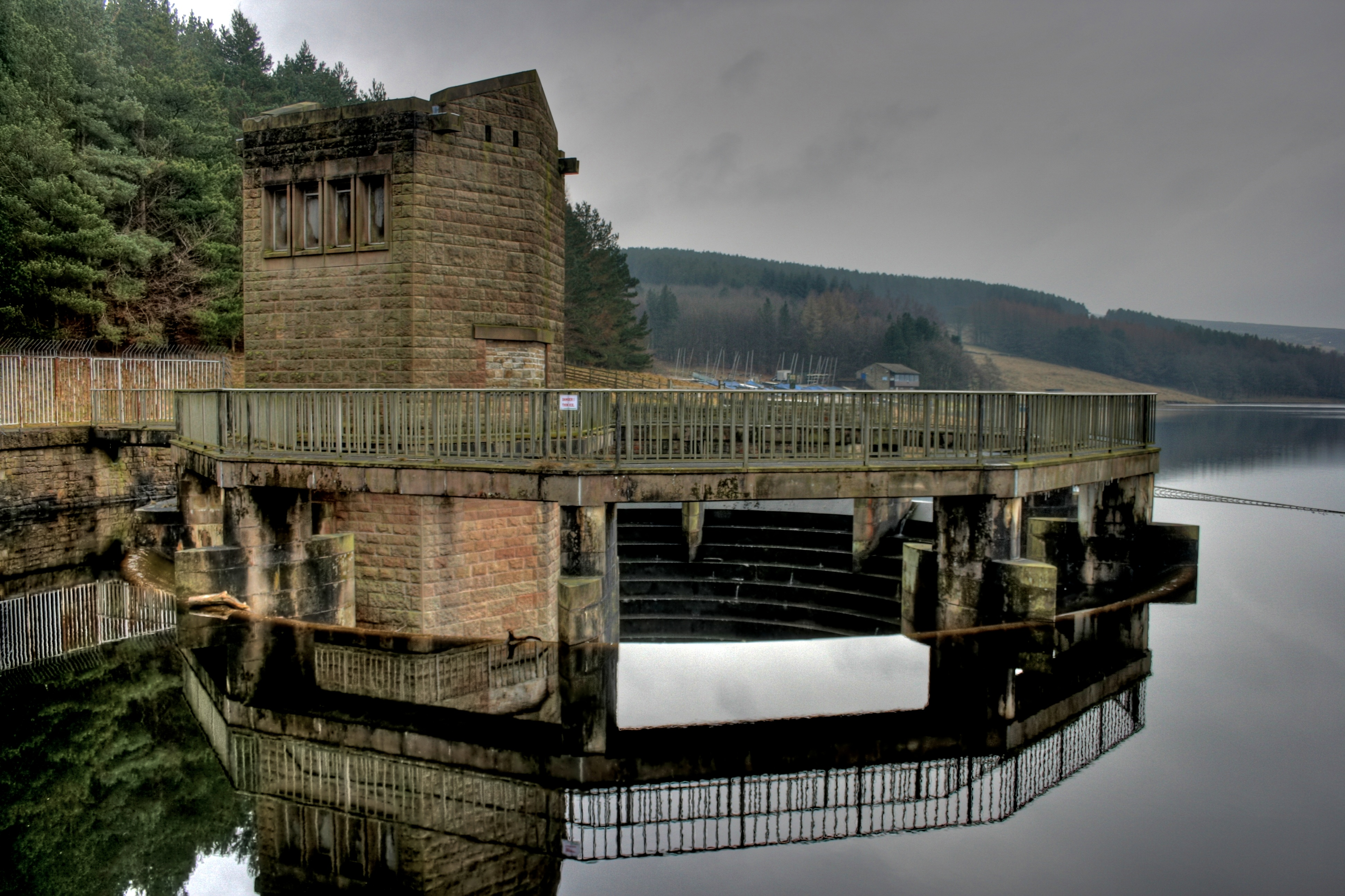
Errwood reservoir overflow

== See also ==
- Errwood Hall
