= Padfield =

Village in Derbyshire, England

Coordinates: 53.461°N 1.955°W

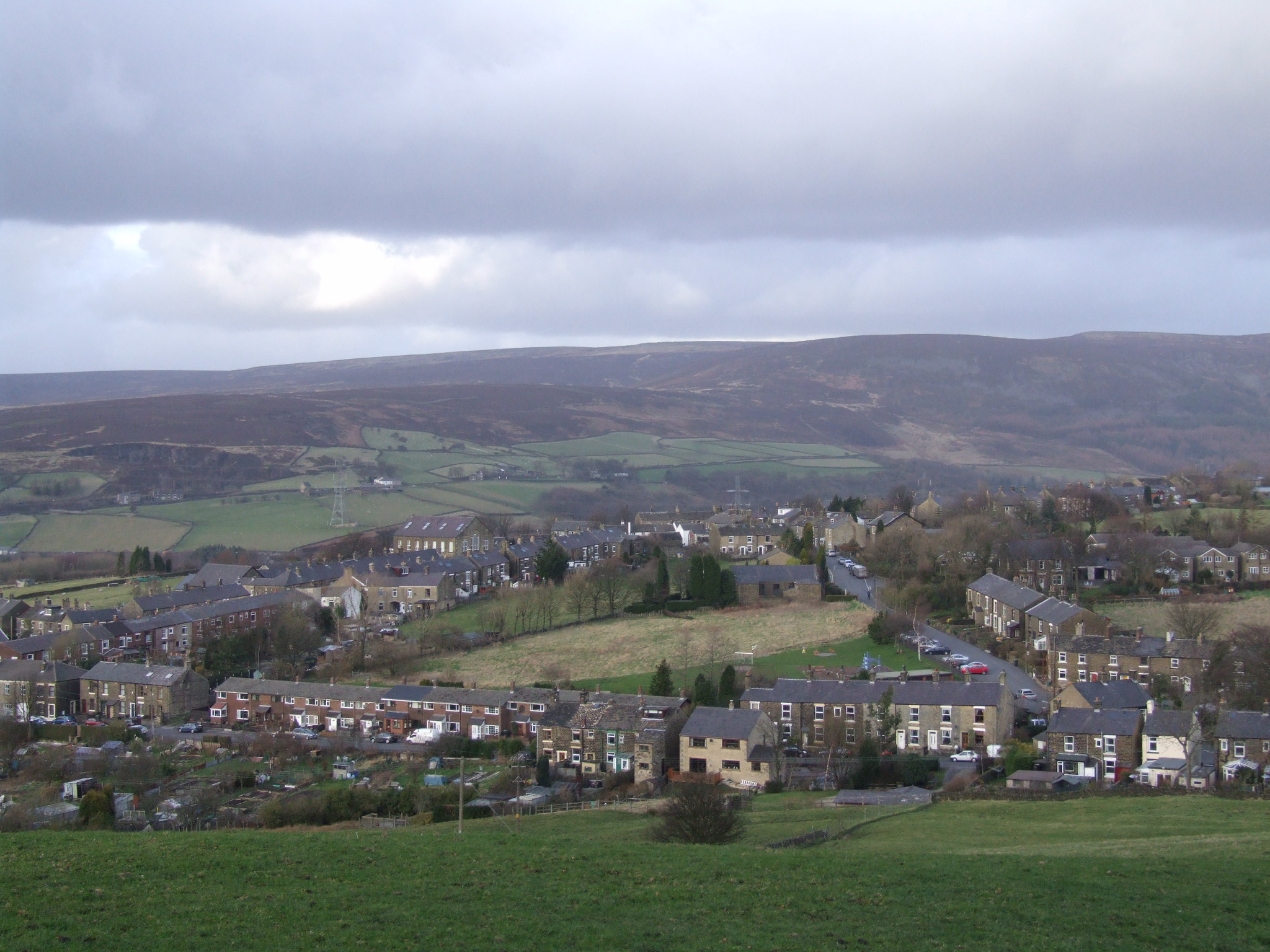
- Padfield from above

- Location within Derbyshire
- Population: 2,796 (Ward. 2011)
- OS grid reference: SK030961
- District: High Peak
- Shire county: Derbyshire
- Region: East Midlands
- Country: England
- Sovereign state: United Kingdom
- Post town: GLOSSOP
- Postcode district: SK13
- Dialling code: 01457
- Police: Derbyshire
- Fire: Derbyshire
- Ambulance: North West
- UK Parliament: High Peak

Padfield is a small village near Hadfield in High Peak, Derbyshire, England. The village is on the west side of the Peak District National Park, and the nearest town is Glossop, where many local amenities and services are based. It is in a conservation area. The population as of the 2011 census was 2,796.

== Geography ==
Padfield is a small hamlet in a small side valley on the southern side of the River Etherow valley, which is known as Longdendale, in the High Peak district of Derbyshire, England. It is between 560 and 690 feet (170 and 210 m) above sea level.

== History ==
Padfield was part of the Manor of Glossop, and at the time of the Domesday Book survey belonged to William the Conqueror. King Henry I granted the land to William Peveril. In 1157, King Henry II gave it to the Abbey of Basenwick. In 1537, King Henry VIII gave it to the Earl of Shrewsbury, whence it came to the Howard family (Dukes of Norfolk). The Howards were responsible in the 1810s for the development of Glossop. In 1828, the Wesleyan Methodists built a chapel in Padfield, and the Independent Methodist built one too. By 1851 Padfield had 328 houses and 2,051 inhabitants.

== Transport ==
The village is located within 1,100 yards (1,000 m) of Hadfield railway station, which is on the Glossop line. Operated by Northern Trains, services run through Dinting to Glossop and back through Dinting to Manchester Piccadilly.

The railway, formerly known as the Woodhead Line, used to run through Longdendale and the Woodhead Tunnel to Penistone and Sheffield. Passenger services were withdrawn in 1970 and goods trains ran until 1981, after which Hadfield became the terminus of the line.

The village is within close proximity of the Greater Manchester county boundary and some transport services are provided with this in mind. Though lying within Derbyshire and technically in the East Midlands, some of Padfield's transport facilities are managed by Transport for Greater Manchester, whilst Tameside and Glossop Acute Services, based in Tameside, Greater Manchester, is the NHS Trust that operates in the area.

Padfield is just off the B6105 road, which links with the A628 road, from Manchester to Barnsley and Sheffield, over the Woodhead Pass. The B6105 starts in Glossop, on the A57, which links Manchester to Sheffield over the Snake Pass.

== Recreation ==
The Longdendale Trail is a shared use path that follows the former trackbed of the Woodhead line to the Woodhead Tunnels.

The Peak District Boundary Walk runs through the north side of the village.

== Industry ==
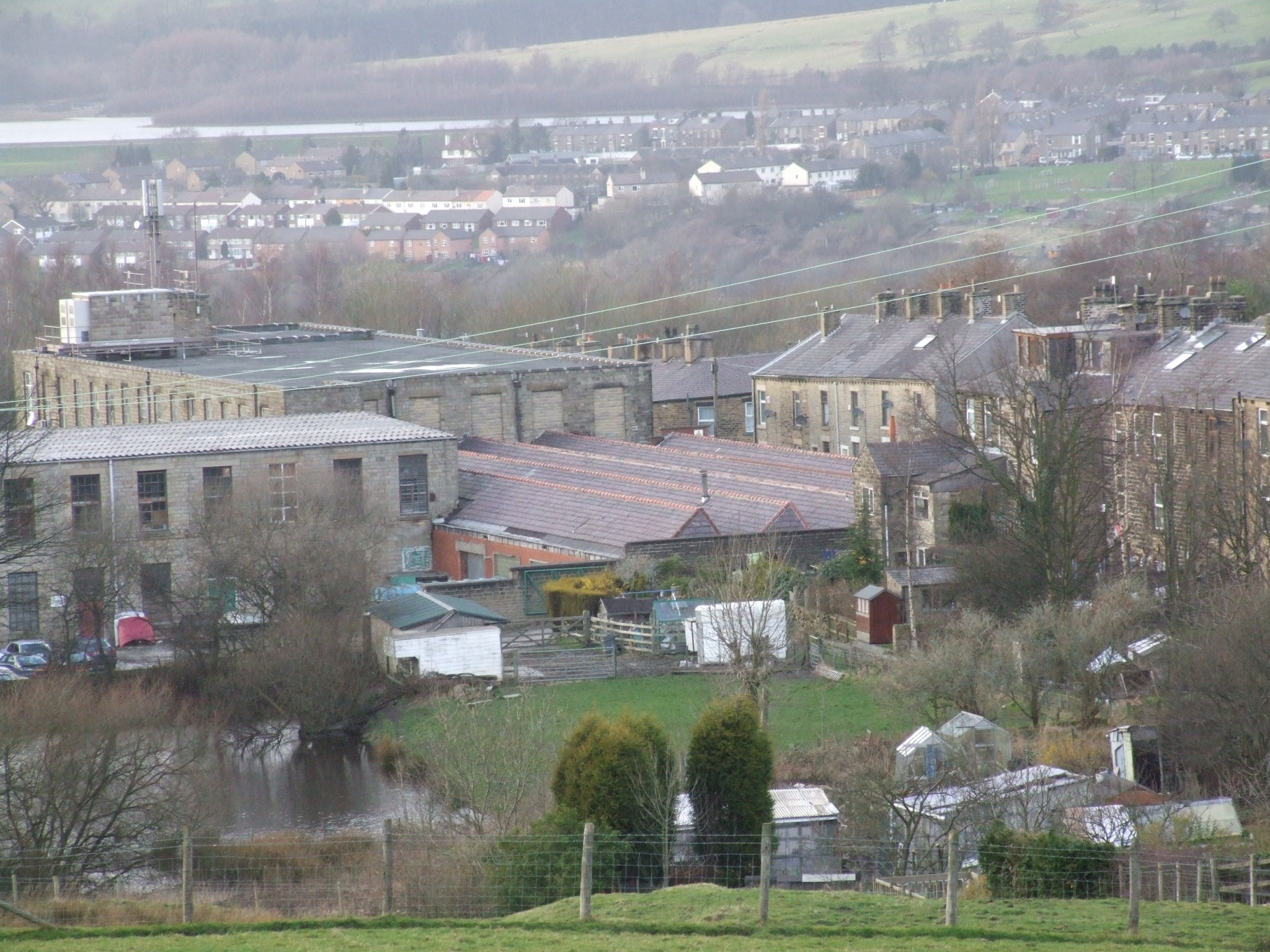
Hadfield Mills, Padfield

Hadfield Mills, on Platt Street, is a former cotton mill; the weaving sheds and other buildings are now used by a variety of small and medium enterprises.

== Notable locals ==
- Happy Mondays frontman Shaun Ryder and Bez both lived in Padfield at one time.

== See also ==
- Listed buildings in Padfield
