= Woodhead =

Woodhead may refer to:

== Places ==
- Burley Woodhead, hamlet in Bradford, England
- Woodhead, Aberdeenshire, settlement in Scotland
- Woodhead Dam, South Africa
- Woodhead, Derbyshire, settlement in England, near to:
  - Woodhead Reservoir, artificial lake
- Woodhead, Hamilton, Scotland, neighbourhood in South Lanarkshire
- Woodhead Line, railway line in the north of England, featuring:
  - Woodhead railway station
  - Woodhead Tunnel

== Other uses ==
- Woodhead (surname)
- Woodhead Commission, a 1938 commission on the future of Palestine
- Woodhead Publishing, an international publishing company
- A628 road, part of which is the Woodhead Pass over the Pennines
