= Crowden railway station =

Former railway station in Derbyshire, England

Crowden
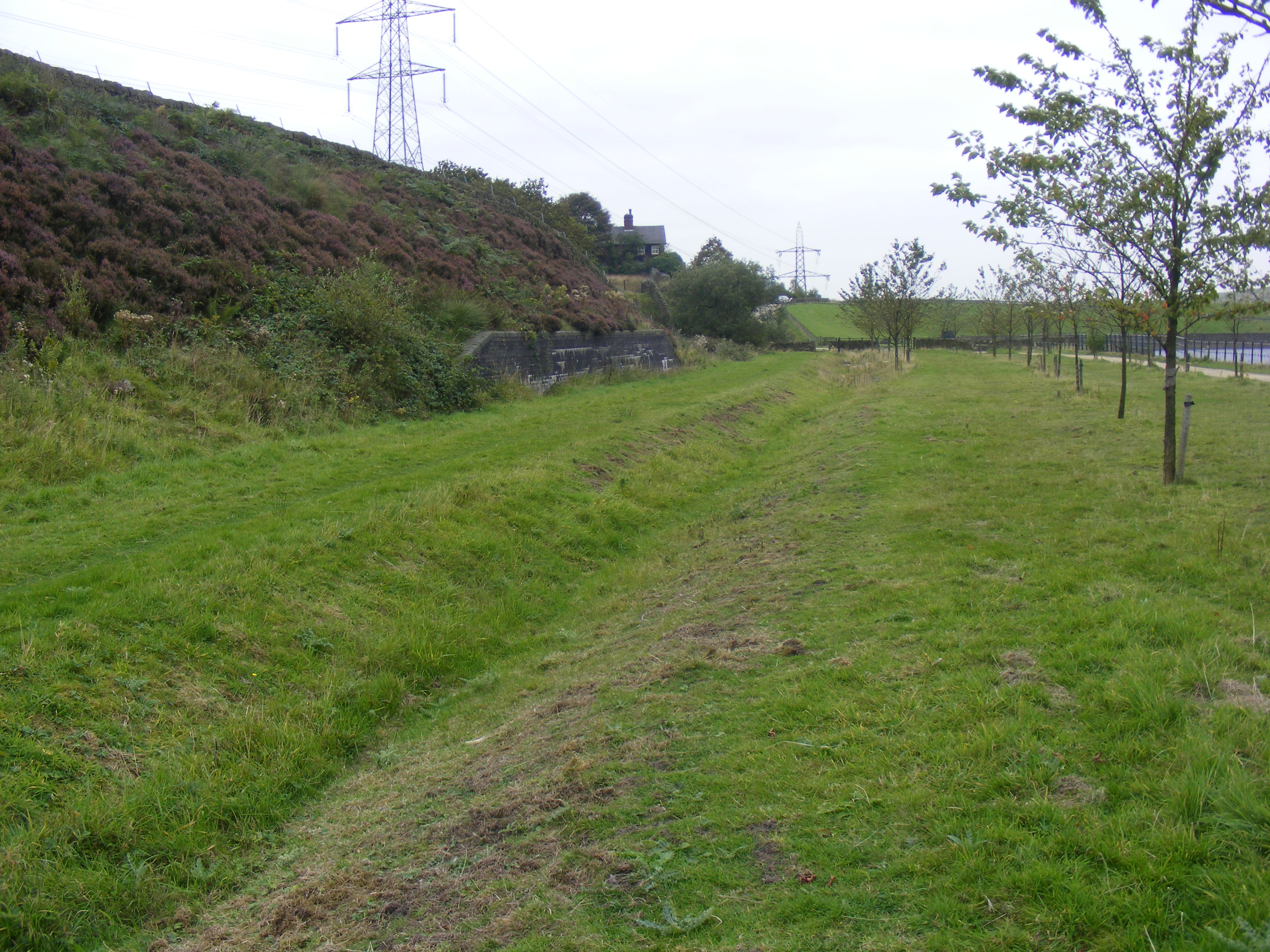
- Looking west in September 2009

General information
- Location: Crowden, High Peak, England
- Coordinates: 53.4914°N 1.8740°W
- Grid reference: SK083994

Other information
- Status: Disused

History
- Original company: Manchester, Sheffield and Lincolnshire Railway
- Pre-grouping: Great Central Railway
- Post-grouping: London and North Eastern Railway

Key dates
- 1 July 1861: Station opened
- 4 February 1957: Station closed
Location

Crowden railway station served the hamlet of Crowden, in Derbyshire, England, between 1861 and 1957. It was a stop on the Woodhead Line between Manchester London Road and Sheffield Victoria.

== History ==
The section of the Sheffield, Ashton-under-Lyne and Manchester Railway (SA&MR) between Dinting (then known as Glossop) and Woodhead was opened to public traffic on 8 August 1844, but there was no station between Hadfield and Woodhead initially. At the start of 1847, the SA&MR amalgamated with other companies to form the Manchester, Sheffield and Lincolnshire Railway (MS&LR). On 1 August 1897, the MS&LR was renamed the Great Central Railway and this was merged with other railways to form the London and North Eastern Railway on 1 January 1923.

== Operation ==
A local millowner, Brown & Co., donated £50 towards the cost of providing a station at Crowden. Plans were drawn up in April 1857, but the MS&LR decided that the sum of £400 was too much and dropped the idea; however, they did not return the donation. When Brown & Co. complained in May 1860 about their loss, the plan was revived and the station was built, with the MS&LR meeting the balance of the £450 total cost. George Benton of Glossop was contracted for the building work, but the necessary road improvements were provided by Manchester Corporation; the station was adjacent to the dam at the lower end of the Woodhead Reservoir, which belonged to Manchester Corporation. The station was opened on 1 July 1861.

Preceding station	Disused railways	Following station
Hadfield	Manchester, Sheffield and Lincolnshire Railway; Woodhead Line	Woodhead

== Closure ==
The station was closed on 4 February 1957, but passenger trains continued to pass through until January 1970. It continued to see freight trains travel through until July 1981, when the line between Hadfield and Penistone was closed completely.

== The site today ==
Only the station master's house remains, but the former trackbed is now part of the Longdendale Trail, a shared-use path between Hadfield and Woodhead.
