= Woodhead, Derbyshire =

Coordinates: 53.497°N 1.846°W

Woodhead
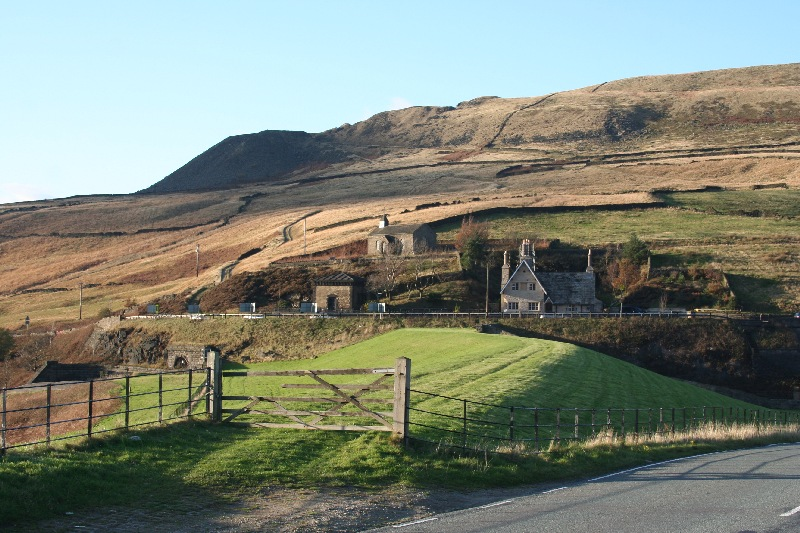
- St James Church and Bleak House, Woodhead

- Location within Derbyshire
- OS grid reference: SE103000
- District: High Peak
- Shire county: Derbyshire
- Region: East Midlands
- Country: England
- Sovereign state: United Kingdom
- Post town: GLOSSOP
- Postcode district: SK13
- Police: Derbyshire
- Fire: Derbyshire
- Ambulance: North West
- UK Parliament: High Peak

Woodhead is a small and scattered settlement at the head of the Longdendale valley in Derbyshire, England. It lies on the trans-Pennine A628 road connecting Greater Manchester and South Yorkshire, 6 miles (10 km) north of Glossop, 19 miles (31 km) east of Manchester and 18 miles (29 km) west of Barnsley. It is close to the River Etherow and the Trans Pennine Trail. Although part of Derbyshire since 1974, like nearby Tintwistle and Crowden the hamlet was in the historic county of Cheshire.

Woodhead is the location of the western portals of the Woodhead Tunnels, three former railway tunnels on the electrified Woodhead Line between Manchester and Sheffield. There was formerly a railway station and signal box at Woodhead. The Woodhead railway line closed in 1981; the trackbed between Woodhead and Hadfield now forms the Longdendale Trail. The platforms are still intact, although the track has been removed.

Among the remains in the graveyard of St James Church, a small 18th-century chapel, are the unmarked graves of navvies who died during the construction of the tunnels. Adjoining the church is Bleak House, a Grade-II-listed 19th-century dwelling. Two miles to the east, the Lady Cross marks the highest point of the former packhorse road from Longdendale to Rotherham. Only its base and the bottom of the shaft survive.

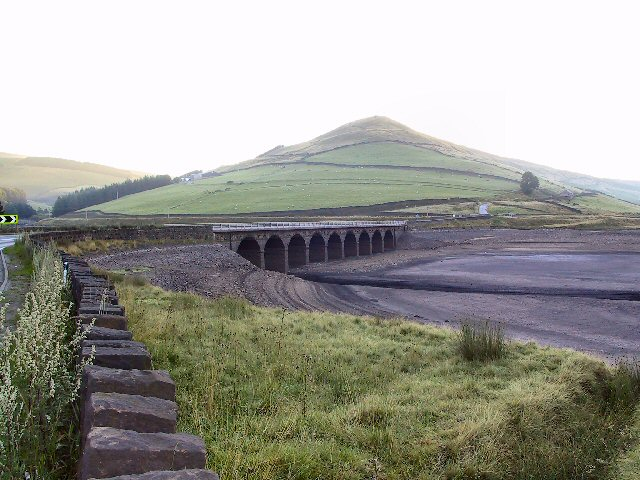
Woodhead Bridge

The hamlet gives its name to Woodhead Reservoir, the highest in the Longdendale Chain of reservoirs.

On 6 July 2014, Stage 2 of the 2014 Tour de France, from York to Sheffield, passed through the hamlet.
