= Woodhead railway station =

Disused railway station in Derbyshire, England

Woodhead
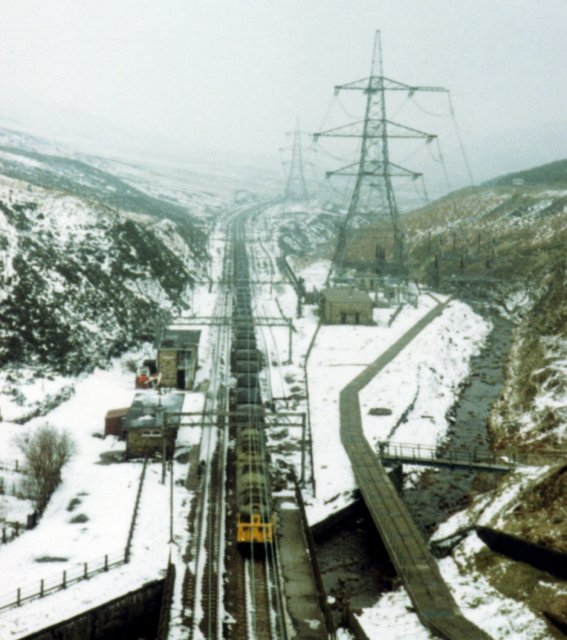
- Second Woodhead station seen from above tunnel in 1979

General information
- Location: Woodhead, High Peak; England
- Coordinates: 53.4954°N 1.8314°W
- Platforms: 2

Other information
- Status: Disused

History
- Original company: Sheffield, Ashton-under-Lyne and Manchester Railway
- Pre-grouping: Great Central Railway
- Post-grouping: London and North Eastern Railway

Key dates
- 8 April 1844: Opened
- 1953: Moved to new alignment
- 27 July 1964: Closed
Location

Woodhead railway station served the hamlet of Woodhead, in Derbyshire, England; it was a stop on the now-disused Woodhead Line between Manchester and Sheffield.

== History ==
The station was opened on 8 April 1844 by the Sheffield, Ashton-under-Lyne and Manchester Railway. It was served by stopping passenger trains operating on the route between Manchester London Road and Sheffield Victoria.

It was later operated by the Great Central Railway and the London and North Eastern Railway.

A new station was opened in 1953 by the Eastern Region of British Railways on a different site, in conjunction with the opening of the new Woodhead Tunnel and electrification of the line.

It was closed on 27 July 1964, but the line remained open for passengers trains until 1970 and to freight traffic until 1981.

Preceding station	Disused railways	Following station
Crowden	SAMR; Woodhead Line	Dunford Bridge

== The site today ==
Both platforms of the second station are extant; they are accessible on the Longdendale Trail shared-use path, which occupies the former trackbed between Hadfield and the west portal of the Woodhead Tunnel.

== Gallery ==
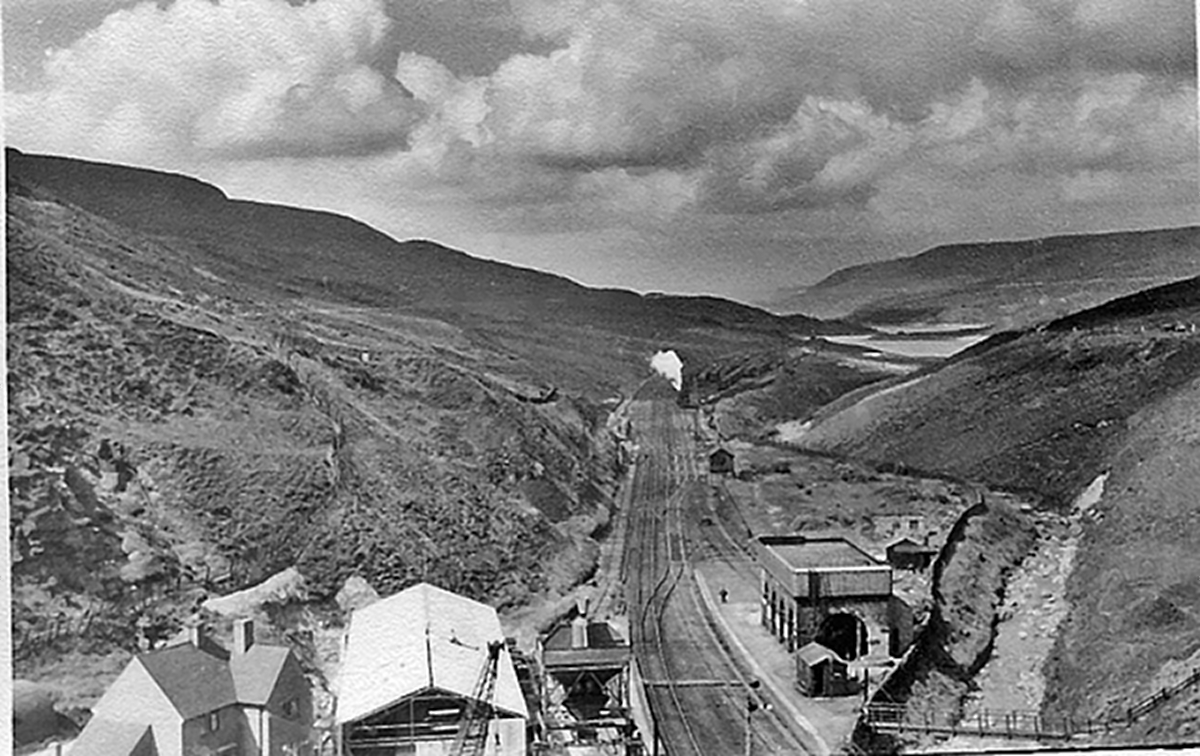
The original Woodhead station seen from above Woodhead tunnel in 1951

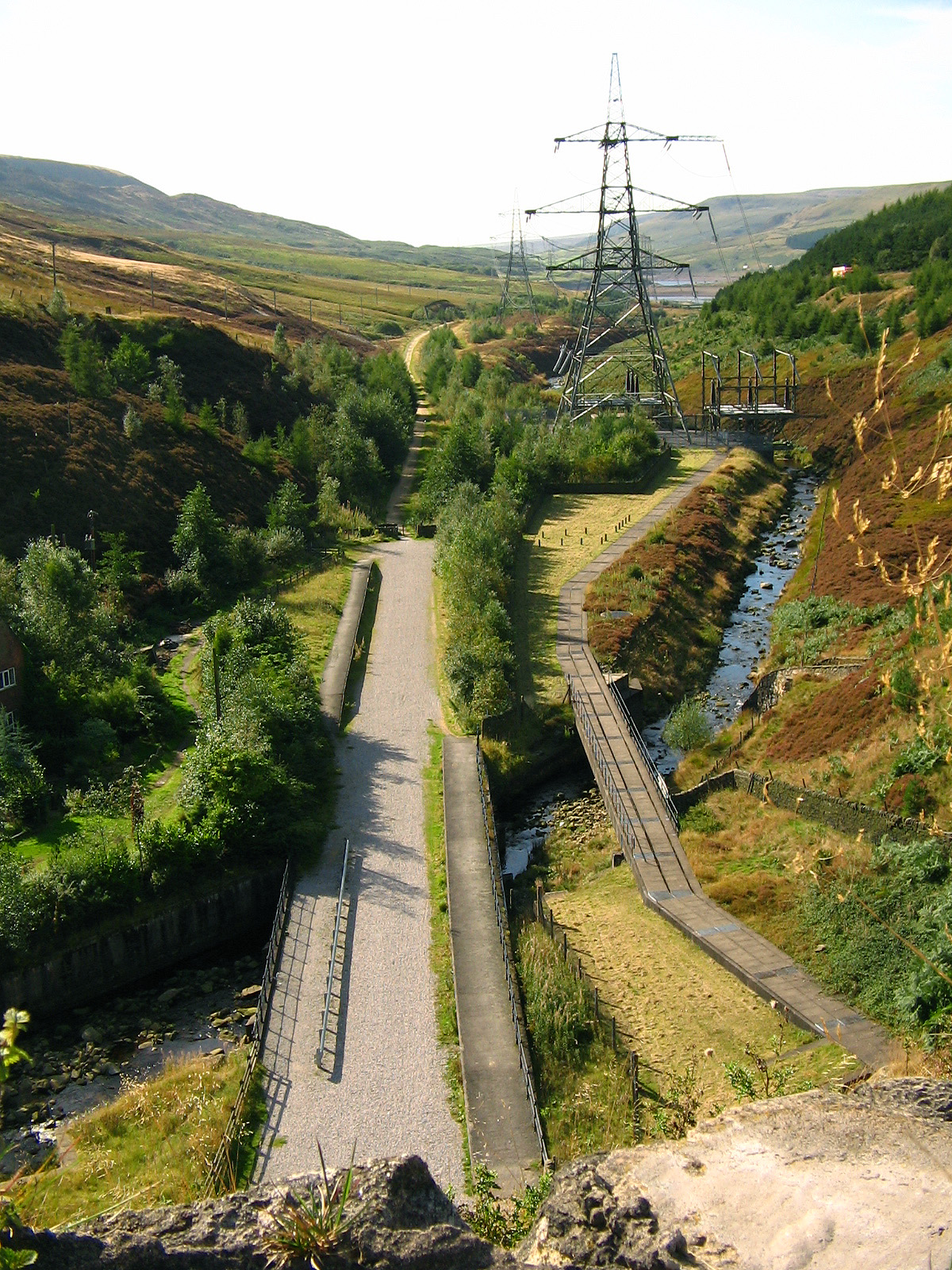
The remains of the station in 2005

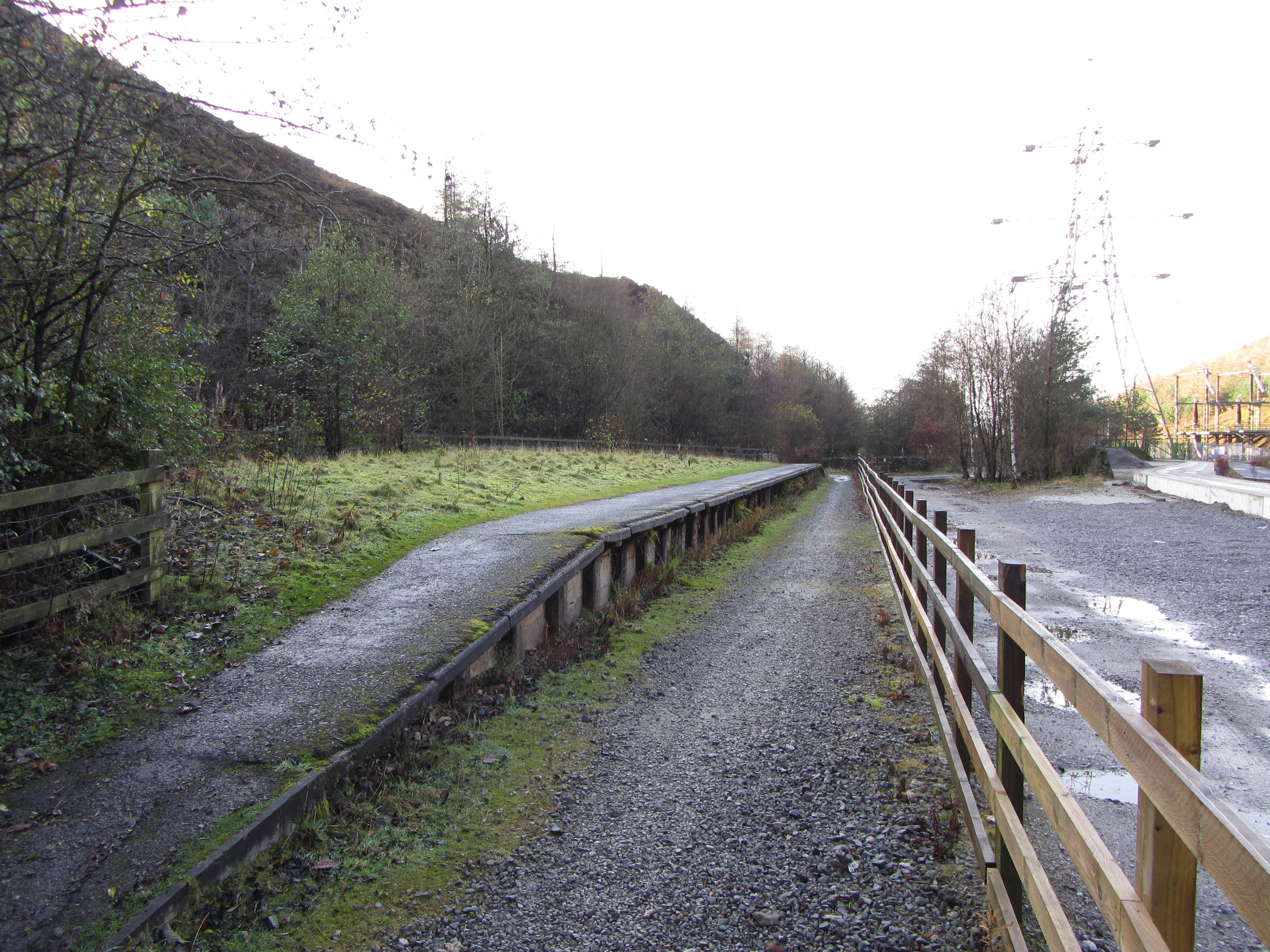
Disused platform in 2012
