= Longdendale Bypass =

Future road in England

Coordinates: 53°27′56″N 1°59′59″W

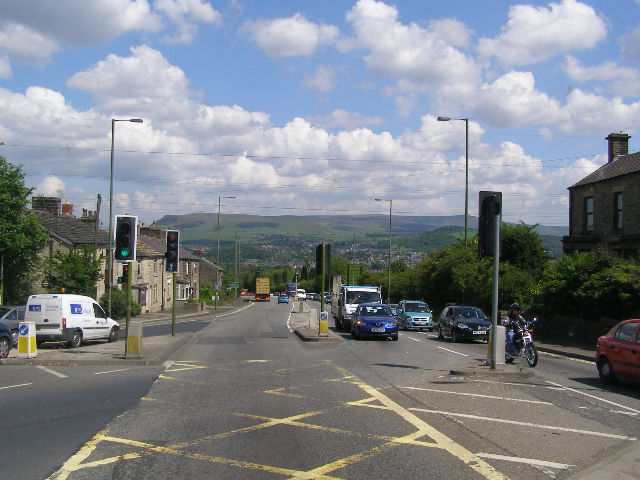
The A57 in Mottram would be bypassed

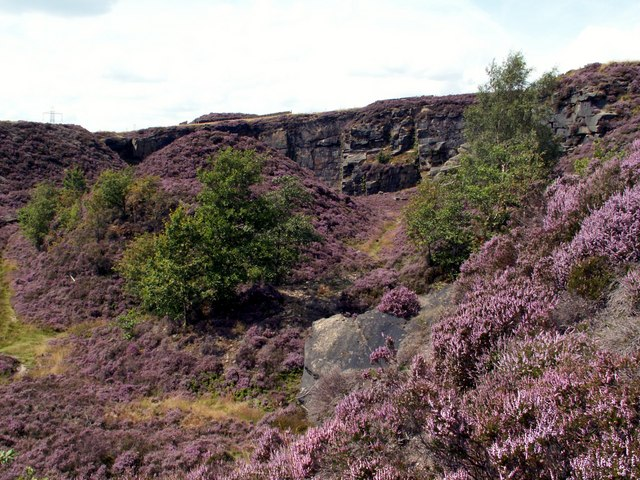
The road would have run through Holybank Quarry, Tintwistle

The Longdendale Bypass (also known as the A57/A628 Mottram-in-Longdendale, Hollingworth & Tintwistle Bypass) is a long-planned National Highways road scheme in the Tameside and High Peak districts in England, part of which is currently under construction. Its aim is to alleviate traffic congestion on the A57, A628, and A616 routes that presently pass through the villages. There is both support and opposition for this long-planned scheme, which will pass through the valley of Longdendale and part of the Peak District National Park.

After nearly fifty years, part of the road scheme – the Mottram Bypass and Glossop Spur – was approved by the Highways Agency on 2 December 2014; but almost a decade later, shovels were still to be seen on the ground. Construction was intended to start in Spring 2023, but appeals to the High Court meant construction did not start. The High Court dismissed the appeals against the bypass in November 2023. A final legal challenge to the bypass failed in April 2024, leaving National Highways free to begin constructing the road. Construction began in 2025.

== Background ==
The existing A628 trunk road connects the M67 from Manchester to the M1 in South Yorkshire. A single-carriageway road through the villages of Mottram in Longdendale, Hollingworth and Tintwistle and through the Peak District National Park, it is used by a relatively large number of heavy goods vehicles. Supporters of the scheme say that the A628 is one of the most congested A-road routes in the country, with high volumes of traffic (including HGVs) using a road which is totally unsuitable for the volume and nature of traffic it carries and that there is no viable alternative to a bypass. A survey in 2010 found that the junction of the A57 and M67 was the most congested in Manchester.

Concern has been raised that the scheme would not have improved safety on the Woodhead Pass, where the majority of serious accidents occur.

== Route ==
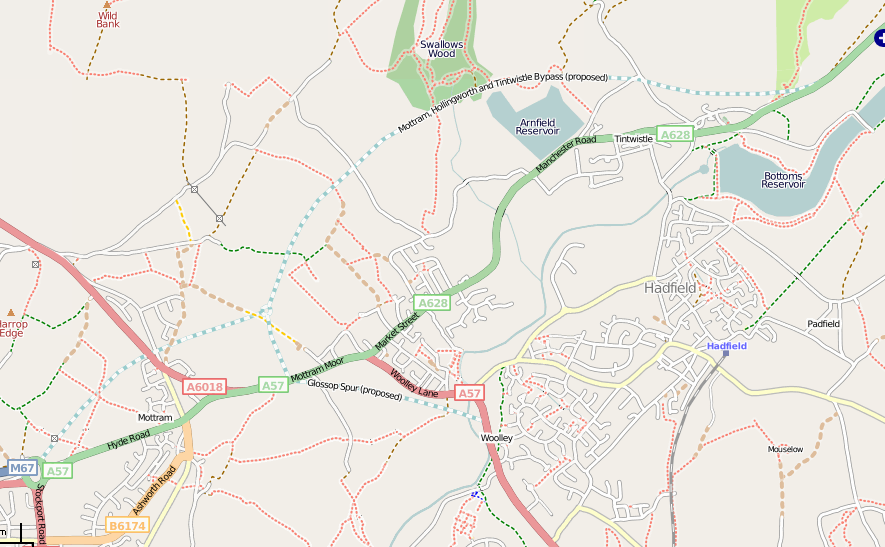
Map showing the proposed route in a broken teal line

The scheme envisaged a new dual carriageway that would have headed north-east from the eastern end of the M67, passed under the A6018 Roe Cross Road, Old Road and Old Hall Lane in a 170-metre (558 ft) tunnel approximately 120 metres (394 ft) north of the point where those roads converge. To the east of this area the route would have continued onto a roundabout which provides for a link road down to the A57 at Mottram Moor. To the east of the roundabout, the preferred route would have proceeded north-east through the Swallows Wood nature reserve, then curved south-east to join the existing A628 east of Tintwistle near Townhead Farm. Another proposed local authority road, the 'Glossop Spur', would have linked to the A57 at Woolley Bridge.

The Department for Transport published both a map of the immediate area and another showing routes across the Peak District and the location of Flouch, which were scheduled to have associated traffic works.

== History ==
Since 1971 residents of Tameside have been working and lobbying, with local politicians, for a better solution for the A57/A628 connection of Manchester and Sheffield to the M67 – passing through villages of Mottram and Hollingworth, as well as affecting those around it. The plans were restored in the Conservative government's Roads for Prosperity white paper in 1989 following a public consultation process. A preferred route was selected in October 1993 but work was suspended in 1996 following further government reviews of the national road-building programme work. In December 2014 the scheme was approved.

In July 1998 the incumbent Labour government published the results of its own review in the document A New Deal for Trunk Roads in England and included the bypass as a scheme to be progressed through the preparatory stages. In November 2002, the Highways Agency submitted a report to the regional planning bodies (North West, East Midlands, Yorkshire and the Humber). The scheme received support from the communities affected by the bypass in the form of a petition with 9,000 signatures that was delivered to Downing Street in February 2003. In this submission, they formed the conclusion that there were no realistic alternatives to a bypass of the villages to solve the problems that existed. In April 2003 the bypass entered the Targeted Programme of Improvements, recognising the likelihood of increased traffic along the route and including proposals to discourage road users from switching from other cross-Pennine routes.

Under the Early Contractor Involvement (ECI) initiative the Highways Agency appointed Mowlem to take the scheme forward. The ECI allows for detailed planning work to be carried out while the scheme moves through statutory procedures. On 31 January 2006 the Secretary of State for Transport published formal proposals in the form of Draft Orders to construct the bypass, make good the older roads, and introduce 'route restraint measures'. The public and other interested organisations were allowed a period of 13 weeks until 5 May 2006 to express their opinions on the proposals. In May 2006 the Highways Agency released information under the Freedom of Information Act of all properties they had purchased in connection with the scheme during the previous 30 years, and an updated copy was also released in August 2008.

By the end of the consultation period 1,400 people had written letters expressing their objection to the scheme, with a further 1,000 in favour. Stephen Ladyman, then Minister of State for Transport, stated that "life for people in Mottram, Tintwistle and Hollingworth should be greatly improved by this bypass. Getting traffic out of the villages will make them a safer and healthier place to live". Objections were also received from the Countryside Agency, English Nature, the Peak District National Park Authority and the National Trust. The North West Regional Assembly had presented advice to ministers in January 2006 and then in June 2006 provided a revised sequencing of priority schemes.

On 6 July 2006 the Secretary of State for Transport responded to these revised sequences and confirmed that funding provision could be made for the Longdendale bypass beyond 2010/11. In December 2006 Rebecca Lush, a long-standing road protester and founder of Road Block, claimed the scheme was "particularly inappropriate and damaging". In January 2007 Stephen Ladyman stated that construction work was expected to start in spring 2013.

The change to the proposed timing and costs required a review of the environmental statement, which was duly republished with associated draft orders on 8 February 2007. There followed a six-week consultation period during which the Peak District authority responded. Having been estimated at £90 million in 2003, the cost of the proposal was estimated to have risen to £240m–£315m in 2008.

On 2 December 2014, the government announced that it would invest £170 m on the A57, A628 and A628 trans-Pennine route, including a bypass for the village of Mottram. The Chancellor of the Exchequer at the time, George Osborne, gave the go-ahead for an initial scheme of at least £170 million to resolve the traffic issue through Mottram and to build a link road to Glossop. The government would also consult on whether to extend the proposed scheme to relieve pressure on Tintwistle as well. In addition to the works announced, there are also studies and proposals into the possibility of a tunnel under the Peak District to link Manchester with Sheffield, with some of the proposed tunnel routes using the existing M67 route to link the M60 and M1 motorways.

Plans for a dual-carriageway bypass taking a different route were displayed in 2020. At that time, it was stated that work would begin in 2023. The plans were priced at £228 million.

== Public inquiry ==
Details of the public inquiry were announced in April 2007. It was to be run by Persona Associates with John Watson as Inspector. An official public inquiry website was launched offering news, transcripts and documentation for download.

The inquiry opened on 26 June 2007. On 16 July 2007 the inquiry was adjourned until 4 September with a final deadline for the submission of evidence of 14 August 2007. On 11 September 2007 the inquiry was again adjourned until 19 September to allow the Highways Agency to review traffic evidence, with further adjournments until 18 December.

On 4 December 2007 the Highways Agency published Route Restraint Measures – Explanation of the Further Change in the Traffic Forecasts and suggested that this data would not be available until Easter 2008. The inquiry reviewed this new information on 18 December 2007 at which time it was adjourned to allow the Highways Agency to correct their traffic modelling. The inspector commented that "it was the fifth iteration of the traffic model since the original announcement in February 2006". The inquiry was then "Adjourned Indefinitely Pending the Publication of Revised Evidence by The Highways Agency and Tameside MBC".

On 3 March 2008 the Highways Agency responded to queries from the inspector indicating that it expected to have revised evidence available by October 2008.

In September 2008 the Highways Agency indicated that the revised information would now be available for public consultation in May 2009 and that the public inquiry could start again in Autumn 2009.

In February 2009 the Campaign for Better Transport reported that funding for the road scheme would not be available before 2016.

In March 2009 the Highways Agency announced that it was pulling out of the public inquiry, citing the decision of the Regional Leaders' Forum, 4NW, to delay the start of the scheme by at least four years. The accompanying press release stated that "the extended period of time between the publication of the draft proposals for the scheme in 2007 and the earliest date at which the Inquiry might be reconvened" was a further factor in the decision to withdraw.

== Proponents and opponents ==
=== Proponents ===
- Agencies: UK Government, National Highways and Department for Transport, AGMA (the Association of Greater Manchester Authorities)
- Campaign group: Longdendale Siege Committee
- Individuals: Local MPs: Andrew Bingham and Robert Largan (High Peak, Conservative), and Jonathan Reynolds (Stalybridge and Hyde, Labour), Tom Levitt and James Purnell (former Labour MPs for the aforementioned constituencies), Roy Oldham (Executive Leader of Tameside), Labour-controlled local authority Tameside and Longdendale Councillors, Chris Webster (Old Glossop Ward Councillor)

=== Opponents ===
- Agencies: Campaign to Protect Rural England, Countryside Agency, English Nature, Environment Agency, National Trust, Peak District National Park Authority, Ramblers Association
- Campaign groups: Alternative Proposals for Transport, Save Swallows Wood and Woodhead Against Increased Traffic (WAIT)
- Individuals: Michael Clapham (former Labour MP for Barnsley West and Penistone), the Directors of the Public Health of Greater Manchester

== Alternative measures ==
Opponents of the scheme support the Way to Go initiative from Campaign to Protect Rural England (CPRE), which is calling upon councillors, MPs, and the Peak District National Park Authority to reject the bypass scheme. The campaign group support other measures that it considers would improve local transport without causing damage to the environment. This alternative approach calls for:

- Weight restrictions on the A57/628, forcing heavy goods traffic onto the existing M1/M62 motorway network and away from the Peak District National Park. (This has the drawback that the M1/M62 route through West Yorkshire is already one of the most congested pieces of motorway in Britain, in addition to the environmental consequences of almost doubling the distance of a typical Sheffield to Manchester journey.)
- Weight restrictions on the A57/628 but only during rush-hour periods. (Subject to similar considerations as above.)
- Road tolls on the A57/628.
- Traffic calming in the villages on the A628 and A57 to prevent 'rat running'.
- A ‘Streets for People’ programme in all residential areas to encourage walking and cycling.
- Continental-style safe routes to school.
- Travel-to-work plans.
- Integrated bus and train services throughout the Peak District and improved facilities for pedestrians and cyclists.
- Discount travel by public transport.
- Improved public transport links and safe cycle routes to local railway stations.
- A new railway station at Gamesley and improved services at existing stations.

Some opponents of the scheme also advocate 'Translink' as an alternative proposal, which envisages enabling (through the reopening of the Woodhead Tunnel) direct rail links between Glossop and Sheffield and beyond. Translink claims the "rolling highway" would be a quick, safe and cost-effective means of carrying freight across the Pennines, a credible alternative to using the A616/A628 road. HGV vehicles would roll-on and roll-off the low-floor wagons.

== Traffic figures ==
Whilst supporters of the scheme argue for the bypass on the basis that it will relieve the three villages of traffic congestion, the Highways Agency's own figures do not fully support this contention. In the environmental statement produced by the Highways Agency, the predicted traffic figures support the following largely temporary reductions in traffic by 2010:

- a 100% permanent reduction along the westbound section of the A57 after the junction with the A6018—this is because this section of road will be blocked and made into a one-way street, making it impossible to access the A628.
- a 13% reduction in traffic along Market Street (A628), Hollingworth (decreasing to 5% by 2025).
- an 8% reduction in traffic along Mottram Moor (A57) (decreasing to 4% by 2025).

All other routes show a marked increase in traffic, both immediately and over time:

- Brookfield (A57)—an 18% increase by 2010 (rising to 21% by 2025).
- M67—a 17% increase by 2010 (rising to 24% by 2025).
- Back Moor (A6018)—a 9% increase by 2010 (rising to 23% by 2025).
- Ashworth Lane (B6174)—a 6% increase by 2010 (rising to 36% by 2025).
- Roe Cross Road (A6018)—a 6% increase by 2010 (rising to 36% by 2025).

The aim of the bypass is to reduce traffic flow along (at least) the A57 and the reviewed environmental statement of February 2007 provided radically different traffic forecasts to the originals summarised above. In particular, the new forecast indicated that there would be over 26,000 vehicles per day travelling along Back Moor. According to the data presented by the Highways Agency, this amount of traffic is greater than that presently using the main A57 Hyde Road through Mottram.

== Climate change impacts ==
Government-funded research carried out by English Nature found that the proposed scheme would increase greenhouse gas CO_{2} pollution in the area by 15,840 tonnes per annum. Furthermore, the costs of the CO_{2} pollution were not included in the Highways Agency cost–benefit analysis. In the republished Environmental Statement summary, the Highways Agency admit that the scheme will entail "an estimated increase of 9% in emissions of the greenhouse gas carbon dioxide". However, in a Statement of the Area address on 21 November 2006, the Leader of Tameside Council announced that 4,500 trees had already been planted, increasing to 10,000 to compensate for the loss of trees when the bypass is built and to help mitigate the increases in CO_{2} emissions. The council leader also claimed that each tree planted would offset 75 kg of CO_{2} per annum. This figure—for trees to be planted in northern England—is 3.5 times greater than that for trees planted in tropical rainforests.

In an alternative proposal to the bypass, Translink claims that the removal of HGVs from the A628 onto a cross-Peak train line would save approximately 100,000 tons of CO_{2} per year.

== See also ==
- Woodhead Line
- Campaign for Better Transport
