= Trans-Pennine road tunnel =

Proposal to improve travel between Manchester and Sheffield, England

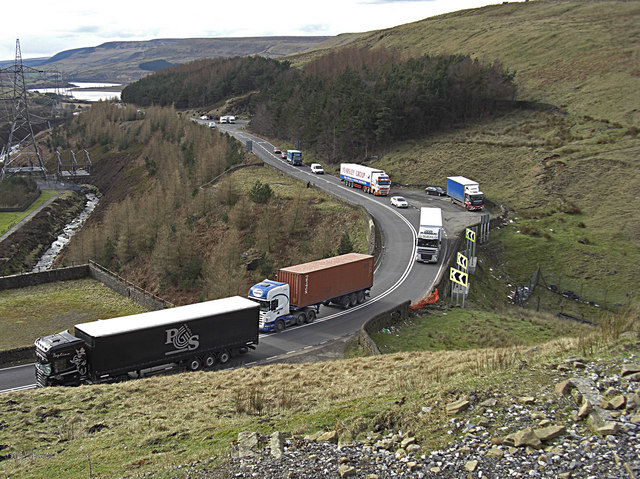
The Trans-Pennine road tunnel would relieve congestion on the A628 Woodhead Pass

The Trans-Pennine road tunnel is a proposal to construct a tunnel under the Peak District to improve road connections between Manchester and Sheffield, without significant detriment to the ecology of the Peak District National Park. Travel between the two cities is difficult, as the only direct roads are the A628, which is narrow and winding, and the A57 which is narrower still, and is threatened with closure due to the cost of dealing with landslips along the Snake Pass section of the road. Both are subject to closure during the winter months due to adverse weather conditions, when the alternative is to use the M62 motorway, adding over 50 miles (80 km) to the journey.

== History ==
To the east of Manchester is the 5-mile (8 km) long M67 motorway. It was built in the mid-1970s as two separate projects, the Denton relief road and the Hyde bypass. It cost around £30 million and was described by Simon Bain, a local journalist, as "the whitest of all elephants". However, it was not primarily a bypass around two small towns in Greater Manchester, but was part of a larger scheme to create a motorway link between Manchester and Sheffield, starting at the Mancunian Way in central Manchester and ending at the M1 motorway to the north of Sheffield.

Further progress was hampered by a wave of protests in the 1970s against building roads, particularly in environmentally sensitive areas. The route from Manchester to Sheffield needed to cross the Pennines, passing through the Peak District National Park. The Woodhead line had been opened in 1954 to provide an electrified rail link between the two cities. The government in the late 1960s decided that the route could be used for the motorway, and there were suspicions that the line was run down in order to facilitate this. The Woodhead Tunnel would have provided a route beneath the central section of the Peak District, but after the railway closed in 1981, planners decided that it was much too small for a dual carriageway, and the wrong shape to allow lorries to use it even if it became a one-way road tunnel. By the mid-1980s, the idea for a Manchester to Sheffield motorway had been abandoned.

This meant that traffic had to continue using the existing roads between the cities, which consist of the A628 Woodhead Pass and the A57 Snake Pass. Both are winding and narrow in places, and are often subject to delays. Road closures occur every 11 days on average, with most of them lasting for more than two hours. Over three quarters of the closures are caused by road traffic accidents or poor weather conditions. Additionally, Snake Pass suffers from landslides at four locations along its route, and in 2026, Derbyshire County Council estimated that repairs could cost around £100 million, which was far in excess of the budget that they had for such work.

Other ideas for crossing the national park without damaging its ecology were gradually formed. In 2012 a businessman called Tony Hickton from Barnsley, who ran a construction inspection business, suggested that a new road from near junction 36 on the M1 motorway to the M67 motorway, including a tunnel through the national park, would provide a significant boost to the economy. The South Yorkshire politician Angela Smith said at the time that the idea should be considered.

=== Developments from 2014 ===
As part of the government's road investment strategy, first published in 2014, they proposed a study to look at the potential for a road tunnel beneath the Peak District, to fill a gap in the strategic road network which made travel between Manchester and Sheffield difficult. They expected that this would bring large benefits to the regional economy and would enhance the national park by removing traffic from it. A surface route across the national park was ruled out because of its effects on the landscape and ecologically sensitive areas. Highways England (now called National Highways) was commissioned by the Department for Transport and Transport for the North to carry out the Trans-Pennine Tunnel study in July 2015.

Map showing possible route corridors for a Trans-Pennine road tunnel

When the study was completed, it suggested a two lane dual carriageway designed to motorway standards. The link would be between 24 and 26 miles (39 and 42 km) in length, with the tunnelled section between 12 and 20 miles (19 and 32 km) long, depending on the route selected. Each carriageway would be in a separate bore, with a service tunnel below the road surface. It was estimated that some 35,000 vehicles per day would use the new link on weekdays. The tunnels would be constructed using tunnel boring machines, and some 10 to 15 million cubic metres of rock would be removed. Tunnelling would be relatively straightforward, as most of it would be cut through millstone grit.

Based on the potential benefits of the new route, and the fact that it was technically viable to build it, several routes were considered, but were narrowed down to three main corridors. Corridor B broadly ran beneath the surface route of the A616 and the A628 Woodhead Pass. Corridor A ran a little further to the north, while corridor C ran further to the south. Estimated costs varied between £6.5 and £10.1 billion, depending on which route was selected.

Ultimately, the project proved to be too expensive. By late 2017, the length of tunnel had been shortened, moving the portals within the national park, and the project would include upgrading sections of the A628. Transport for the North said this would reduce the cost, and the revised scheme would be presented to the government in late 2018. The new plan would involve tunnelling through ground that was higher and more challenging, and would provide better access to the Peak District. Highways England stated that the cost would be less, but were still quoting £8 to £12 billion in 2020. By early 2021, Transport for the North was calling for the plan to be dropped, although they noted that the existing routes were closed for an average of 70 days per year due to poor weather conditions, and that something needed to be done to improve the situation. By the time the government's second road investment strategy document was published, covering the period 2020 to 2025, all mention of the tunnel had been dropped, and the only mention of the Manchester to Sheffield route was the short Mottram Bypass at the end of the M67.

== A new approach ==
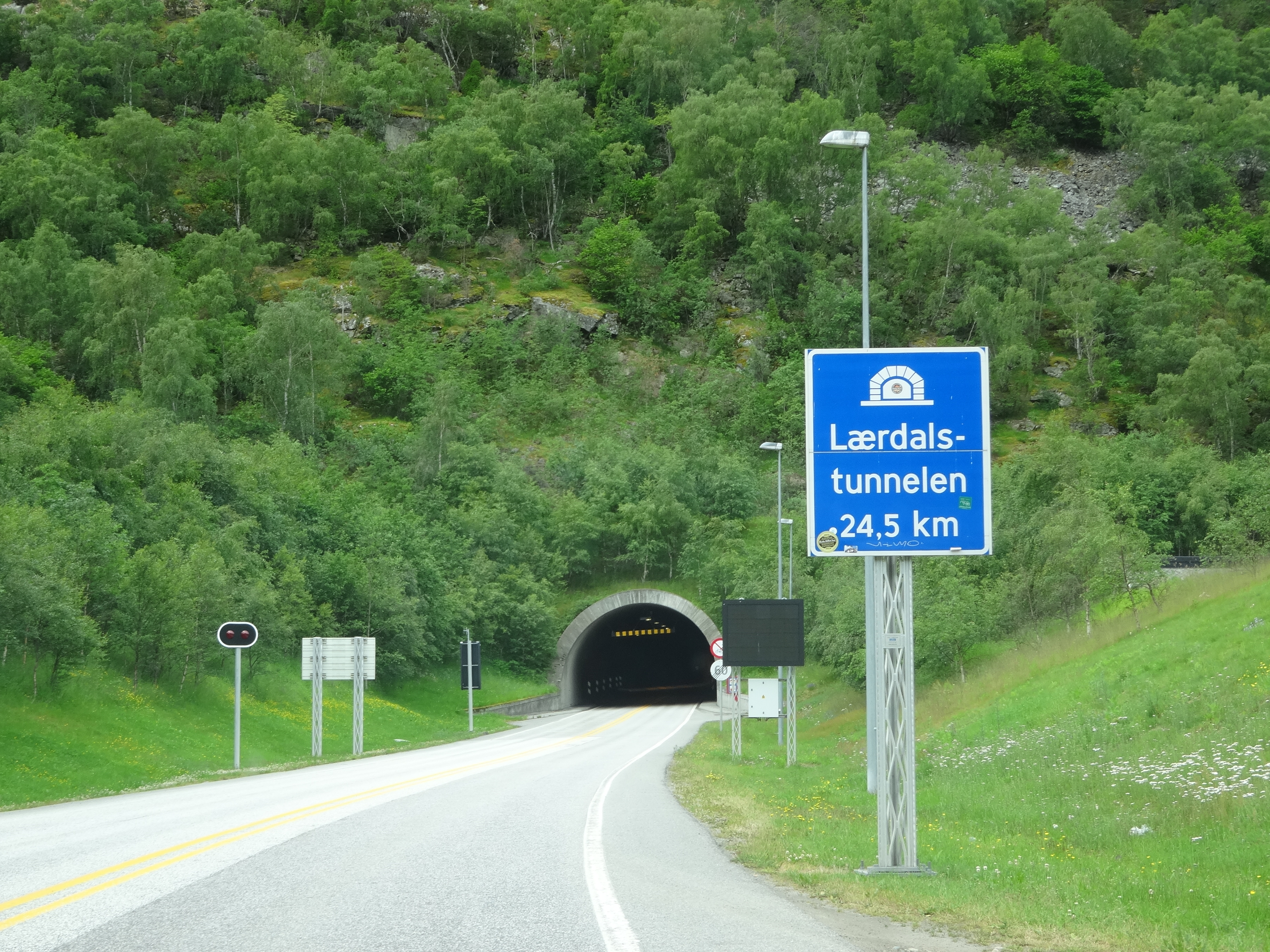
The Lærdal Tunnel in Norway cost much less than National Highways costings for a Trans-Pennine tunnel

In 2026, Future Works, a private sector group of infrastructure advisers proposed a scheme called Trans‑Pennine Connect for a 14-mile (23 km) dual carriageway road tunnel under the Pennines to improve journey times between Manchester and Sheffield. Most of the arguments for it were similar to those for the original National Highways scheme, but they acknowledged that the cost of using tunnel boring machines to create such a tunnel had been the main reason that the project had been abandoned. They proposed that their scheme could be built for around one-fifth of the previously quoted price, by using drill and blast techniques rather than boring machines. This technique is used extensively in Norway and other Scandinavian countries for constructing long road tunnels, and based on a comparison with the slightly longer Lærdal Tunnel in Norway, they believed that the Pennine tunnel could be built for less than £2 billion.

Future Works stated that the significantly lower cost of their construction could free up funds to finance the reopening of the Woodhead rail link. They also believed that the road tunnel could be built without funding from the government. The scheme was welcomed by the East Midlands Combined County Authority, but not by the Department for Transport, who said that the financial and environmental costs meant that they had no plans for a tunnel. The A628/A616 roads would benefit from measures to improve safety and resilience, which had been identified by National Highways. These were detailed in their third road investment strategy.

However, the third road investment strategy, covering 2026 to 2031, made no specific mention of either the A628 or the A616. It mentioned that the Trans-Pennine Tunnel study had finished in 2021, and had become part of the Trans Pennine Connectivity, Safety and Resilience Study, which would inform the ways money was spent during the third investment period. It also mentioned that the Mottram Bypass was a project that had begun in a previous investment period and was continuing during the current one.

The drill and blast method which Future Works are proposing to use is fairly standard practice within the mining industry. Holes are drilled into the rock face to allow explosives to be placed within them. Once detonated, the dust is cleared, broken rock is removed, and the exposed rock is supported, before the process is repeated. Progress is slower than using a boring machine, but it is also much cheaper, because it uses a much smaller team of specialist engineers than needed for tunnel boring projects, and relies on the natural strength of the surrounding rock. In addition, the amount of rock removed is some 40 per cent lower, since the finished bore is an inverted "U" shape, rather than a much larger circular shape. Construction costs for the Lærdal tunnel, which is longer than the proposed Pennine tunnel but only carries a single lane in each direction were only £130 million.

Future Works was founded by Michael Dnes, who until 2021 was a civil sevant working for the Department for Transport, where he worked on the road investment strategy and the government's plans for a similar tunnel. His co-founder was Alex Griffiths, who was head of project management for the expansion of Heathrow Airport. In November 2026 they were given a grant of £500,000 to develop the project from the UK Dynamism Fund. Andrew Bennett, who is the fund lead for the UK Dynamism Fund, said "It is one of the most ambitious schemes anywhere in the UK and it is very easy for us to support them." The grant will allow Future Works to turn the concept into a workable design. Dnes expressed amazement that drill and blast technology had not been used in the north since Victorian times. The announcement was welcomed by Oliver Coppard, the Mayor of South Yorkshire, who was keen to explore any credible solutions to the connectivity that South Yorkshire "needs and deserves".

Drill and blast has been used for tunnel constuction more recently the Dnes suggests. In the 1970s, three miners built the new Moelwyn Tunnel on the Ffestiniog Railway using the technique. One of the drivers was the quotations provided by professional engineering companies, with even the lowest far exceeding the railway's budget.

== Bibliography ==
- Charlesworth, George (1984). A history of British motorways. Thomas Telford. ISBN 978-0-7277-0159-6.
- DfT (December 2014). Road Investment Strategy: Overview (PDF). Department for Transport. ISBN 978-1-84864-148-8.
- DfT (March 2020). Road Investment Strategy 2: 2020-2025 (PDF). Department for Transport. ISBN 978-1-5286-1678-2.
- DfT (March 2026). Road Investment Strategy 3: 2026-2031 (PDF). Department for Transport. ISBN 978-1-5286-6242-0.
- Highways England (2016). "Trans-Pennine Tunnel Study Stage 3 Report" (PDF). Highways England and Dept of Transport. Archived (PDF) from the original on 10 November 2026.
- Johnson, Thomas (14 July 2026). "Peak District road tunnel could cost under £2bn using Norwegian tunnelling techniques". New Civil Engineer. Archived from the original on 16 October 2026.
- Loughran, Jack (2026). "£2bn blast-built tunnel could link Manchester and Sheffield through the Pennines". Institution of Engineering and Technology.
- Moran, Joe (2009). On Roads - a hidden history. Profile Books. ISBN 978-1-84668-052-6.
- Stokes, Spencer; Shaw, Grace (10 November 2026). "Feasibility funding for Pennine tunnel scheme". BBC News. Archived from the original on 10 November 2026.
