= 1981 in rail transport =

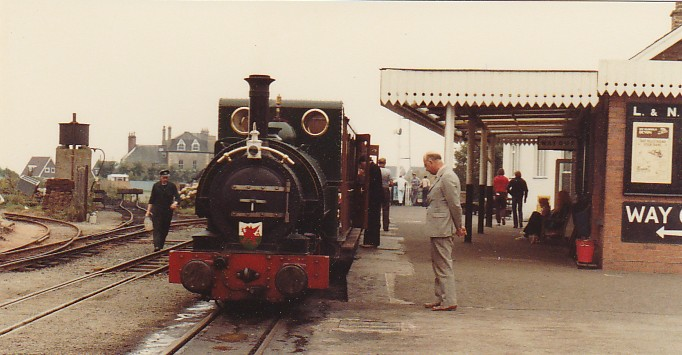
Talyllyn Railway, 1981

This article lists events related to rail transport that occurred in 1981.

== Events ==
=== February ===
- February 21 – MBTA discontinues passenger train service to Rhode Island.
- February 26 – A TGV Sud-Est (trainset no. 16) breaks the world record for rail speed at 380 km/h (236 mph) between Courcelles-Frémois (Côte-d'Or) and Dyé (Yonne), France.

=== April ===
- April 3 – The inaugural runs of the first 2600-series cars are made. The 2600-series (2601–3200), built by the Budd Company of Philadelphia, Pennsylvania for the Chicago ‘L’, had increased interior floor space and seats that fold up for wheelchairs. After completing the order, Budd (later Transit America) retired from railcar manufacturing.
- April 26 – Amtrak and Via Rail introduce the Maple Leaf passenger train between New York City and Toronto.

=== May ===
- May – General Motors Electro-Motive Division introduces the EMD SD50.
- May 29 – Karasuma Line open, for first time of Kyoto Municipal Subway, Kyoto, Japan.

=== June ===
- June 6 – In the Bihar train disaster, a passenger train carrying 800 or more passengers between Mansi and Saharsa, India, derailed and plunged into the Bagmati river while it was crossing a bridge. Estimates of the death toll range from 500 to 800.

=== July ===
- July 9 - A mudslide destroyed the Liziyida bridge near Ganluo County, Sichuan, China and moments later a train crashed into river, killing more than 200.
- July 17 – The Manchester–Sheffield–Wath Woodhead Line, carrying electric-hauled freight traffic through the Pennines in England, is closed and all British Rail Class 76 locomotives used on it are stored at Guide Bridge and Reddish before being scrapped.
- July 26
  - The San Diego Trolley starts operation. The starter line is the first entirely new light rail system in America and is credited with inspiring the choice of modes for later systems.
  - Fukuoka Airport Line (Airport Line) opens, the first section of Fukuoka City Subway, Kyushu, Japan.

=== September ===
- September 1
  - Illinois Terminal Railroad is purchased by Norfolk and Western Railroad.
  - The Seoul Metropolitan Subway is established as a corporation in Seoul, South Korea.
- September 15 – The John Bull becomes the oldest operable steam locomotive in the world when it is run under its own power by the Smithsonian Institution.
- September 27 – Passenger service begins on the very first TGV line, the LGV Sud-Est.

=== October ===
- October 25 – Amtrak introduces an unnamed overnight passenger train between Los Angeles and Sacramento, California. This train is named the Spirit of California in December.

=== November ===
- November 15 – Via Rail discontinues the Super Continental and Atlantic passenger trains.

=== December ===
- December 11 – The Seer Green rail crash occurred near Seer Green, Buckinghamshire, England, killing a driver and three passengers.

=== Unknown date ===
- Maine Central Railroad Company is purchased by Guilford Transportation Industries.
- Burlington Northern Railroad corporate headquarters are moved from St. Paul, Minnesota, to Seattle, Washington.
- Union Pacific 3985 is restored to operating condition, making it the largest operable steam locomotive in the world.
- William W. Stinson succeeds Fred Burbidge as president of Canadian Pacific Railway.
- The New York City Subway discontinues use of its R8A revenue car.
- The Northeast Rail Service Act of 1981 was signed into law.
- Conrail discontinues its electric operations.
- Yamanote Line introduces Automatic Train Control, city circle railway of Tokyo is now operated without lineside signals. Previously such system has been installed only at subways and high-speed lines.

== Deaths ==
=== May deaths ===
- May 11 - Rogers E. M. Whitaker ("E. M. Frimbo"), writer on rail travel (b. 1900).
