= Crowden, Derbyshire =

Hamlet in Derbyshire, England

Coordinates: 53.490°N 1.894°W

Crowden
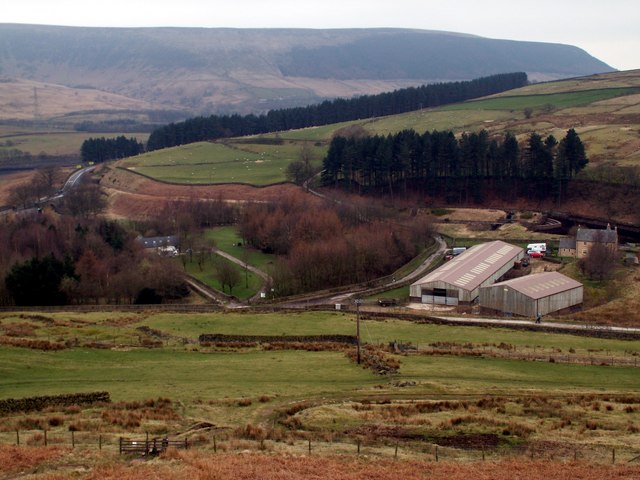
- Crowden from the northeast

- Location within Derbyshire
- OS grid reference: SK071992
- District: High Peak
- Shire county: Derbyshire
- Region: East Midlands
- Country: England
- Sovereign state: United Kingdom
- Post town: GLOSSOP
- Postcode district: SK13
- Dialling code: 01457
- Police: Derbyshire
- Fire: Derbyshire
- Ambulance: North West
- UK Parliament: High Peak

Crowden (also known as Crowden-in-Longdendale) is a hamlet in the High Peak borough of Derbyshire, England. Historically a part of Cheshire, Crowden was incorporated into Derbyshire for administrative and ceremonial purposes in 1974 and is now Derbyshire's most northerly settlement. It lies in the Longdendale valley, 5.8 miles (9.3 km) north-east of Glossop and 5.7 miles (9.2 km) south-west of Holme in West Yorkshire.

It lies on the trans-Pennine A628 road connecting Greater Manchester and South Yorkshire. It also lies very close to the Pennine Way long distance footpath, on which it is traditionally the first-night stop after Edale. A youth hostel, previously operated under a joint management agreement by the Youth Hostels Association (England & Wales) and Rotherham Metropolitan Borough Council, was transferred to the sole management of Rotherham Metropolitan Borough Council and closed (except for use by large groups) in 2014. The Torside Reservoir is to the south of Crowden. An army rifle range was situated at Crowden in the 1950s and 1960s.

The hamlet was previously served by Crowden railway station on the Woodhead Line between the cities of Manchester and Sheffield, but the station closed on 4 February 1957.
