= Longdendale Trail =

Long-distance rail trail in England

Coordinates: 53°28′45″N 1°54′53″W

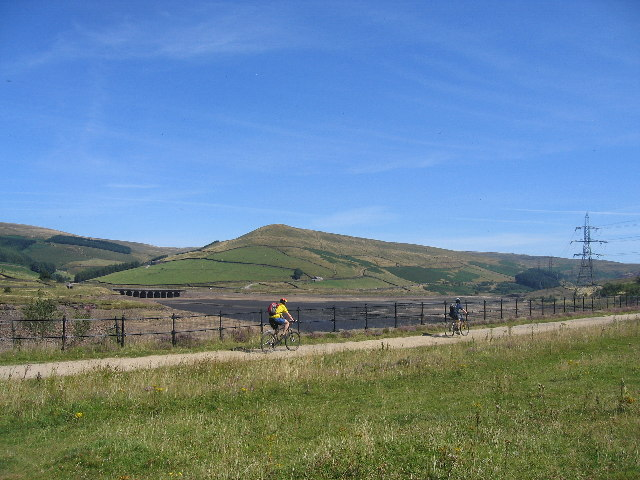
- The Longdendale Trail
- Length: 10.4 km (6.5 mi)
- Location: East Midlands, England
- Trailheads: Hadfield, Derbyshire; Woodhead Tunnel
- Use: Hiking, cycling, horse-riding
- Highest point: 286 m (938 ft)
- Season: All year

The Longdendale Trail is an English long-distance rail trail following the former Woodhead railway line, which ran between Manchester and Sheffield and closed east of Hadfield, Derbyshire in 1981. It has shallow gradients and a smooth surface that makes it popular with families and cyclists.

The trail, which opened in May 1992, forms part of the longer Trans Pennine Trail, NCR 62, that runs from coast to coast across the UK (Liverpool to Hull). This in turn is part of the E8 European long distance path, which runs for 4,700 kilometres (2,900 mi) from County Cork in Ireland to Istanbul in Turkey.

The Longdendale Trail follows the Longdendale Chain of reservoirs and is owned and managed by the water company United Utilities.

== See also ==
- Longdendale lights
- Rail trail
