= High Peak, Derbyshire =

Local government district in Derbyshire, England

Coordinates: 53.35°N 1.85°W

Borough of High Peak
- Non-metropolitan district; Borough
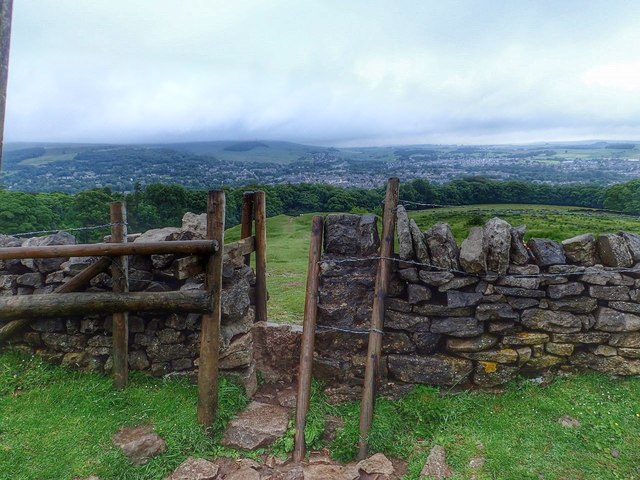
- A view of Buxton.

- Coat of Arms

- Shown within Derbyshire and England
- Sovereign state: United Kingdom
- Constituent country: England
- Region: East Midlands
- Ceremonial county: Derbyshire
- Admin. HQ: Buxton and Glossop

Government
  - Type: Non-metropolitan district; Borough
  - Body: High Peak Borough Council
  - Leadership: Cllr Anthony McKeown (L)
  - Executive: Labour
  - MPs: Jon Pearce (L)
  - Mayor: Cllr Dom Starkey (C)

Area
  - Total: 208 sq mi (539 km^{2})
  - Rank: 73rd

Population (2025)
  - Total: 91,676
  - Rank: Ranked 265th
  - Density: 441/sq mi (170/km^{2})

Ethnicity (2021)
  - Ethnic groups: List: 97.4% White; 1.3% Mixed; 0.8% Asian; 0.3% other; 0.2% Black

Religion (2021)
  - Religion: List: 51.5% Christianity; 47.1% no religion; 1.1% other; 0.3% Islam
- Time zone: UTC+0 (Greenwich Mean Time)
  - Summer (DST): UTC+1 (British Summer Time)
- Postcode: S, SK
- ONS code: 17UH
- GSS code: E07000037
- Website: highpeak.gov.uk

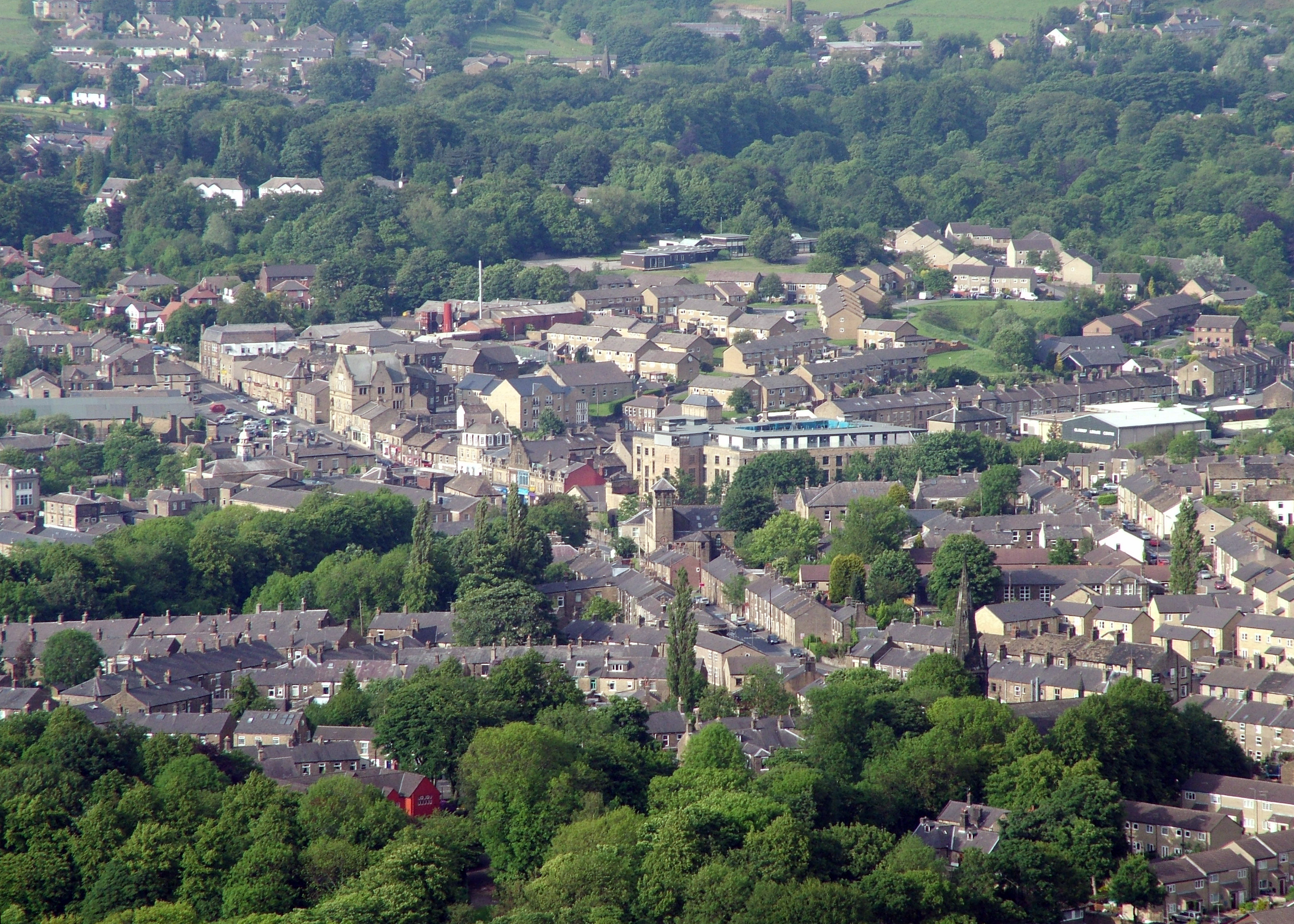
Glossop, the second administrative centre of High Peak and the largest settlement in the borough

High Peak is a local government district with borough status in Derbyshire, England, covering a high moorland plateau in the Dark Peak area of the Peak District National Park. The district stretches from Holme Moss in the north to Sterndale Moor in the south, and from Hague Bar in the west to Bamford in the east. The population of the borough taken at the 2011 Census was 90,892. The borough is unusual in having two administrative centres for its council, High Peak Borough Council; the offices are in Buxton and Glossop. Other towns include Chapel-en-le-Frith, Hadfield, New Mills and Whaley Bridge. Under current local government restructuring plans it is planned that the district will be abolished in 2028, with its area forming part of a new Derbyshire North unitary authority.

High Peak was the name of a hundred of the ancient county of Derbyshire covering a larger area than the current district with the hundred including the town of Bakewell and extending just to the west of Matlock. It may have derived its name from the ancient Forest of High Peak, a royal hunting reserve administered by William Peverel, a favourite of William I, who was based at Peak Castle. High Peak contains much of the Peak District National Park. The district contains the highest point in Derbyshire, Kinder Scout, which stands at 636m (2,087 ft) above sea level. Its settlements act as commuter centres for people who work in the surrounding counties and other parts of Derbyshire, owing to its proximity to Cheshire, Greater Manchester, South Yorkshire, Staffordshire and West Yorkshire.

== Creation ==
The borough was formed on 1 April 1974, covering the area of six former districts, which were abolished:

- Buxton Municipal Borough
- Chapel-en-le-Frith Rural District
- Glossop Municipal Borough
- New Mills Urban District
- Tintwistle Rural District (which had been in the administrative county of Cheshire)
- Whaley Bridge Urban District

== Neighbouring districts ==
The borough adjoins the metropolitan boroughs of Sheffield and Barnsley in South Yorkshire, Kirklees in West Yorkshire, the districts of Derbyshire Dales, Cheshire East and Staffordshire Moorlands, and the Stockport, Tameside and Oldham metropolitan boroughs in Greater Manchester. The Metropolitan Borough of Oldham is only bordered by high moorland near Black Hill and is not accessible by road.

== Main settlements ==
Map of High Peak

There are five main areas of settlement in the borough: around Buxton in the south west, around New Mills in the west, around Glossop in the north west, around Whaley Bridge and Chapel-en-le-Frith in the central part of the borough, and the Hope Valley in the east. The northern part of the borough is close to the Manchester urban area.

Settlements in the borough include:

- Ashopton
- Bamford
- Brough and Shatton
- Buxton
- Buxworth
- Castleton
- Chapel-en-le-Frith
- Charlesworth
- Chinley
- Chisworth
- Crowden
- Derwent
- Dove Holes
- Edale
- Fernilee
- Furness Vale
- Gamesley
- Glossop
- Hadfield
- Hayfield
- Hope
- Horwich End
- New Mills
- Old Glossop
- Padfield
- Peak Forest
- Peak Dale
- Rowarth
- Sparrowpit
- Taxal
- Tintwistle
- Thornhill
- Whaley Bridge
- Woodhead

== National Trust ==
The National Trust is a major landowner in the district, owning extensive tracts of moorland and a number of farms, including some in Edale. Features of the Trust's High Peak Estate include Kinder Scout, Odin Mine and Mam Tor.

== Freedom of the Borough ==
The following people and military units have received the Freedom of the Borough of High Peak.

=== Individuals ===
- John Pritchard: 15 November 2022.

=== Military Units ===
- The Worcestershire and Sherwood Foresters Regiment: 1974.
- The Mercian Regiment: 18 December 2007.
- The Royal British Legion (6 local branches): 7 November 2018.

== Media ==
For television, the area is served by BBC North West and ITV Granada broadcasting from the Winter Hill transmitter. Some eastern parts of the High Peak such as Hope Valley are served by BBC Yorkshire and ITV Yorkshire broadcasting from the Emley Moor transmitter.

Radio stations for the area are:

- BBC Radio Manchester on 95.1 MHz FM (covering Glossop, Chapel-en-le-Frith, Hadfield, New Mills and Whaley Bridge).
- BBC Radio Derby on 96.0 MHz FM (covering Buxton) and 95.3 MHz FM (for Hope Valley).
- Greatest Hits Radio Derbyshire (High Peak) on 103.3 MHz FM, 106.4 MHz FM, and 106.6 MHz FM.

Local newspapers are the Buxton Advertiser, Peak Advertiser and Glossop Chronicle.

== See also ==
- High Peak Borough Council elections
