= Woodhead Tunnel =

Former railway tunnel in Northern England

Woodhead Tunnels
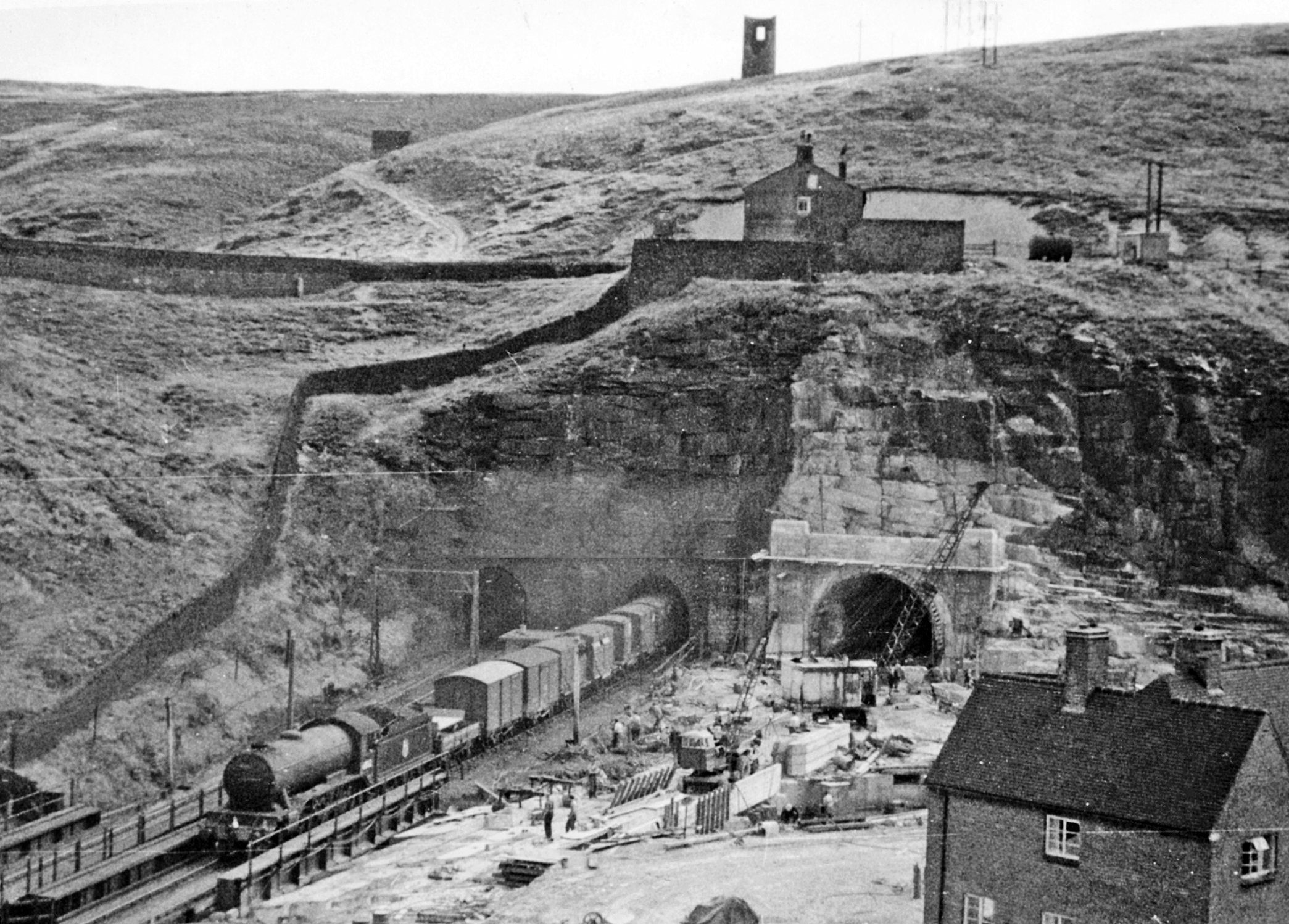
- The western portals of the Woodhead tunnels in 1953. On the left, a train emerges from one of the original tunnels. Tunnel 3 is under construction on the right.

Overview
- Line: Woodhead Line
- Location: Northern England

Operation
- Work began: 1837 (tunnel 1)
- Opened: 1845 (tunnel 1); 1853 (tunnel 2); 1953 (tunnel 3)
- Closed: 1981

Technical
- Length: 3 miles (4.8 km)
- Track gauge: 4 ft 8 1/2 in (1,435 mm)

Route map
- Location of the tunnel within the Peak District

The Woodhead Tunnels are three parallel trans-Pennine 3-mile-long (4.8 km) railway tunnels on the Woodhead Line, a former major rail link from Manchester to Sheffield in Northern England. The western portals of the tunnels are at Woodhead in Derbyshire and the eastern portals are at Dunford Bridge, near Penistone, South Yorkshire.

The first tunnel, Woodhead 1 was constructed by the Sheffield, Ashton-under-Lyne and Manchester Railway. Work on the tunnel commenced in 1837. It was designed by the railway engineer Charles Vignoles, who was later substituted by the civil engineer Joseph Locke. When opened in 1845, Woodhead 1 was one of the world's longest railway tunnels and the first trans-Pennine tunnel.

Woodhead 2 was completed in 1853. Both tunnels were difficult to maintain because of their narrowness and heavy traffic, estimated to be around 250 trains per day in either direction. As both tunnels were too narrow to allow for electrification, it was decided to construct a third tunnel in the 1950s. Woodhead 3 opened in 1953, almost 100 years after Woodhead 2.

Although the Hope Valley Line was recommended for closure in the Beeching Report, instead, the government decided to cease passenger services on the Woodhead line, allegedly due to the high cost of upgrading and modernising the route. In 1970, the last passenger services ran through the tunnel but the line continued to host freight trains. The last train passed through the tunnels in 1981 when the line was closed.

The tunnels are maintained and now used for other purposes. They are owned by National Grid plc, which used Woodhead 1 and 2 to carry power cables and, in 2008, controversially installed cables in Woodhead 3, which would create difficulties in reinstating rail services and was resisted by a sizeable campaign.

== History ==
=== Woodhead 1 ===
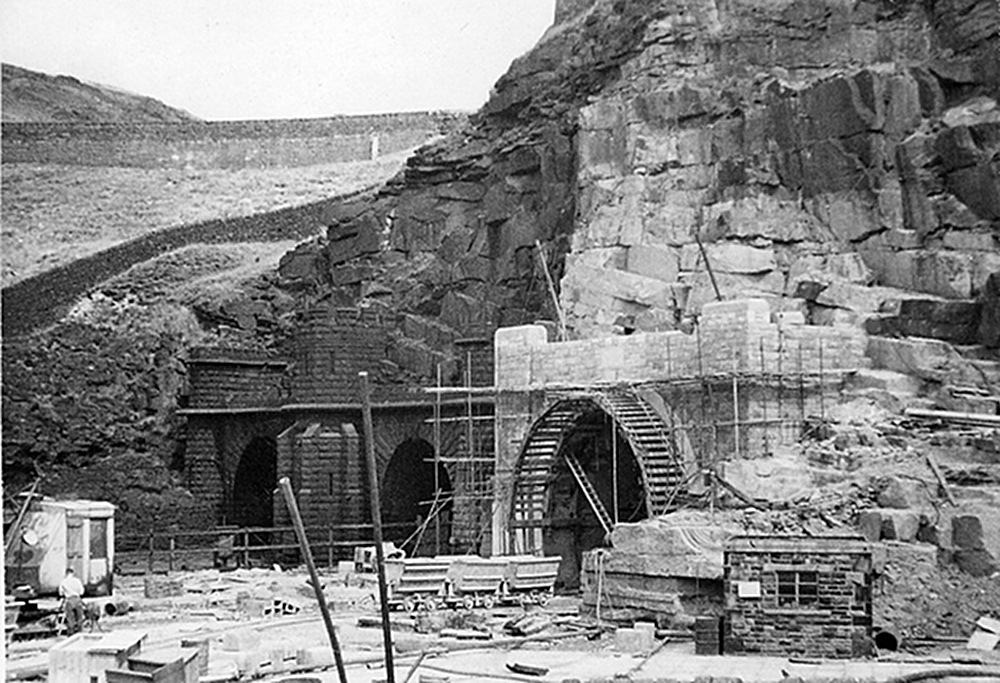
The western portals of Woodhead 1 & 2 in the background, with Woodhead 3 under construction in the foreground, 1953

The first Woodhead Tunnel, also referred to as the south tunnel, was undertaken by the Sheffield, Ashton-under-Lyne and Manchester Railway (SA&MR) company. Work commenced as soon as the line had obtained its act of incorporation in Parliament in 1837 and work on the tunnel commenced in October 1838, although its design was not finalised until April 1839.

Charles Vignoles was appointed engineer by the SA&MR. He surveyed the route between Sheffield and Manchester, recognising the necessity of the Woodhead Tunnel. Vignoles was responsible for the tunnel's design and specification and was involved in other activities for the company, including fundraising. His decision to use his own resources to purchase shares under an alleged understanding that he would not have to pay the full price led to controversy; he resigned from his position in 1838.

The line of the railway was marked over the ridge and five vertical shafts were sunk. From the shaft bases, a horizontal drift was driven along the line. Although sufficient land had been purchased for the construction of a pair of tunnels, it was decided that only one would be built. The tunnel's bore passed through ground largely composed of Millstone Grit interspersed with argillaceous shale and softer sandstone on a gradient of 1 in 201, rising toward the east. Wires were suspended down each shaft from which the centre line was determined by means of a theodolite. The accuracy was such that the drifts lined up with less than three inches of error.

After Vignoles withdrew, the civil engineer Joseph Locke took over as a consultant and re-evaluated the project. The estimated costs were doubled from the £98,467 figure produced by Vignoles to around £200,000 and contractors were provided with new, highly detailed specifications. Locke supervised the construction and prepared contingencies. Soon after taking over, he reported that the amount of water being encountered required more powerful pumps. Although the number of people employed reached 1,500, generally there were around 400 in the tunnel because of limited space in which to work. It was estimated that around 157 tons of gunpowder were consumed during blasting, while over 8 million tons of water were pumped out during construction. The first tunnel was completed during 1845.

When completed, Woodhead 1 was one of the world's longest railway tunnels at 3 miles 13 yards (4,840 m). It was the first trans-Pennine railway tunnel to be built, preceding the Standedge and Totley Tunnels which are slightly longer. The tunnel had cost roughly £200,000 (equivalent to £21,030,000 in 2025) to build. The human cost was high: 30 people lost their lives, 200 workers were maimed and 450 suffered some form of injury in the harsh working conditions.

Woodhead 1 is in worse condition than Woodhead 2; it has suffered several collapses and is unsuitable for cabling or transport purposes.

=== Woodhead 2 ===
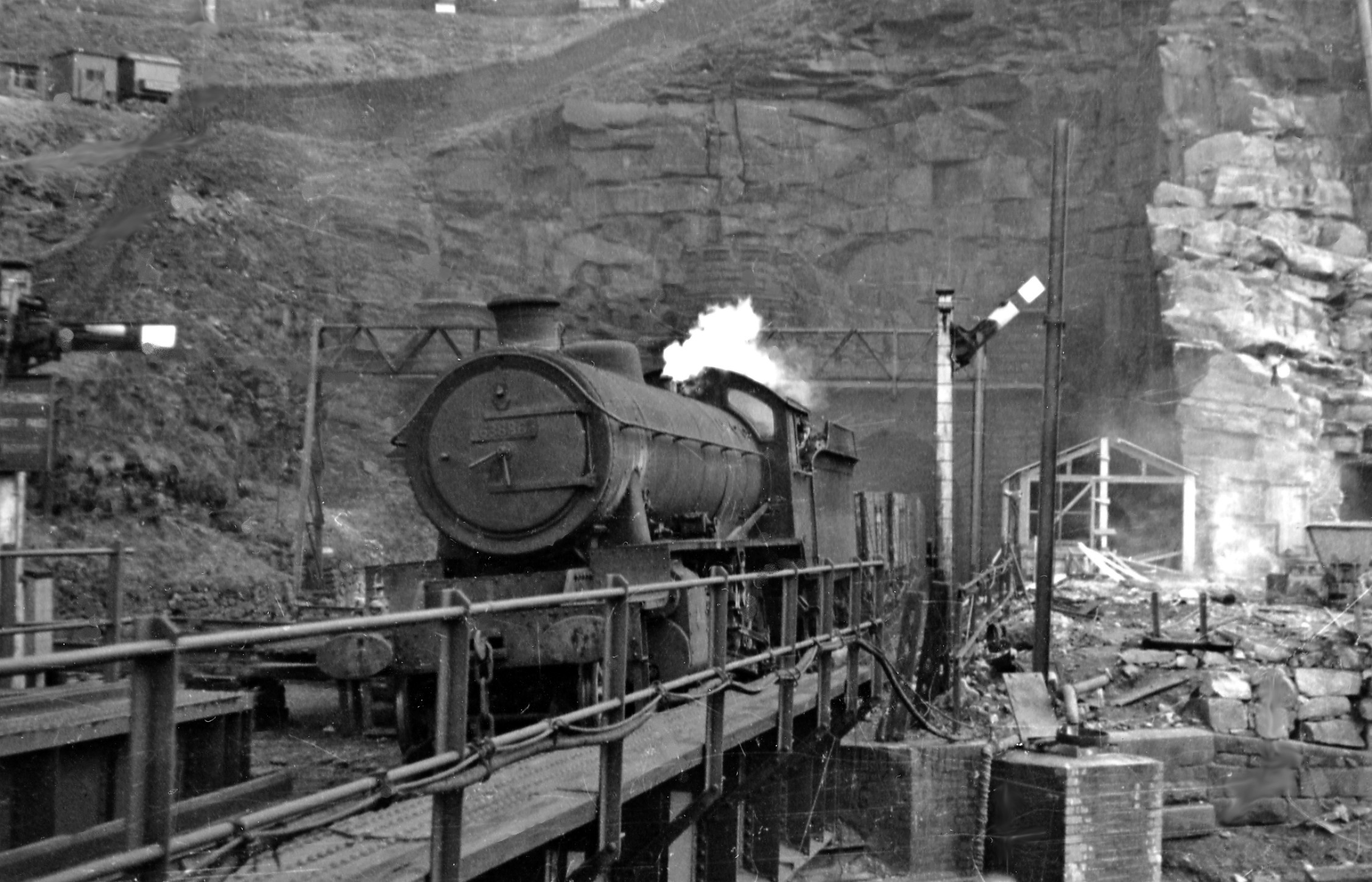
A coal train emerging from Woodhead Tunnel, in April 1950

The second bore, also referred to as the north tunnel, was undertaken by the Manchester, Sheffield and Lincolnshire Railway. Its construction was sped up by the decision to construct 25 side access connections from Woodhead 1, in anticipation of a second bore. Although more care was exercised during its construction, in regards to safety conditions, an outbreak of cholera amongst the workforce, in 1849, resulted in 28 deaths. In January 1852, a bulge was discovered in the tunnel wall in the centre section and had to be rebuilt. Later that year, Woodhead 2 was completed.

Soon after opening, the twin tunnels saw heavy use by steam trains, an average of 250 trains per day in each direction. Traffic had a huge effect on the economy of the route well into the 1950s. The tunnels acquired a negative reputation. It was claimed that they provided a poor operating environment and were difficult to maintain, partially caused by the level of traffic.

Train crews described the tunnels as "hell holes" because of their narrow bores, which were claustrophobic and sooty. The decision to electrify the route during the 1950s was partially made to eliminate the emissions produced by steam and diesel traction. The tunnels were too narrow to accommodate the overhead line equipment (OLE) necessary for the route's electrification and it was decided to close both tunnels in 1953, after the completion of the larger Woodhead 3 tunnel.

Since 1963, Woodhead 2 has been used by National Grid plc to carry the trans-Pennine 400 kV electricity link under the Peak District National Park. A 2 ft (610 mm) narrow gauge railway has been built inside the tunnel for service engineers. In January 2008, work started to transfer the electric cable from the north tunnel to Woodhead 3.

=== Woodhead 3 ===
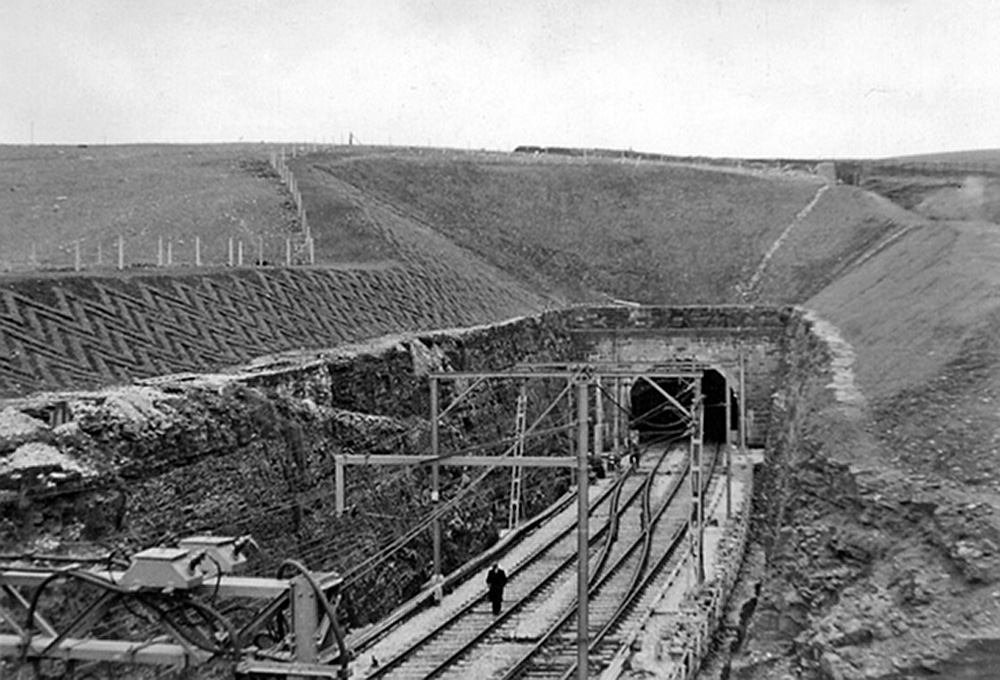
The eastern portal of Woodhead 3 shortly before opening in 1954

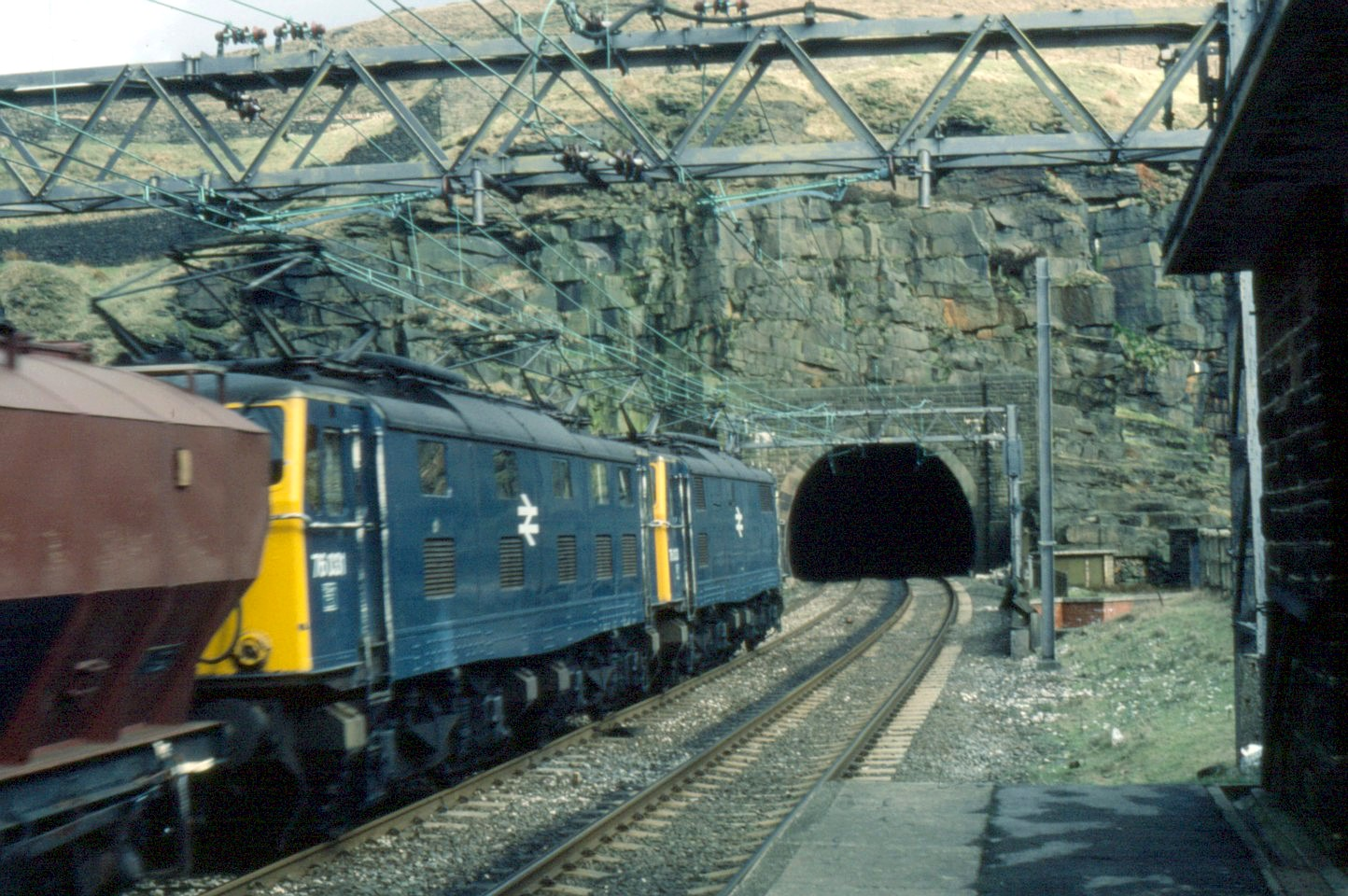
A train about to enter the western portal of Woodhead 3, shortly before closure in 1981

Woodhead 3 was substantially longer than the other two, at 3 miles 66 yards (4.888 km). It was bored for the overhead electrification of the route, a project commonly known as the Manchester–Sheffield–Wath electrification. The line was electrified at 1,500 V DC. It was designed by Sir William Halcrow & Partners. Its height of 7.6 metres (25 ft) was dictated by the requirements of the Ministry of Transport.

Woodhead 3's construction was not without challenge. Two roof collapses occurred in 1951, both around the same area. To resolve this weakness, a series of ribbed arches were installed in this section. Reinforced concrete lining, of 530 mm (21 in) minimum thickness, was installed throughout the tunnel and an adjacent bypass tunnel was built to improve access and ventilation. The new bore is separated from the nearest tunnel by 21.4 m (70 ft). This close proximity was advantageous as it proved convenient during track laying. The old tunnels presented an operational benefit, as water continued to seep into Woodhead 3's predecessors, the water content of the surrounding rock was lowered, resulting in less infiltration into the new tunnel.

Work on the new tunnel was completed in 1953. Woodhead 3 was officially opened by transport minister Alan Lennox-Boyd on 3 June 1954. It had cost £4.3 million (equivalent to £107,720,000 in 2025). Six people lost their lives during the work.

In the 1960s, a proposal was made to close the tunnel to railway traffic and use it to carry a section of a Manchester to Sheffield motorway through the Pennines. Only a short section of the M67 motorway was built, within Greater Manchester, and Woodhead 3 was never used by road traffic.

During 1970, the final passenger services ran through the tunnel. The last train was run in July 1981.

During 2007, National Grid plc, the owners of the tunnels, proposed moving electricity cables from the older tunnels to Woodhead 3. This sparked controversy as Woodhead 3 would no longer be available for reuse by railway traffic in the future. Protest groups advocated for it to be reserved to facilitate any such reopening.

== Location of portals ==
Woodhead entrance	0	53.4957°N 1.8298°W
Air vent 1	1.13 miles	53.5038°N 1.8060°W
Air vent 2	2.35 miles	53.5124°N 1.7802°W
Dunford Bridge entrance	3 miles	53.5174°N 1.7655°W

== Proposals to re-open the tunnel for rail traffic ==
In 1999, the prospective Central Railway released a proposal to the Woodhead Tunnel as part of a scheme to link Liverpool and London with a new large-gauge freight line along the trackbed of the Great Central Main Line.

In 2002, the Trans-Pennine Rail Group, composed of county councils, unitary authorities, passenger transport executives (PTE) and the Peak District National Park Authority provided evidence to the Transport Select Committee that identified interest from bidders for the Trans-Pennine rail franchise in reopening the Woodhead route. In 2007 the Trans-Pennine Rail Group was dissolved and its responsibilities transferred to the Northern Way and the North West Rail Campaign.

In July 2003, the Greater Manchester Branch of the Chartered Institute of Logistics and Transport, presented evidence to a parliamentary select committee, stating that Arriva had an interest in reopening the Woodhead Line as part of a bid for the Trans-Pennine rail franchise.

In 2006, 'Translink' proposed that the tunnel be reopened as a route for rail freight. The proposal was supported by groups who were opposing the construction of the proposed Longdendale Bypass, a £180 million scheme for avoiding Mottram in Longdendale, Hollingworth and Tintwistle. The tunnel was an alternative means of handling some of the traffic and reducing the need for the bypass.

== Current situation ==
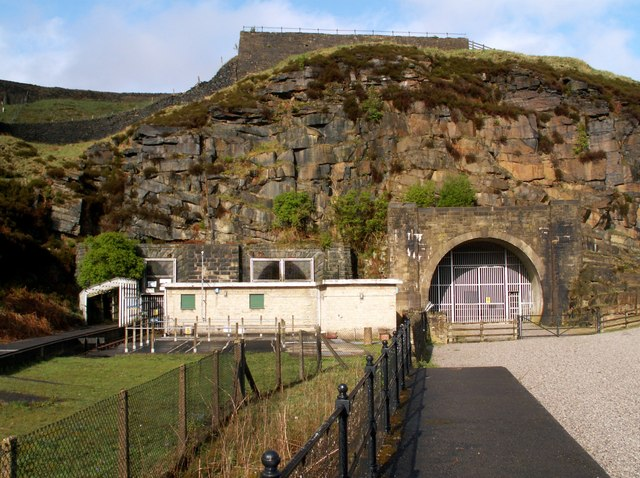
The western portals of the Woodhead Tunnels in 2008, from the former Woodhead railway station. Bores 1 & 2 on left, behind platform; bore 3 on right.

Woodhead 1 is in poor condition and unused. For several decades, Woodhead 2 has carried electrical cables for the National Grid which by the early 2000s were coming to the end of their operational life. The National Grid proposed installing new cables in Woodhead 3 which would prevent its restoration for rail traffic. The older tunnels are unsuitable for rail traffic, because of their poor state of repair.

In July 2007, the Peak District National Park expressed concern at the plans to place cables in Woodhead 3, observing that it could not be used for rail traffic. In September 2007, the Government Office for the East Midlands indicated that it was unlikely that the route would be used for rail traffic again, and declined to intervene. On 4 December 2007, 57 MPs signed an early day motion in the Commons, brought by Manchester Blackley MP Graham Stringer, expressing concern at laying cables in a tunnel that was viable for rail traffic.

On 18 December, a written answer in the Commons stated that laying cables in the tunnel would not preclude opening the route to rail traffic. On 23 January 2008, the Department for Transport said that only the older tunnels, which were in poor condition, would be available. In December 2007, the Campaign for Better Transport (UK) campaigned to keep Woodhead 3 available for rail traffic.

On 8 January 2008, the "Northern Way", a collaboration between three Northern Regional Development Agencies: Yorkshire Forward, Northwest Regional Development Agency and One NorthEast, called for the government to ensure the potential reuse of Woodhead Tunnels for rail use in the future. The Northern Way had previously published claims that the tunnel's economic benefit could be as much as £10 billion nationally, of which £3.5 billion had been forecast to occur in the North.

On 15 January 2008, around one hundred protesters gathered at the end of the Woodhead Tunnel, protesting against its planned reuse in carrying electricity cables. Around this time, a campaign group, originally named "Save the Woodhead Tunnel", was established; it was renamed "Re-open the Woodhead Tunnel" the following year. On 24 January 2008, preparatory work on the tunnel commenced, although this did not end the objections.

In January 2012, during a debate in parliament, Angela Smith MP called for the reopening of the Woodhead route, but was informed that the line was not a priority as part of the Northern Hub because of capacity available on the Hope Valley Line.

In 2012, Balfour Beatty fitted new electricity cables through the tunnel which were individually laid in concrete and sand insulated ducts at the tunnel exit for connection to the first pylon. Old galvanised steelwork over the River Etherow was removed. The tunnel has a flat concrete floor and concrete-finished walls and ceiling. The cables run down both sides of the tunnel attached to metal framework. Six cables run along each wall, each about 12 inches (300 mm) in diameter with thick insulation and other ducting and cables run along the floor. At the western end, the old concrete and tarmac platforms still stand.

In November 2013, it was decided to seal the Victorian tunnels, following a decision by the government not to purchase them from the National Grid. Transport Minister Stephen Hammond said a new tunnel would be a better option if the route should ever be used again for rail traffic, and that the Hope Valley route had the capacity to accommodate foreseeable growth.

== See also ==
- Longdendale
- Woodhead line
- Longdendale Bypass
- M67 motorway
- Manchester–Sheffield–Wath electric railway
- Manchester, Sheffield and Lincolnshire Railway

== Sources ==
- Bain, Simon (1986) Railroaded! (Battle for Woodhead Pass), London, Faber and Faber. ISBN 0-571-13909-4
- Dow, G., (1959) Great Central, Volume One: The Progenitors (1813–1863) , Shepperton: Ian Allan Ltd.
