= A628 road =

Road in Northern England

A628

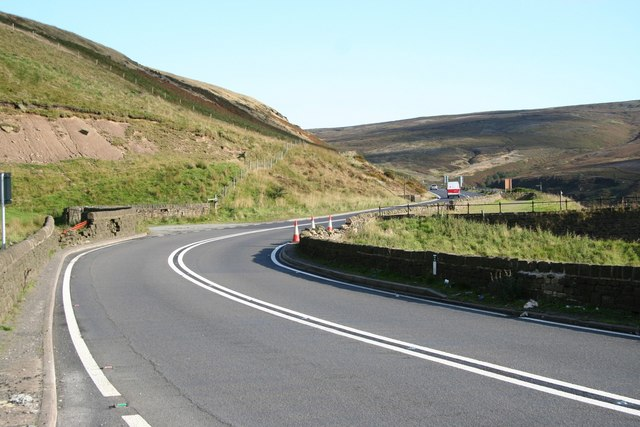
- At Ironbower Moss, between Crowden and Langsett

Route information
- Length: 38.2 mi (61.5 km)

Major junctions
- West end: Mottram Moor, Hollingworth (A57 near M67); 53.4609°N 1.9961°W
- A57 A6024 A616 A629; M1 A635; A61 A633 A6195 A638 A639
- East end: Pontefract (A639); 53.6807°N 1.3133°W

Location
- Country: United Kingdom
- Primary destinations: Barnsley

Road network
- Roads in the United Kingdom; Motorways; A and B road zones
← A627	→ A629

The A628 is a major road connecting Greater Manchester and South Yorkshire in Northern England. It crosses the Pennine hills by way of Longdendale and the Woodhead Pass in the Peak District National Park. The road's altitude and exposure to bad weather create problems in winter and the road is sometimes closed due to snow or high winds.

== Route ==
The road starts to the east of Manchester at the end of the M67 motorway and A57 road. It passes through Mottram in Longdendale, Hollingworth and Tintwistle and then through Longdendale in the Peak District National Park to Crowden and Salter's Brook Bridge where the road leaves Derbyshire and enters Barnsley Metropolitan Borough. From its summit the road descends through Millhouse Green, Thurlstone, around Penistone before joining the M1 motorway at Junction 37.

From the M1 junction the road passes through Barnsley, Cudworth, Brierley and around Hemsworth (bypassed) to Ackworth Moor Top ending in Pontefract at a junction with the A639 road. The section from Ackworth Moor Top Roundabout through Ackworth has a 7.5 tonne weight limit because of a number of tight bends and narrow sections.

The Woodhead Pass section, while not formally defined, covers the section of the road that passes through the national park.

== History ==
The A628 originated as a salt road accessing what was a valuable preservative in the 18th century. The route was used to transport salt from mines in north Cheshire to towns in Yorkshire. Construction of the western section of the road to Saltersbrook in the Longendale valley began in 1732 and the section to the east towards Doncaster opened in 1740. The road was improved and reconstructed as a turnpike road in 1844.

A modern section of the A628 between Barnsley and Pontefract runs on the line of the former Hull and Barnsley Railway.

== Traffic ==
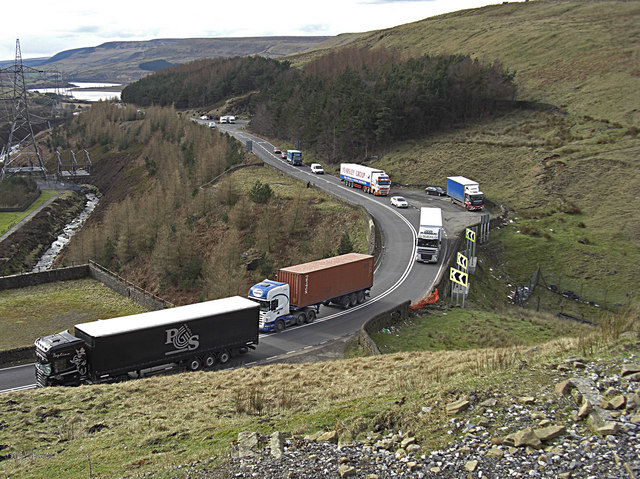
The A628 Woodhead Pass is frequently congested and dangerous owing to the proliferation of HGVs.

The road's altitude and its exposure to the weather over the Woodhead Pass creates problems in winter when it can be closed because of snow or high winds. The high altitude of the pass and its winding, narrow route through the Pennine hills makes travelling difficult, and the road is often closed. The alternative trans-Pennine route is a lengthy detour via the M62, 15 miles to the north. High winds along the pass cause HGVs to overturn or jack-knife, creating obstructions, and ice can make the road "like a skating rink".

In 2015, Highways England proposed a £6 billion scheme to build a combined road and rail tunnel under Woodhead, which would be the longest tunnel in Europe. The plans were scaled back to involve a partially tunnelled scheme. Drivers are unimpressed with the slow progress in upgrading the pass, complaining the road "is currently about 30 years behind the times".

The Longdendale Bypass has been promoted as a project to remove traffic from the villages of Mottram, Hollingworth and Tintwistle, which lie between the M67 and the Woodhead Pass. The scheme has been perennially controversial. As of 2017, the project has no definitive start date. THere are also proposals to build a Trans-Pennine road tunnel beneath the Peak District, as a way to improve transport links between Manchester and Sheffield, and to reduce the volume of traffic using the A628 to traverse the national park.

== Culture ==
The A628 is mentioned in the 2001 Human League track "The Snake", which suggests it as an alternative route from the M62 or A57 Snake Pass. The road features in the film Hell is a City (1960) when robbers stop to dispose of a woman's body alongside the road.

== See also ==
- M67 motorway
