= Woodhead line =

Former Manchester to Sheffield railway line

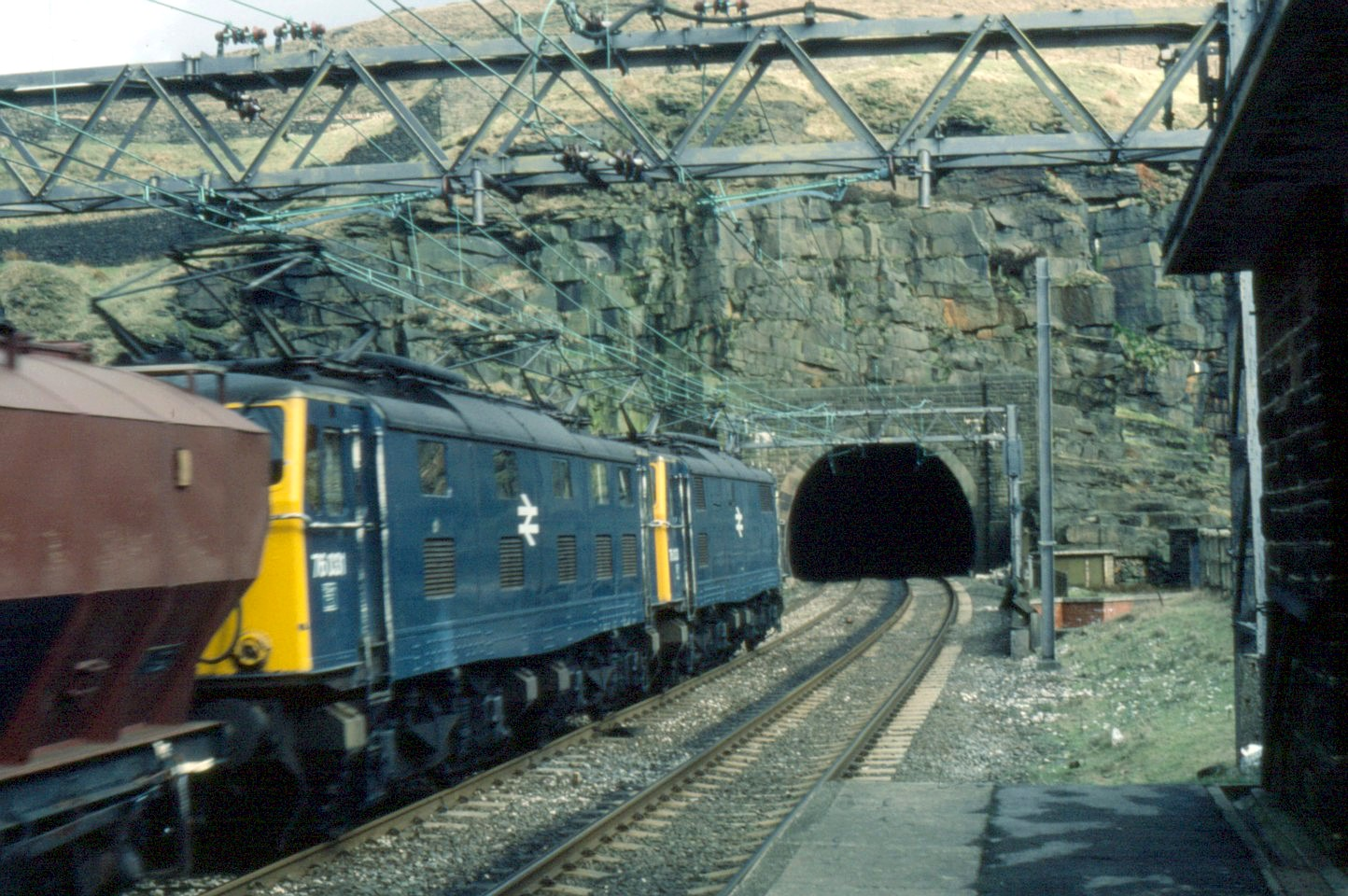
- An electric freight train headed by two Class 76s, about to enter Woodhead Tunnel in 1981

Overview
- Status: Partially open
- Locale: South Yorkshire, Cheshire, Derbyshire and Lancashire
- Termini: Sheffield: Rotherwood exchange sidings / Wath marshalling yard; Manchester: London Road (1845–1960) Piccadilly (1960–70)

Service
- Type: Main line
- System: National Rail Network
- Services: 3
- Rolling stock: Class 76; Class 77; Class 506

History
- Opened: 1845
- Closed: 1970 (passengers) and 1981 (goods)

Technical
- Num of tracks: 2
- Track gauge: 4 ft 8 1/2 in (1,435 mm) standard gauge
- Electrification: 1,500 V DC Overhead line
Route map
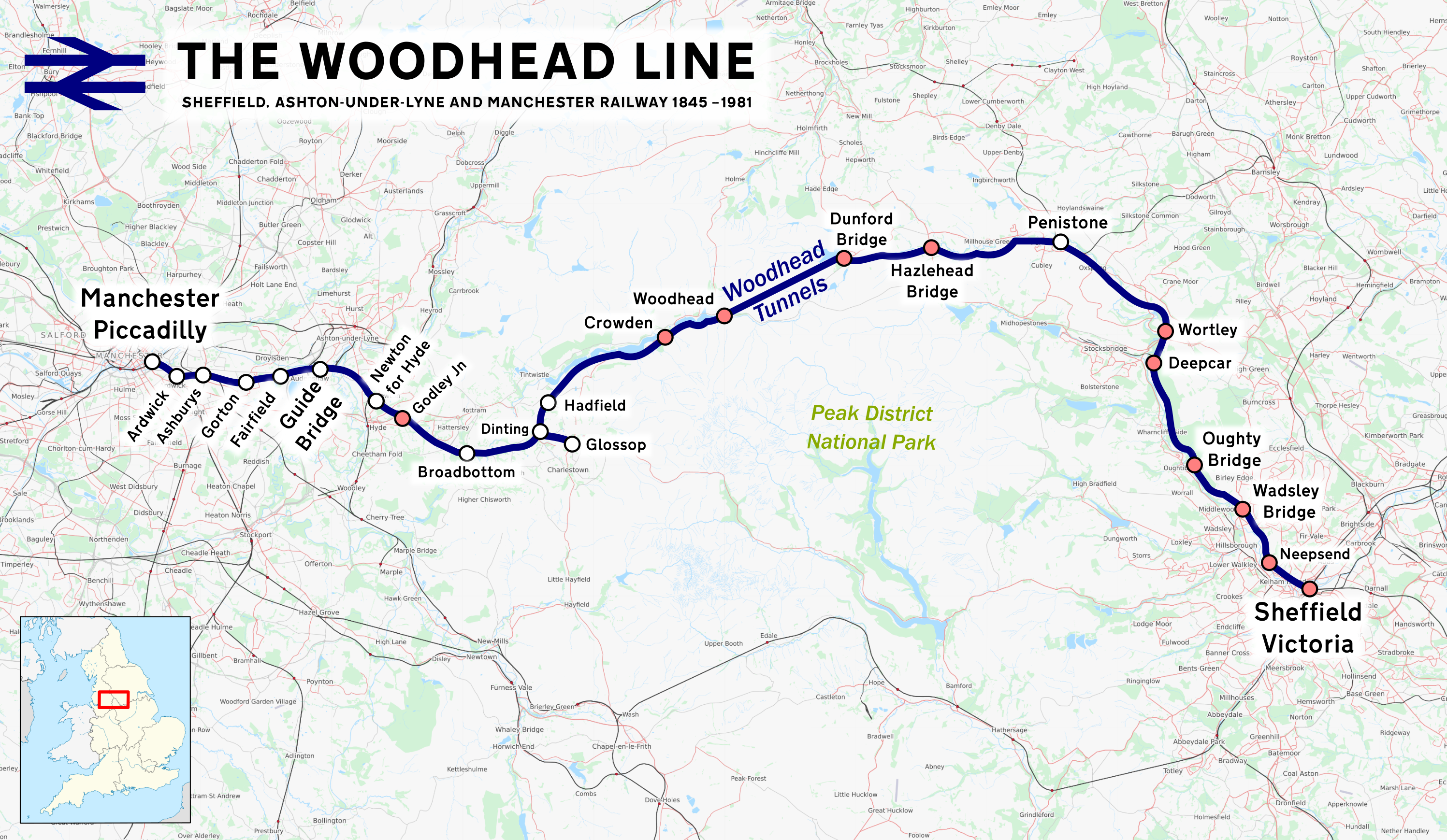
(Click to expand)

The Woodhead line was a railway line linking Sheffield, Penistone and Manchester in the north of England. A key feature of the route is the passage under the high moorlands of the northern Peak District through the Woodhead Tunnels. The line was electrified in 1953 and closed between Hadfield and Penistone in 1981.

The Manchester to Glossop/Hadfield section is still in operation; east of the Pennines, the vicinity of Penistone is still in operation and until 2024 the Sheffield to Deepcar section was still open, although for freight only. The track has been lifted on other sections and much of the trackbed now forms part of the Trans-Pennine Trail and National Cycle Route 62.

== Route ==
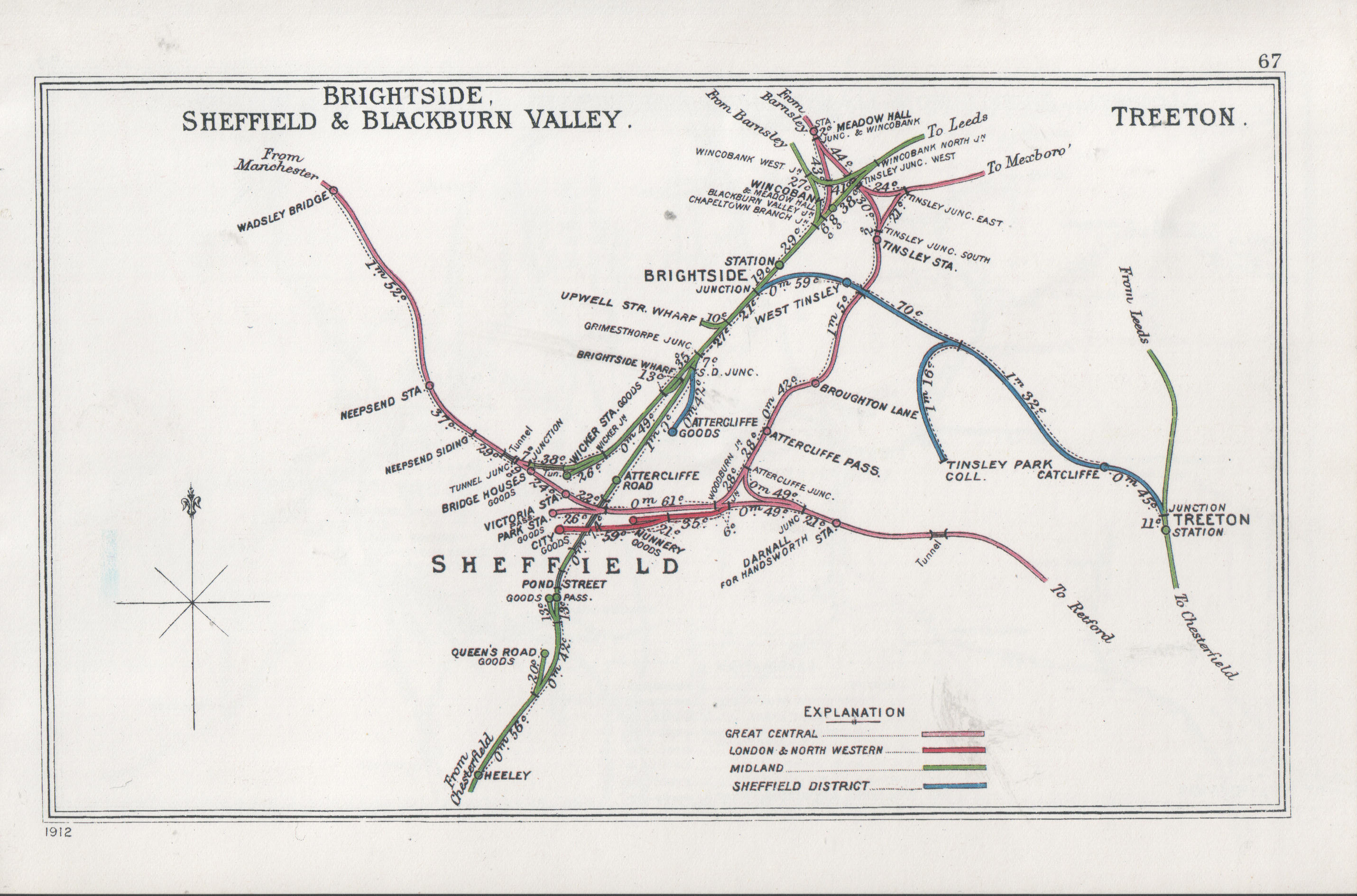
Railway Clearing House map showing the Wadsley Bridge to Sheffield Victoria section of the route

The route from Manchester to Sheffield was 41 1/2 miles (66.8 km) with stops at Gorton, Guide Bridge, Newton, Godley Junction, Broadbottom, Glossop and Dinting, Glossop Central, Hadfield, Crowden, Woodhead, Dunford Bridge, Hazlehead Bridge, Penistone, Wortley, Deepcar, Oughtibridge, Wadsley Bridge and Neepsend. Services still run from Manchester to Glossop and Hadfield; trains also run from Sheffield to Penistone (via a different route), continuing onwards to Huddersfield. The section from Deepcar to Sheffield is currently used for goods.

== History ==
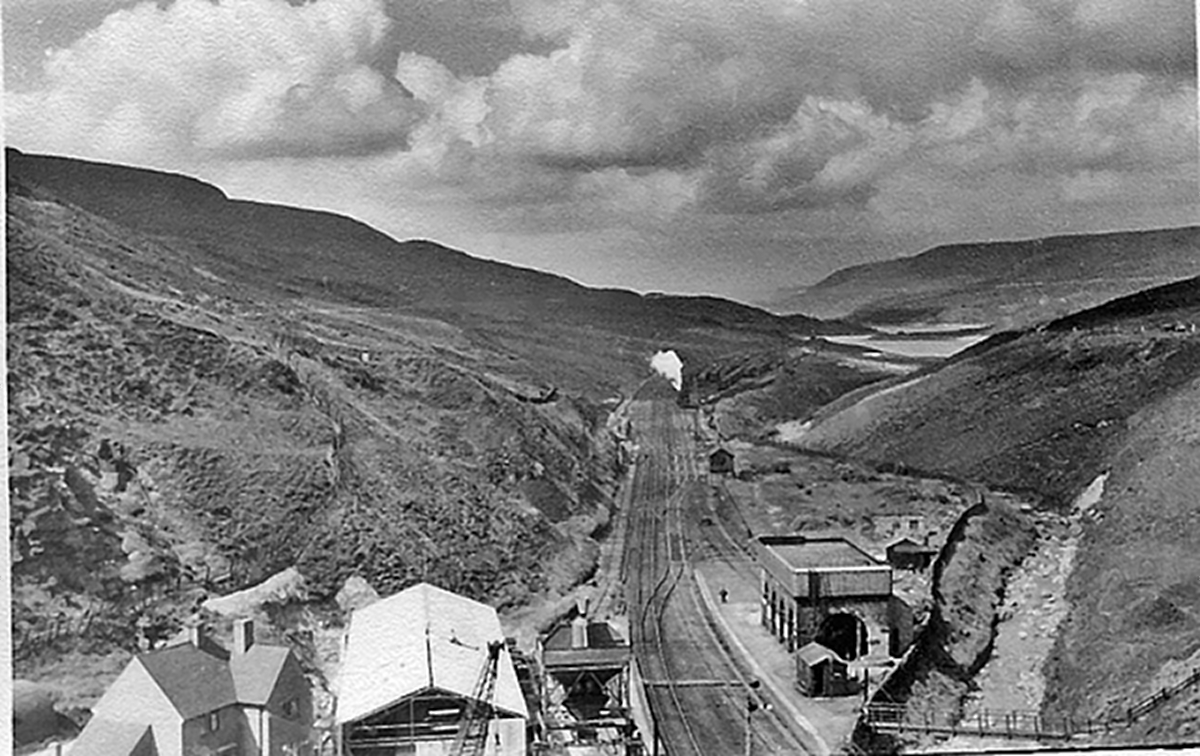
The line in 1951 before electrification, looking westwards from above Woodhead Tunnel. Woodhead railway station is visible in the foreground.

=== Construction ===
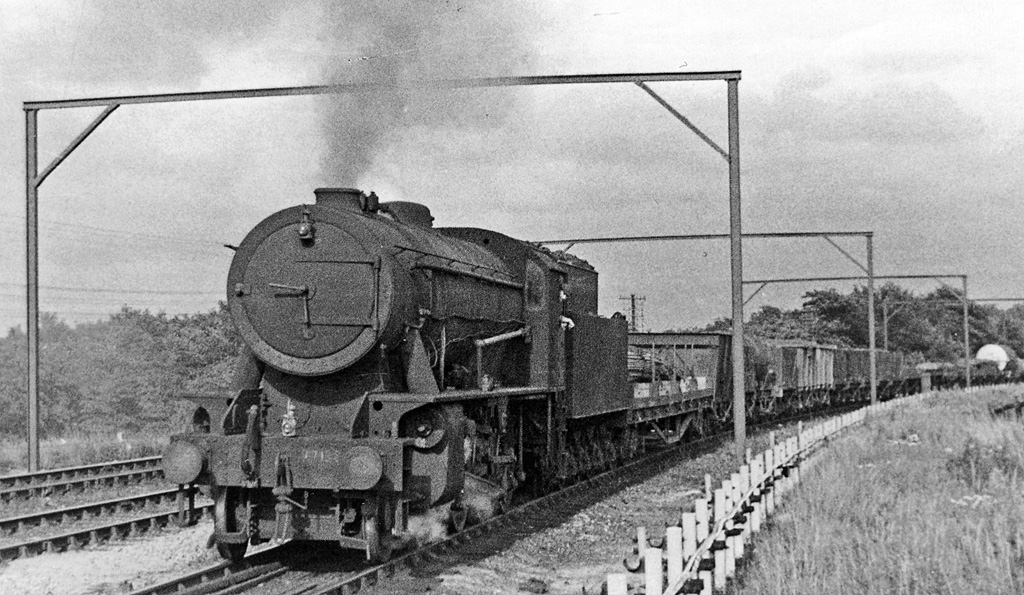
Goods train pulled by WD Austerity 2-8-0 near West Silkstone Junction in 1950

The line opened in 1845. It was built by the Sheffield, Ashton-under-Lyne and Manchester Railway with Joseph Locke as its engineer. In 1847, the railway merged with the Sheffield and Lincolnshire Junction Railway, the Great Grimsby and Sheffield Junction Railway and the Grimsby Docks Company to form the Manchester, Sheffield and Lincolnshire Railway; it changed its name to the Great Central Railway (GCR) in 1897. Ownership passed to the LNER in 1923 and, finally, to British Railways Eastern Region in 1948.

The original eastern terminus of the line was at Bridgehouses railway station. By the time of the creation of the Manchester, Sheffield and Lincolnshire Railway in 1847, the railway station at Bridgehouses had been outgrown. A 0.6-mile (1 km) extension including the Wicker Arches viaduct, engineered by John Fowler, was constructed to the new Sheffield Victoria station, which opened in 1851.

Both goods and passenger traffic were very heavy; therefore, some sections of the line were quadrupled.

=== Electrification ===
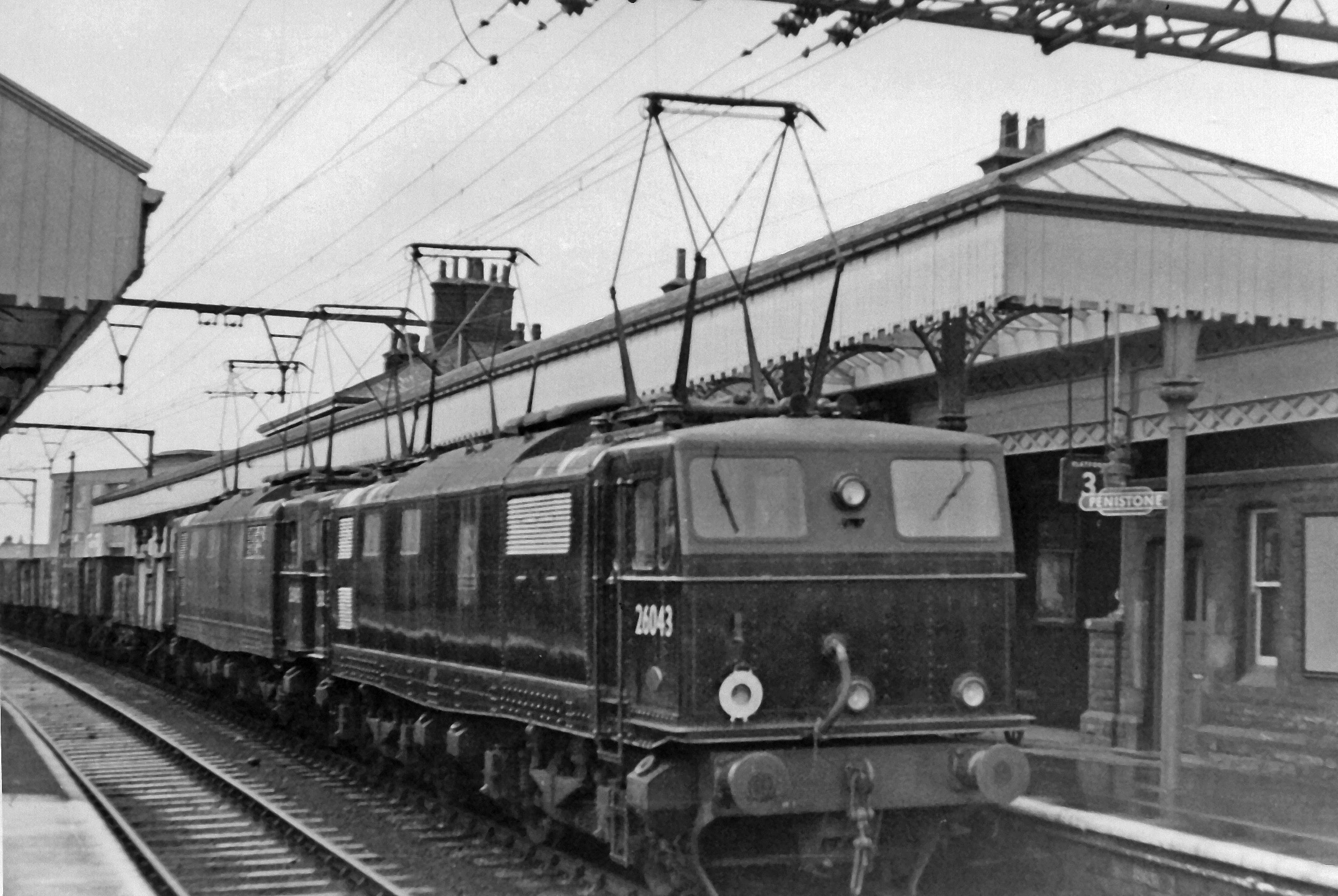
Electric locomotives at Penistone railway station in 1954

Electrification was first mooted by the Great Central Railway, owing to the difficulties of operating heavy steam-hauled coal trains on the Penistone–Wath section (the Worsborough branch); a line with steep gradients and several tunnels. Definitive plans were drawn up by the LNER in 1936; many of the gantries for the catenary were erected before the Second World War.

The Second World War prevented progress on electrification, but the plans were restarted immediately after the war; however, this time with plans for a new double-track Woodhead Tunnel. This third Woodhead Tunnel was constructed to replace the twin single-bore Victorian tunnels, which had been damaged by years of smoke from steam engines. A second Thurgoland Tunnel was also required, as the existing tunnel had inadequate clearance for twin electrified lines.

The Manchester–Sheffield–Wath electrification project was finally completed in 1955, using overhead wires energised at 1,500 volts DC. Whilst this was tried and tested technology (and is still standard in the Netherlands), the comparatively low voltage meant that a large number of electricity substations and heavy cabling would be required. It also made regenerative braking by transfer of power from descending to ascending trains in the same section of line comparatively straightforward. The main contractor for the electrification work was Bruce Peebles & Co. Ltd., Edinburgh. Following technological developments, especially in France, 1.5 kV DC was soon superseded by the later network standard of 25 kV AC. This left the Woodhead line as the only main line in the UK with 1.5 kV DC electrification.

New electric locomotives for the line were constructed at Gorton locomotive works, Manchester. These were the EM1/Class 76, for freight trains and some passenger duties, and EM2/Class 77 locomotives for express passenger trains. Given the steep gradients on the line, the locomotives were able to use regenerative braking on their descent from Woodhead. Rheostatic braking was also later added. Additionally, Class 506 electric multiple units were built for suburban services between Manchester, Glossop and Hadfield. A new depot, Reddish Electric Depot, situated on the Fallowfield Loop line, was built in 1954 to maintain the new locomotives and EMUs.

=== Closure ===
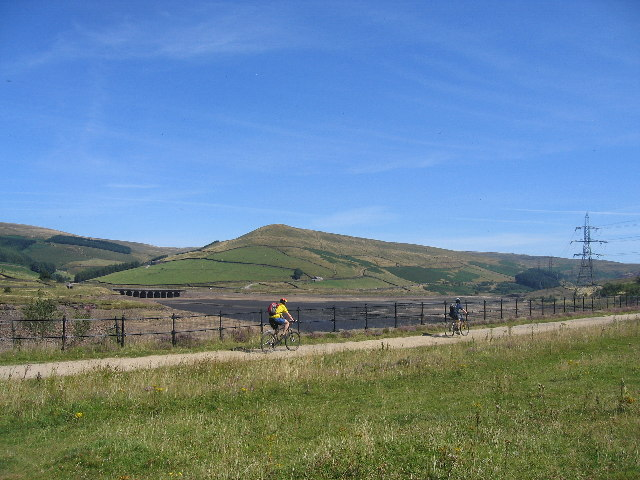
The Longdendale Trail, on the former trackbed between Hadfield and Woodhead

Having seen major investment in the 1950s, the line was controversially closed to passenger traffic between Hadfield and Penistone on 5 January 1970. This was despite the Beeching Report earmarking the Hope Valley Line for closure to passenger services instead. It was determined that the Hope Valley route through Edale would be required to remain open for social and network reasons and would therefore need to handle all Manchester–Sheffield passenger traffic. The Class 77 locomotives, used to haul passenger trains, were sold to the Netherlands Railways, where 1500 V DC electrification was (and still is) the standard.

By the late 1970s, a large part of the remaining freight traffic consisted of coal trains from Yorkshire to Fiddlers Ferry power station near Widnes, which required a change to diesel haulage for the final part of the journey.

By the early 1980s, the combination of alternative available routes, an absence of passenger traffic since 1970 and a downturn in coal traffic across the Pennines, along with a need to eventually expensively upgrade or replace the non-standard electrical supply systems and Class 76 locomotives, resulted in the line's closure east of Hadfield. The last train operated on 18 July 1981 and the line was mothballed. Passenger trains from Huddersfield to Sheffield continued to use the line between Penistone and Sheffield, before being diverted to run via Barnsley in 1983.

The tracks were lifted in the mid-1980s, ending any short-term hopes of reopening. Almost the entire line east of Hadfield has now been lifted, apart from a few short sections shared with other lines, notably at Penistone. The trackbed between Hadfield and the Woodhead Tunnel has currently been adapted as the Longdendale Trail for hikers and cyclists.

=== Possible closure of Woodhead 3 ===
In 2007, National Grid, the present owners of all three of the tunnels, proposed to move electricity cables from the Victorian to the 1953 tunnel. This work started in 2008 and was completed in 2012. This has meant it is now not possible to use the newer tunnel for railway traffic. In 2007, the Peak District National Park and other relevant local bodies provided many reasons why the tunnel should remain available for potential re-opening but, in September 2007, the government declined to intervene in the matter.

=== Surviving sections ===
The suburban passenger service between Manchester, Glossop and Hadfield remains in service, but the electricity supply was converted to standard 25 kV AC overhead in December 1984. The Class 506 EMUs were then withdrawn and replaced by Class 303 EMUs from the Glasgow area.

The Huddersfield line platforms at Penistone railway station remain open, used by the Huddersfield-Sheffield diesel-operated local trains, which traverse the line the short distance between the former Huddersfield Junction and Barnsley Junction.

One other part of the line remained open to traffic, albeit goods, and that is the single line from Woodburn Junction, on the Sheffield–Lincoln line, to Deepcar to serve the Liberty Speciality steel works at Stocksbridge. Freight trains carrying steel products continued using this line between Aldwarke and Stocksbridge until 29 September 2024 when the line was mothballed.

== Proposals for the future ==
In 1967, it was proposed that parts of the route and the Woodhead Tunnel be used as part of a new Manchester to Sheffield motorway. Only a short section of this motorway within Greater Manchester, now known as the M67, was ever built.

In 1999, Central Railway proposed using the Woodhead tunnel as part of an ambitious scheme to connect Liverpool to the Channel Tunnel.

In 2002, the Trans-Pennine Rail Group, a broadly based group of County Councils, Unitary Authorities, Passenger Transport Executives and the Peak District National Park Authority, provided evidence to the Transport Select Committee which identified interest from bidders for the Transpennine rail franchise in reopening the Woodhead route. In 2007, the Transpennine Rail Group was wound up as its work was now being done by the Northern Way and the North West Rail Campaign.

In 2003, the Greater Manchester Branch of the Institute of Logistics and Transport presented evidence to a Parliamentary Select committee mentioning Arriva's interest in opening the Woodhead line and Tunnel as part of their bid for the Transpennine rail franchise.

In 2006, Translink proposed opening the tunnel and the route for rail freight. This proposal is favoured by some groups opposing the construction of the Longdendale Bypass, a controversial £180m bypass for Mottram in Longdendale, Hollingworth and Tintwistle (which is officially known as the A57/A628 Mottram-in-Longdendale, Hollingworth & Tintwistle Bypass).

There are also plans to restore the route from Deepcar to Sheffield, as a double-tracked heritage line called the Don Valley Railway, to link up with the Sheffield Supertram at Nunnery Junction called "Sheffield Don Valley". In 2010, Don Valley Railway Ltd, Sheffield City Council and South Yorkshire Passenger Transport Executive proposed reopening the line to passenger services between Sheffield and Stocksbridge. Stations would be constructed at Stocksbridge, Deepcar, Wharncliffe Side and Oughtibridge with a Sheffield city centre terminus near to the Nunnery Square Supertram stop. The project could cost £4.3 million at a minimum.

On 18 January 2012, during a debate on the proposed Northern Hub (formerly known as the Manchester Rail Hub), Theresa Villiers, the Minister for Rail and Aviation, said "The hon. Member for Penistone and Stocksbridge has again called for the reopening of the Woodhead route. I have to say that was not one that was prioritised as part of the Northern Hub because of the capacity that is still available on the Hope Valley Line."

In 2017, a newly formed company, Grand Northern Group, announced plans to reopen the line to freight traffic as part of a plan for a 'rolling highway' which would carry lorries on freight trains and relieve congestion on the Woodhead Bypass. The plans would see trains running from Bredbury, by J25 of the M60, to Tinsley, near the M1.

In March 2020, a bid was made to the Restoring Your Railway fund to get funds for a feasibility study into reinstating the line between Stocksbridge and Sheffield for passengers. This bid was unsuccessful. However a resubmitted bid was successful and was awarded funding in October 2021.

With the launch of the South Yorkshire People's Network, there are proposals to re-open the line and stations between Sheffield Victoria and Deepcar to tram-trains as part of the South Yorkshire Supertram network, followed by the construction of an extension into Stocksbridge town centre.

== Woodhead line museum ==
In August 2023 it was revealed that the Woodhead Railway Heritage Group has submitted plans to create a museum to celebrate the Manchester to Sheffield rail link. The museum is to be housed in a former signalling and telecommunications building at Guide Bridge railway station. Network Rail has been carrying out renovation work on the building since 2020.

== In popular culture ==
ITV's Coronation Street character Roy Cropper is building a 00 gauge 1960s-era model layout of the line in the flat above his "Roy's Rolls" Cafe. Although mentioned previously, the layout – as yet incomplete – first featured in episode 8345, first aired on 17 March 2014, when the line's Class 76 and Class 77 locos were mentioned.

== See also ==
- Longdendale – a valley through which the line passes
- TransPennine Express – the current train operator between Manchester and Sheffield
- Great Central Main Line – main line of which this route is part of
