= M63 motorway =

Former road designation in Greater Manchester, England

M63

- Map of the M63 in 1998

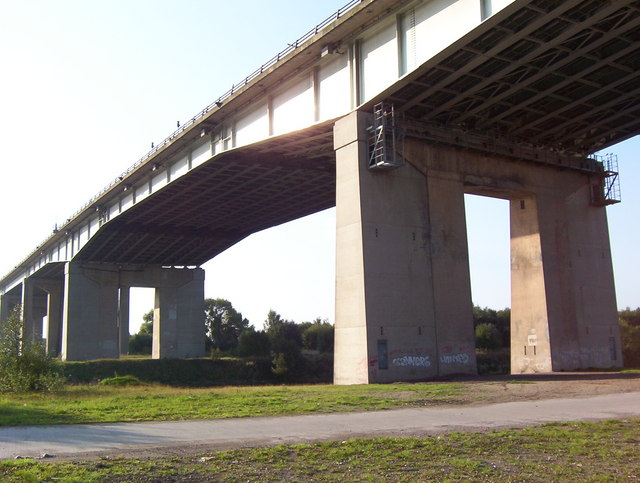
- Barton High Level Bridge carried the M63 across the Manchester Ship Canal

Route information
- Maintained by Highways Agency
- Length: 15 mi (24 km)
- History: Opened as M62: 1960; Renamed M63: 1968; Extended: 1974–1989; Merged into M60: 1998

Major junctions
- Northwest end: Eccles
- J1 → M62 motorway / M602 motorway; J6 → A6144(M) motorway; J10 → M56 motorway; J15 → M66 motorway
- Southeast end: Stockport

Location
- Country: United Kingdom
- Counties: Greater Manchester
- Primary destinations: Manchester; Stockport; Trafford Park

Road network
- Roads in the United Kingdom; Motorways; A and B road zones
← M62	→ M65

The M63 motorway was a major road in the United Kingdom. It was completely renumbered, in 1998, to become a substantial part of the M60 motorway which orbits part of Greater Manchester.

== Formation of the M63 ==
The earliest section of the M63 opened in 1960 as part of the M62 motorway. In anticipation of the 1974 opening of the westward extension of the M62 to Liverpool, the existing section of motorway south of the Eccles Interchange was renumbered as the M63 in 1968.

== Sections of motorway ==
=== Stretford-Eccles bypass ===
This was the first stretch of motorway to be built, opening as the M62. This section runs from the Worsley Interchange (what is now Junction 13 of the M60) as far as the junction with the A56 at Chester Road (now junction 7 of the M60). This section includes the Barton High Level Bridge, a bridge over the Manchester Ship Canal. The embankments for the bridge were the first physical step towards the construction of any motorway in the UK, and this section of motorway was the fourth section of motorway to open in the UK (the first three being the M6 Preston Bypass, the M1/M10/M45 London-Rugby motorway system and the M6 Lancaster Bypass).

Originally the junctions were numbered from 1 at Chester Road to 6 at Worsley. Anticipating the extension of the M62 west to Liverpool in 1974, the section from the Eccles Interchange down to Stretford was redesignated M63 in 1968, but retained the original junction numbers (with the new M62's junctions being renumbered).

In 1974, the junctions in this section were renumbered in the opposite direction, with M63 junction 1 being the Eccles Interchange, running to junction 7 at Chester Road. Originally there was no junction 6.

When the M63 became part of the M60 in 1998, the junctions were renumbered yet again, with M60 junction 12 being the Eccles Interchange, running to junction 7 at Chester Road.

==== Developments in the late 1980s ====
In 1986, work began on two major schemes on the route.

The first involved the construction of the A6144(M) motorway, and a new junction and parallel link roads for the M63. The new junction was numbered as junction 6 (now junction 8 of the M60). The new junction forced the closure of junction 5, which served Urmston and the B5213, due to the small gap between the two.

The second involved the widening of the motorway between the Eccles Interchange and junction 3 (now junction 9 of the M60), including the Barton motorway bridge, which was a major engineering feat.

=== Sale Eastern and Northenden bypass ===
This section of motorway was the third section of the motorway completed, opening as the M63 in September 1974, just 8 months after the section of the Sharston bypass opened. The route largely followed the lightly developed valley and flood plains of the River Mersey, so much of the motorway was on a raised embankment to be clear of potential floodwater. Some of the excavated land for the embankment allowed construction of Sale Water Park, which is adjacent to the motorway. The section of motorway ran from what was then junction 7 at Chester Road (A56) to the recently completed Kingsway Interchange with the A34, what was then junction 10 of the M63 (now junction 3/4 of the M60).

A major free-flow junction was provided for the A5103 Princess Parkway, which provided links towards the city of Manchester and the M56 motorway.

=== Sharston bypass ===
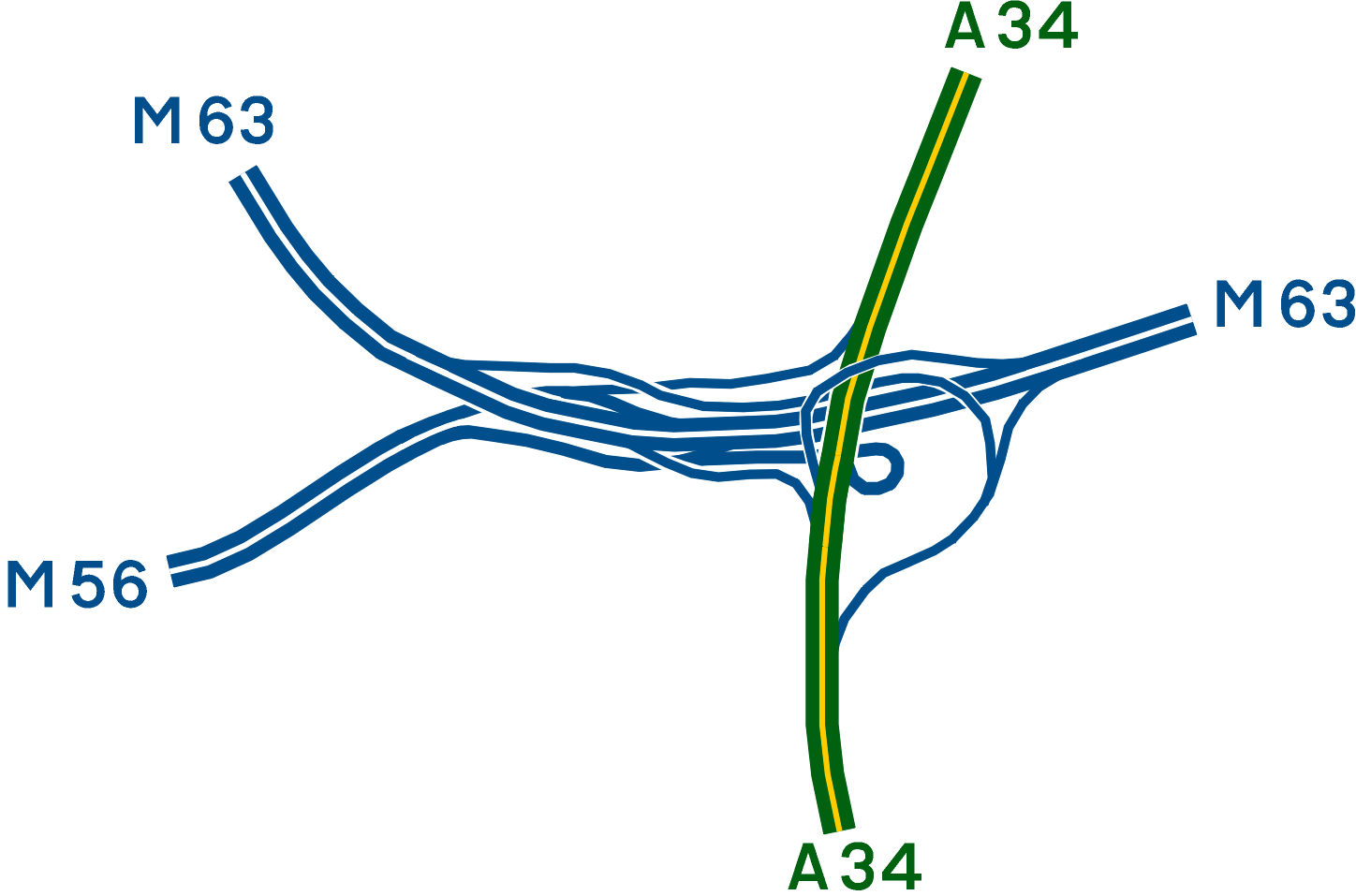
The layout of the Kingsway Interchange which opened in 1974 as part of the Sharston bypass scheme, originally junction 10 of the M63, with the M63 since having been renumbered to M60.

This section of motorway was the second section completed, opening as the M63 (and part as the M56 motorway) in January 1974. It was only a short section, running from what is now junction 2 of the M56 to junction 2 of the M60 (then junction 11 of the M63), but it included a very large free-flow junction providing links to the M56 and A34.

=== Stockport East-West bypass ===
By 1974, the motorway had reached the outskirts of Stockport, running onto the congested A560. The 2.5-mile (4.0 km) Stockport East-West bypass opened to traffic in July 1982 as far as the Portwood Roundabout, then junction 13 of the M63, now junction 27 of the M60.

A significant feature of the bypass is where the motorway passes through two of the arches of the large railway viaduct in the centre of Stockport (one of the largest brick-built structures in Europe). In much of the cutting on the eastern side of the viaduct, red sandstone, on which much of the town is built, can be seen very close to the motorway.

The section of motorway was widened from two to three lane carriageways in 1999 and 2000, around the time when the M63 was renumbered to M60.

=== Portwood to Brinnington ===
This scheme was part of a wider scheme, which involved the construction of a section of what was then the M66 motorway as far as the junction with the A57 and M67 motorway. The M63 was extended eastwards from the Portwood roundabout to a junction at Brinnington, opening in April 1989.

The complete scheme intended for the M63 to continue east from Brinnington to join the A560 at Hattersley, and for the M66 to continue south becoming A6(M) motorway, forming a Stockport North-South bypass. However, the remaining plans for the M63 were subsequently abandoned, and the southern extension, although it still exists at the planning stage in an altered and downgraded form, has yet to be built.

The junction at Brinnington (now junction 25 of the M60, then junction 15 of the M63) left room for both the extension to the east and the A6(M) to be constructed. As a result, the entry to junction 25 in the anti- clockwise direction is from the outside lane, and the carriageways passing through this junction have sharp corners on the M60 main-line, as these were originally intended to be slip roads. In the clockwise direction the motorway is now subject to a reduced speed limit through the junction. The current plans for the North-South bypass do not intend to complete the junction as originally intended, or to utilise stubs of the slip roads already constructed in preparation.

This section was widened from two to three lane carriageways along with the Stockport East-West Bypass in 1999 and 2000.

=== Timeline ===
Northwest	1960	M62	6	–	5	4	3	2	–	1	×									M62	Southeast
Northwest	1968	M62	6	–	5	4	3	2	–	1	×									M63	Southeast
Northwest	1971	M62	13	6 12	5	4	3	2	–	1	×									M63	Southeast
Northwest	1974	M62	13	1 12	2	3	4	5	–	7	8	9	10		11	×				M63	Southeast
Northwest	1982	M62	13	1 12	2	3	4	5	–	7	8	9	10		11	12	13	×		M63	Southeast
Northwest	1989	M62	13	1 12	2	3	4	–	6	7	8	9	10		11	12	13	14	15	M63	Southeast
◀ Clockwise	1998	M60	13	12	11	10	9	–	8	7	6	5	4	3	2	1	27	26	25	M60	Anticlockwise ▶
Timeline of M63 junction numbers

Key
×	Motorway not open
–	Motorway open but no junction

== Signage legacy ==
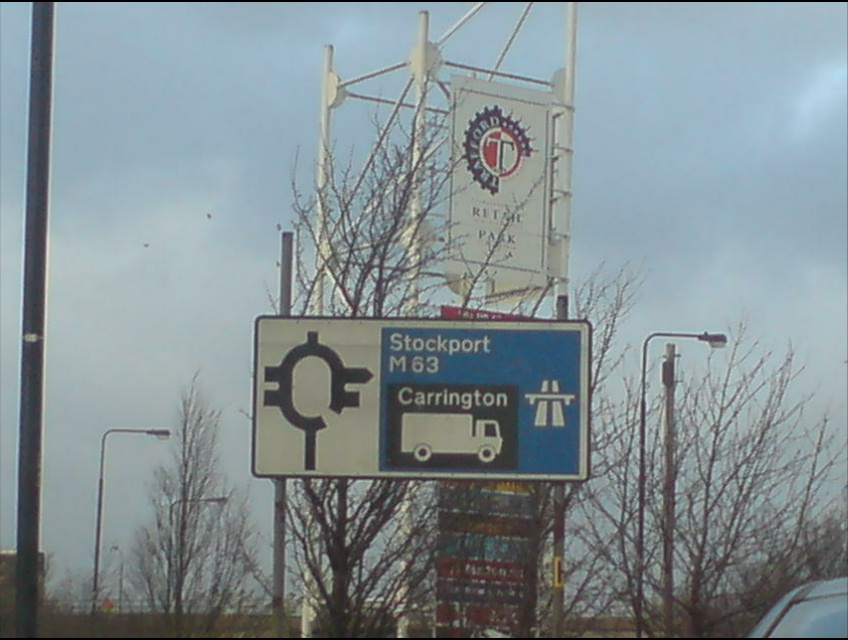
A sign still showing M63 in Trafford in July 2007, despite the road being re-numbered in 1998

Despite the M63 being renumbered in 1998 to M60, many roadsigns still existed pointing travellers to the M63 until late 2005. One existed on the roundabout Redclyffe Circle near the Trafford Centre stating "Stockport M63, Carrington", but this was replaced with an M60 sign in the period 2012–2014. There were also two signs on Manchester Road, Wilmslow, one of which was still in place in October 2021. Another sign could be found on Trafford Road, Salford Quays across the road from Exchange Quay. However, one sign has been recently removed. Located at the roundabout joining Alderley Road in Wilmslow, the sign was still in place in June 2016, but it has since been removed.
