= Denton Island =

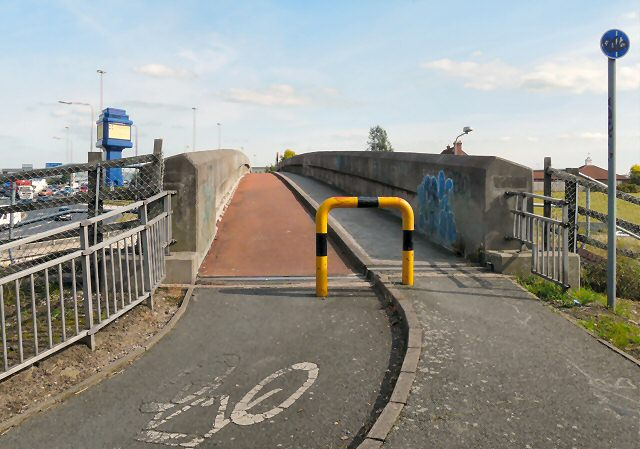
- Footbridge over the M60 at Denton Island.
- Interactive map of Denton Island

Location
- Denton, Greater Manchester
- Coordinates: 53.456891°N 2.136275°W
- Roads at junction: M60; M67; A57

Construction
- Type: Roundabout interchange
- Opened: 1989
- Maintained by: National Highways

Location in Greater Manchester
Location in UK motorway network

Denton Island is a major road junction near Denton in Greater Manchester.

It is a grade-separated roundabout which is both Junction 24 of the M60 motorway and the western terminus (Junction 1) of the M67 motorway. The A57 road also runs west from the junction into Manchester city centre, and east as slip roads to/from the M67 arm into Denton and towards Hyde.

Denton railway station is located underneath the M67 arm of the junction.
