= M60 motorway (Great Britain) =

Motorway in Greater Manchester, England

M60
- Manchester Outer Ring Road
- M60 highlighted in blue
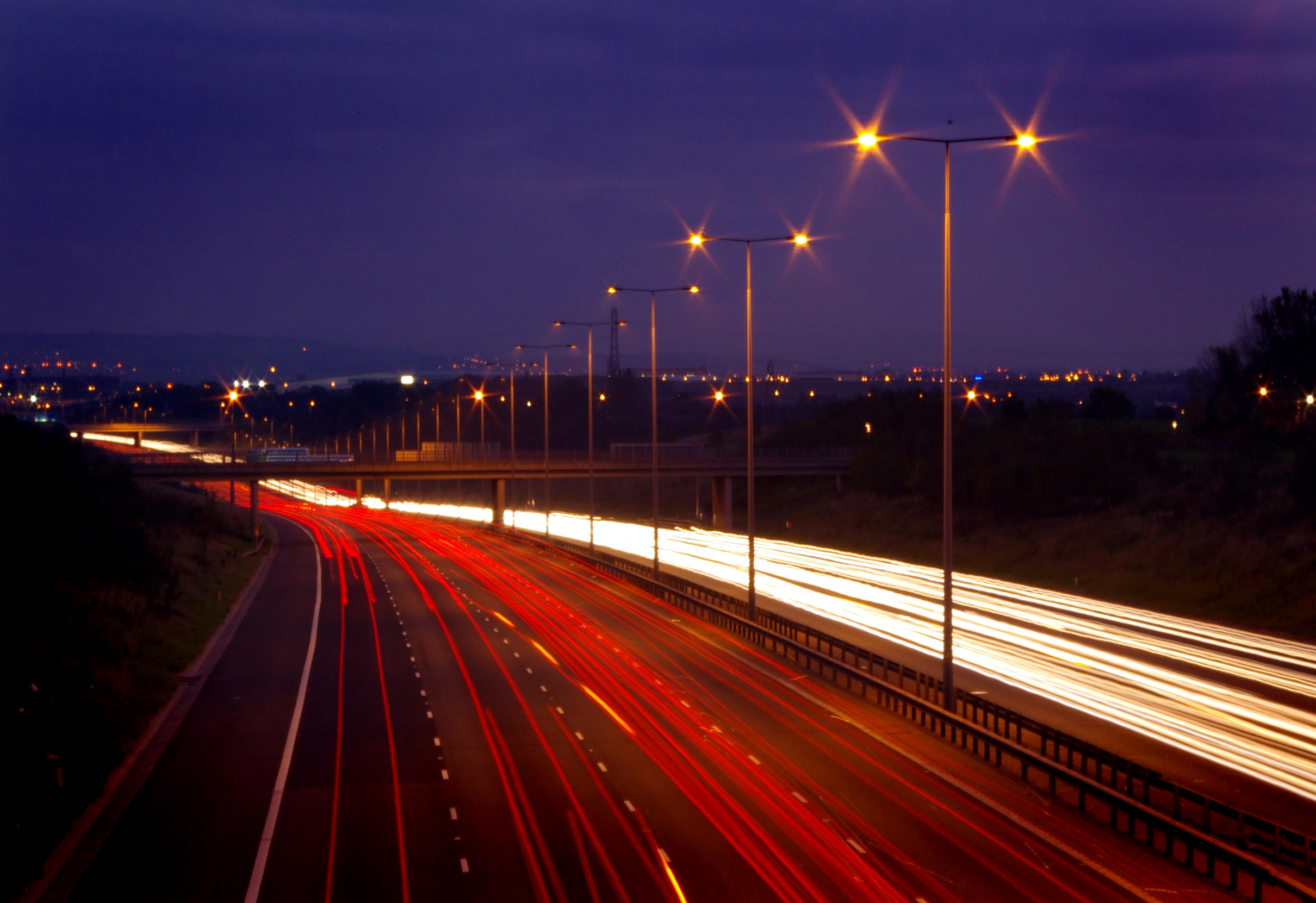
- Looking south at Cutler Hill near Failsworth, 2007

Route information
- Part of E20 and E22
- Maintained by National Highways
- Length: 36.1 mi (58.1 km) 7 miles (11 km) are concurrent with the M62 motorway
- Existed: 1998–present
- History: Opened: 1960 (as M62), 1971 (Middleton Link), 1974 (as M63); Renumbered: 1998; Completed: 2000

Major junctions
- Orbital around Manchester
- Anti-clockwise end: Stockport
- J4 → M56 motorway; / J12 → M62 motorway/M602 motorway; J15 → M61 motorway; / J18 → M62 motorway/M66 motorway; J24 → M67 motorway
- Clockwise end: Bredbury & Stockport

Location
- Country: United Kingdom
- Counties: Greater Manchester
- Primary destinations: Manchester, Stockport, Trafford Park, Ashton-under-Lyne, Oldham

Road network
- Roads in the United Kingdom; Motorways; A and B road zones
← M58	→ M61

The M60 motorway, Manchester Ring Motorway or Manchester Outer Ring Road is an orbital motorway in North West England. Built over a 40-year period, it passes through all of Greater Manchester's metropolitan boroughs except for Wigan and Bolton. Most of Manchester is encompassed within the motorway, except for the southernmost part of the city (Wythenshawe and Manchester Airport) which is served by the M56.

The M60 is 36.1 miles (58.1 km) long and was renamed the M60 in 1998, with parts of the M62, M66 and all of the M63 being amalgamated into the new route, and the circle completed in 2000. The road forms part of the unsigned Euroroutes E20 and E22 from junctions 12 to 18.

In 2008, the M60 was proposed as a cordon for congestion charging in Greater Manchester, although this was rejected in a referendum relating to the Greater Manchester Transport Innovation Fund.

== History ==
The M60 was developed by connecting and consolidating the existing motorway sections of the M63, M62, and an extended M66. It came into existence as the M60 in 1998, followed by the completion of the eastern side (junctions 19–23) opening in October 2000.

The original plan called for a completely new motorway, but policy change led to the plan which created the current motorway. As soon as it opened, the motorway came close to its projected maximum volume on significant sections.

It is an orbital motorway, and in 2004, a section of the northern M60 was the UK's busiest stretch of road, with an average of 181,000 vehicles per day using the stretch between junctions 16 and 17. Usually, the western side of the M25 motorway holds that distinction, but the M25's figures at the time were lower than normal due to roadworks starting.

In 2006, the section between junctions 5 and 6 was widened from three to four lanes each way and the section between junctions 6 and 8 was widened from two to three lanes each way with an additional two-lane collector/distributor road on either side of the main carriageways. Access for junctions 6 to 8 is only from the collector/distributor road. Some of the junctions were extensively re-modelled. As part of the project, the A6144(M) motorway, which connected to the M60 at junction 8, was downgraded and lost its motorway status.

The Greater Manchester congestion charge which would have affected drivers only during peak times coming off the M60 towards Manchester was rejected by a referendum on 12 December 2008.

Work to upgrade two sections of the M60 to a managed motorway system had been planned to commence in 2013. This would have included a new lane from junction 12 to 15 and a new lane from junction 8 to 12 near the Trafford Centre. Both these projects were subsequently cancelled in favour of a new project that includes speed cameras on this section but no additional lane or hard-shoulder running. An 'environmental assessment' was cited as the reason an additional lane was not provided. A combined approach was initiated in 2014, comprising managed motorway system and lane gain scheme. Work commenced in July 2014, and the full stretch of smart motorway became fully operational on 31 July 2018.

There are no motorway service areas on the M60. The closest service area is at Birch Services on the M62 heading eastwards.

== M60 genealogy ==
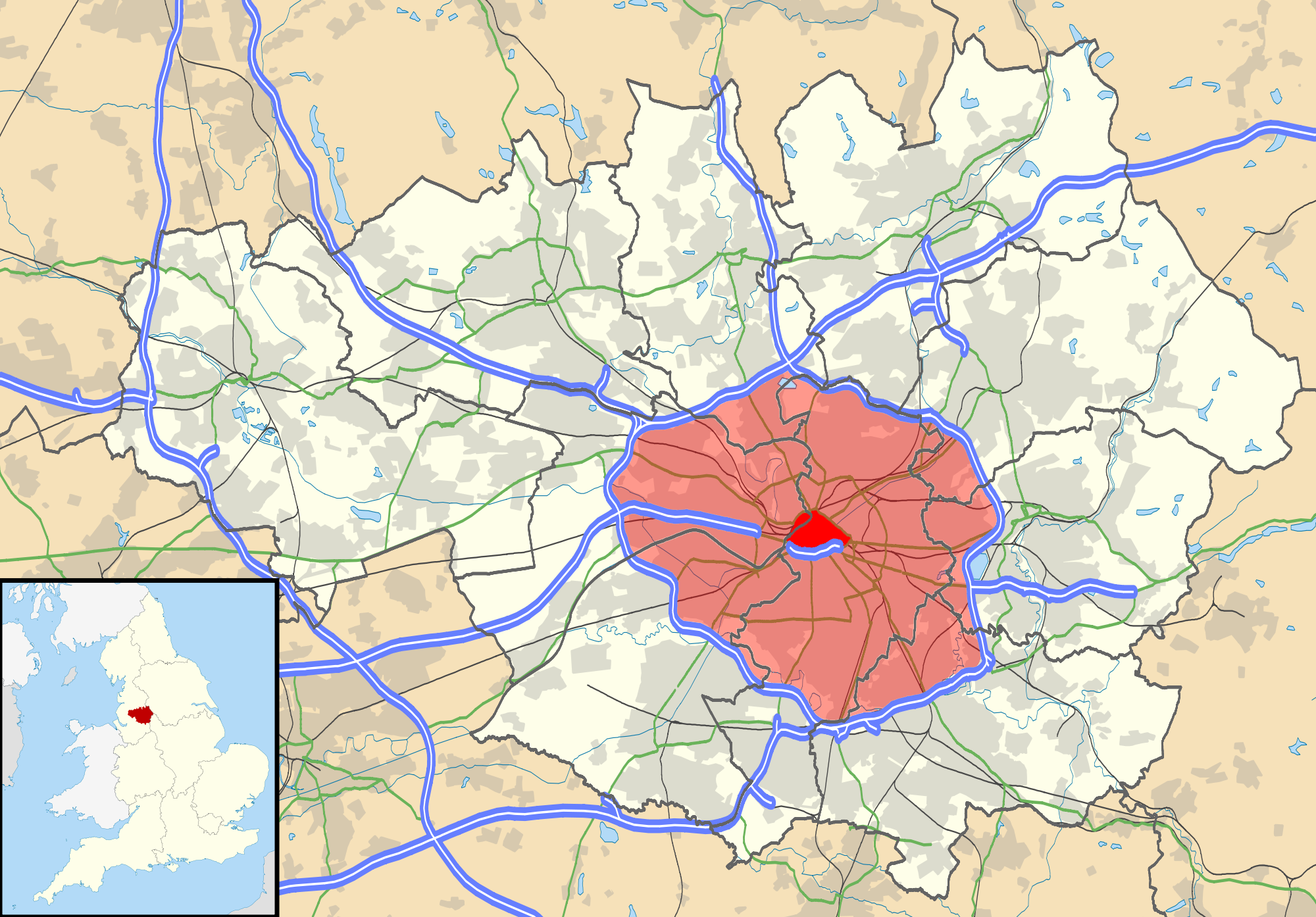
The M60 orbits the urban core of Greater Manchester, highlighted in red on the map

Timeline of M60 junction numbers
▲ Clockwise
1960	1968	1971	1974/5	1982	1989	1998	2000	Roads
×		×					22	A62
×		×					21	(A663)
×		×					20	A664
×		○	5			19		A576
×		M68	M66			M60		
×		○ 18	4 18	4 18	4 18	18		M62 M66
×		M62				M60		
×		17				17		A56
×		15				16		A666
×		14				15		M61
×		14A				14		A580
6		13				13		A575
M62						M60		
–		12 6	12 1	12 1	12 1	12		M62 M602
M62	M63					M60		
5	5		2			11		A57
4	4		3			10		B5214
3	3		4			9		A5081
2	2		5		–	–		B5213
–	–		–		6	8		A6144
1	1		7			7		A56
M62	M63					M60		
×			8			6		A6144
×			9			5		A5103 (M56)
×			10			4		M56
×			10			3		A34
×			11			2		A560
×			×	12		1		A5145
×			×	13		27		A560
×			×	×	14	26		A560
×			×	×	M63	M60		
×			×	×	15 12	25		A560
×			×	×	M66	M60		
×			×	×	11	24		A57 (M67)
×			×	×	10	23		A635
×			×	×	×		22	A62
×			×	×	×		21	(A663)
×			×	×	×		20	A664
1960	1968	1971	1974/5	1982	1989	1998	2000	Roads
▼ Anti-clockwise

Key
×	Motorway not open
–	Motorway open but no junction
○	Unnumbered junction

== Legislation ==
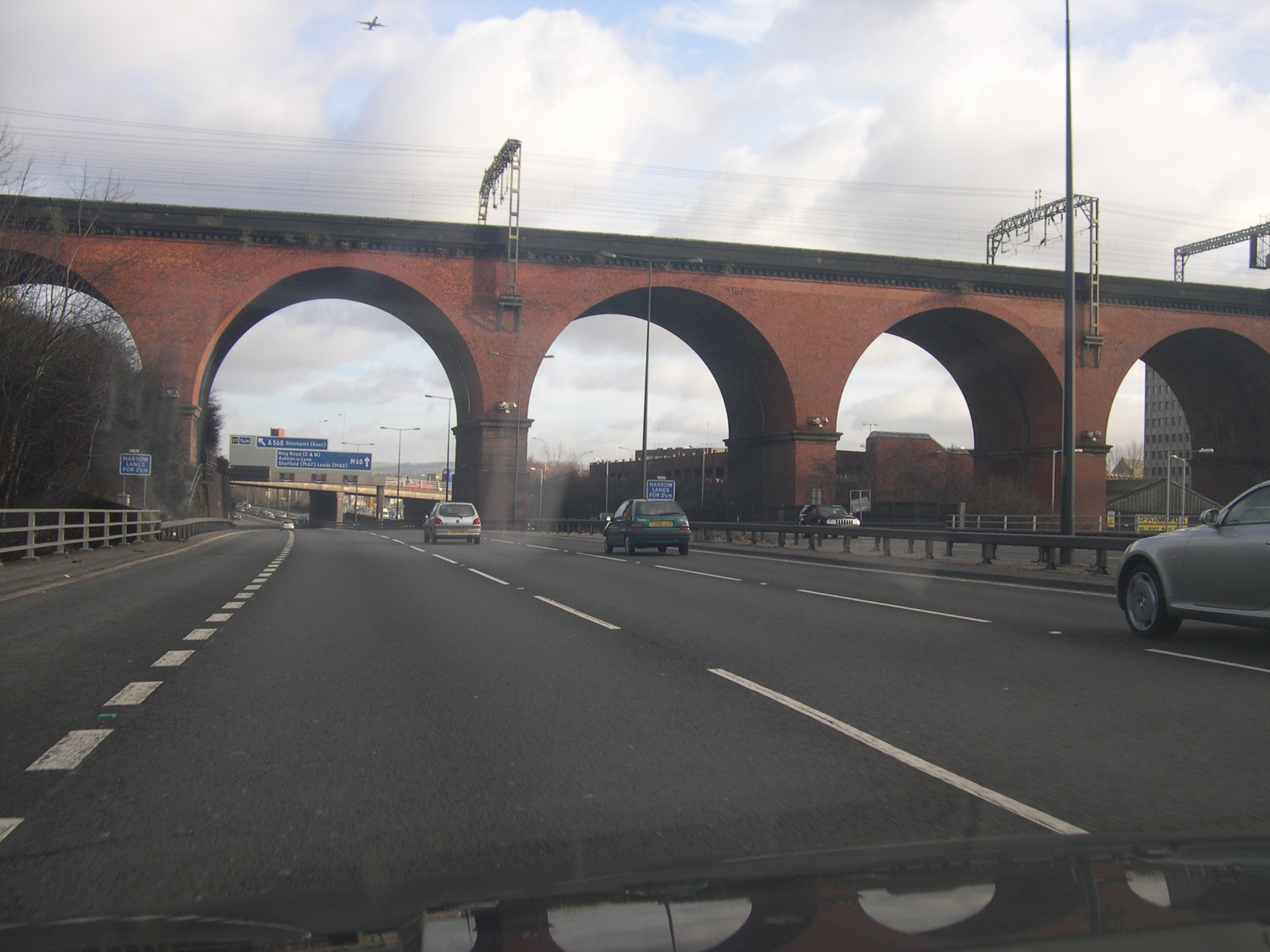
The M60 motorway as it passes beneath Stockport Viaduct

Each motorway in England requires that a statutory instrument be published, detailing the route of the road, before it can be built. The dates given on these statutory instruments relate to when the document was published, and not when the road was built. Provided below is an incomplete list of statutory instruments relating to the route of the M60.

- "Statutory Instrument 1988 No. 1708: M66 Motorway (Manchester Ring Road, Denton to Middleton Section) and Connecting Roads Scheme 1988". opsi.gov.uk.
- "Statutory Instrument 1988 No. 1728: M66 Motorway (Middleton to the Lancashire/Yorkshire Motorway (M62) Section) and Connecting Roads Scheme 1988". opsi.gov.uk.
- Statutory Instrument 1993 No. 363: "M66 Motorway (Manchester Outer Ring Road, Denton to Middleton Section) A663 Broadway All-Purpose Connecting Road Order 1993". opsi.gov.uk.
- "Statutory Instrument 1993 No. 364: M66 Motorway (Manchester Outer Ring Road, Denton to Middleton Section) and Connecting Roads Scheme 1988 Amendment Scheme 1993". opsi.gov.uk.
- Statutory Instrument 1999 No. 2724: The M60 Motorway (Improvement Between Junctions 5 and 8) Connecting Roads Scheme 1999 S.I. 1999/2724
- "Statutory Instrument 2002 No. 2403: The M60 Motorway (Junction 25) (Speed Limit) Regulations 2002". opsi.gov.uk.

== Junctions ==
The junctions on the M60 are very closely spaced together, with an average distance of 1.3 miles (2.1 km) between junctions. The recommended junction spacing for motorways is every 10 to 12 miles (16 to 19 km). By comparison, the M6 motorway has an average distance of 5.3 miles (8.5 km) between junctions.

The entire length of the M60 lies within the ceremonial county of Greater Manchester.

M60 motorway junctions
Location	mi	km	Junction	Destinations	Notes
Stockport	0	0	1 (Note: 53.4091°N 2.1742°W)	A5145 - Stockport	
Cheadle	1.5	2.4	2 (Note: 53.4017°N 2.2100°W)	A560 - Cheadle	No Eastbound entrance or Westbound exit
Cheadle			3 (Note: 53.3989°N 2.2262°W)	A34 - Cheadle, Wilmslow	No exits going Northbound or entrances from North
Gatley			4 (Note: 53.3991°N 2.2377°W)	M56 - Chester, Warrington, Manchester Airport	No exit Eastbound or entrance Westbound
Wythenshawe	4.5	7.3	5 (Note: 53.4139°N 2.2649°W)	A5103 - Central Manchester, Didsbury, Chester, Warrington, Manchester Airport	No exits North or entrances from South going East No exits South or entrances from North going West
Sale	6.0	9.7	6 (Note: 53.4267°N 2.2939°W)	A6144 - Sale	
Sale	6.8	10.9	7 (Note: 53.4370°N 2.3151°W)	A56 - Central Manchester, Stretford, Altrincham	
Sale	7.5	12.0	8 (Note: 53.4409°N 2.3356°W)	A6144 - Carrington	
Urmston	9.3	15.0	9 (Note: 53.4579°N 2.3392°W)	A6144 - Trafford Park, Trafford Centre; B5158 - Urmston	
Urmston	10.3	16.5	10 (Note: 53.4643°N 2.3570°W)	B5158 - Trafford Park, Urmston	
Eccles	11.4	18.4	11 (Note: 53.4763°N 2.3736°W)	A57 - Eccles, Irlam	
Eccles	12.2	19.7	12 (Note: 53.4876°N 2.3768°W)	M62 - Liverpool, Warrington M602 - Central Manchester, Salford	
Worsley	13.0	21.0	13 (Note: 53.5012°N 2.3838°W)	A572 - Swinton A575 - Worsley, Leigh A580	
Worsley	14.1	22.7	14 (Note: 53.5130°N 2.3697°W)	A580 - St. Helens, Leigh	Northbound entrance from East and Southbound exit going West only
Worsley			15 (Note: 53.5235°N 2.3604°W)	M61 - Preston, Wigan, Bolton	
Clifton	16.3	26.2	16 (Note: 53.5262°N 2.3371°W)	A666 - Salford, Kearsley	No entrance Eastbound or exit Westbound
Whitefield	18.5	29.7	17 (Note: 53.5388°N 2.2889°W)	A56 - Central Manchester, Prestwich, Whitefield	
Whitefield	19.8	31.8	18 (Note: 53.5498°N 2.2605°W)	(Simister Island) M62 - Leeds, Huddersfield M66 - Bury, Burnley, Blackburn	
Middleton	21.0	33.8	19 (Note: 53.5400°N 2.2372°W)	A576 - Central Manchester, Middleton	
Middleton	22.6	36.4	20 (Note: 53.5338°N 2.2069°W)	A664 - Middleton, Blackley	No Westbound exit or Eastbound entrance
Whitegate	24.7	39.8	21 (Note: 53.5269°N 2.1601°W)	A663 - Central Manchester, Rochdale, Chadderton	
Failsworth	26.3	42.3	22 (Note: 53.5200°N 2.1434°W)	A62 - Central Manchester, Oldham	No entrance North-Eastbound
Ashton under Lyne	28.6	46.0	23 (Note: 53.4799°N 2.1173°W)	A635 - Ashton under Lyne A6140 - Ashton under Lyne	
Denton	30.6	49.3	24 (Note: 53.4568°N 2.1361°W)	M67 - Hyde, Sheffield; A57 - Central Manchester, Denton	
Stockport			25 (Note: 53.4251°N 2.1258°W)	A560 - Bredbury	no entrances to M60 South-Westbound
Stockport			26 (Note: 53.4204°N 2.1376°W)	A560 - Stockport	No entrances or exits going East No exits to A560 going east or exits from A560 going west
Stockport			27 (Note: 53.4166°N 2.1488°W)	A560 - Stockport	No South-Westbound exit or North-Eastbound entrance
Stockport	36.1	58.1	Motorway continues to junction 1		
1.000 mi = 1.609 km; 1.000 km = 0.621 mi: Incomplete access

Coordinate list

M60 motorway junctions
mile	km	Anti-clockwise exits (B Carriageway)	Junction	Clockwise exits (A Carriageway)
0.0	0.0	Stockport (West & Centre) A5145	J1	Stockport (West) A5145
1.5	2.4	Cheadle A560	J2	No access (on-slip only)
		Cheadle, Wilmslow A34	J3	Cheadle, Wilmslow A34
		No access (on-slip only)	J4	Chester, Warrington, Manchester, Birmingham (M6) M56
4.5	7.3	Chester, Manchester, Birmingham (M6) A5103 (M56)	J5	Manchester (C), Didsbury A5103
6.0	9.7	Sale A6144	J6	Sale A6144
6.8	10.9	Manchester (C), Stretford, Altrincham A56	J7	Altrincham, Manchester (C), Stretford A56
7.5	12.0	End of variable speed limit	J8	Carrington A6144
7.5	12.0	Carrington A6144	J8	Start of variable speed limit
9.3	15.0	Trafford Park, Trafford Centre A5081	J9	Urmston B5158, Trafford Park A5081
10.3	16.5	Trafford Park, Urmston B5214	J10	Trafford Park B5214
11.4	18.4	Eccles, Irlam A57	J11	Irlam, Eccles A57
12.2	19.7	Manchester (C), Salford M602 (M6), Liverpool M62	J12	Liverpool, Warrington M62; Manchester (C), Salford M602
13.0	21.0	Swinton A572, Worsley A575	J13	Worsley, Leigh A575, Swinton A572
14.1	22.7	St. Helens, Leigh A580	J14	No access (on-slip only)
		(M6 North), Preston, Wigan, Bolton M61	J15	Preston, Wigan, Bolton M61
16.3	26.2	Salford, Kearsley A666	J16	No access (on-slip only)
18.5	29.7	Manchester City Centre, Prestwich, Whitefield A56	J17	Whitefield, Prestwich A56
19.8	31.8	Start of variable speed limit	J18 TOTSO	Burnley, Bury M66; Leeds, Huddersfield M62
19.8	31.8	Leeds M62; Bury, Burnley, Blackburn M66	J18 TOTSO	End of variable speed limit
21.0	33.8	Middleton A576	J19	Manchester City Centre, Middleton A576
22.6	36.4	No access (on-slip only)	J20	Middleton, Blackley A664
24.7	39.8	Rochdale, (A627(M)), Chadderton (A663)	J21	Manchester City Centre, Chadderton (A663)
26.3	42.3	Manchester City Centre, Oldham A62	J22	Oldham A62
28.6	46.0	Ashton-under-Lyne A6140	J23	Ashton-under-Lyne A635
30.6	49.3	Manchester City Centre, Denton A57, Hyde, Sheffield (M67)	J24	Denton A57, Hyde, Sheffield (M67); Manchester City Centre A57
		Bredbury A560	J25	Bredbury A560
		No access	J26	Stockport (E&C) A560
		Stockport (East) A560	J27	No access (on-slip only)
36.1	58.1	Motorway continues to J1		
1.000 mi = 1.609 km; 1.000 km = 0.621 mi: Incomplete access

Data from driver location signs is used to provide distance and carriageway identifier information.

== Incidents ==
- On 27 May 2021 a car being chased by Greater Manchester Police deliberately drove the wrong direction on the motorway, colliding head-on with another car. Both drivers died. The accident triggered an investigation by the Independent Office of Police Conduct.

== See also ==
- List of motorways in the United Kingdom
