= M63 =

M63 or M-63 may refer to:

- M63 mine, a French anti-personnel mine
- M63 motorway, a former designation for a road in Greater Manchester
- M-63 Plamen a multiple rocket launcher
- M-63 (Michigan highway), a state highway in Michigan
- Messier 63, a spiral galaxy in the constellation Canes Venatici
- Stoner M63, an assault rifle/light machine gun
- A model of Mercedes AMG
- A developed version of the M62 (later designated as Shvetsov ASh-62) aero-engine
