= Mancunian Way =

Elevated motorway in England

A57(M)
- Mancunian Way
- A57(M) highlighted in blue
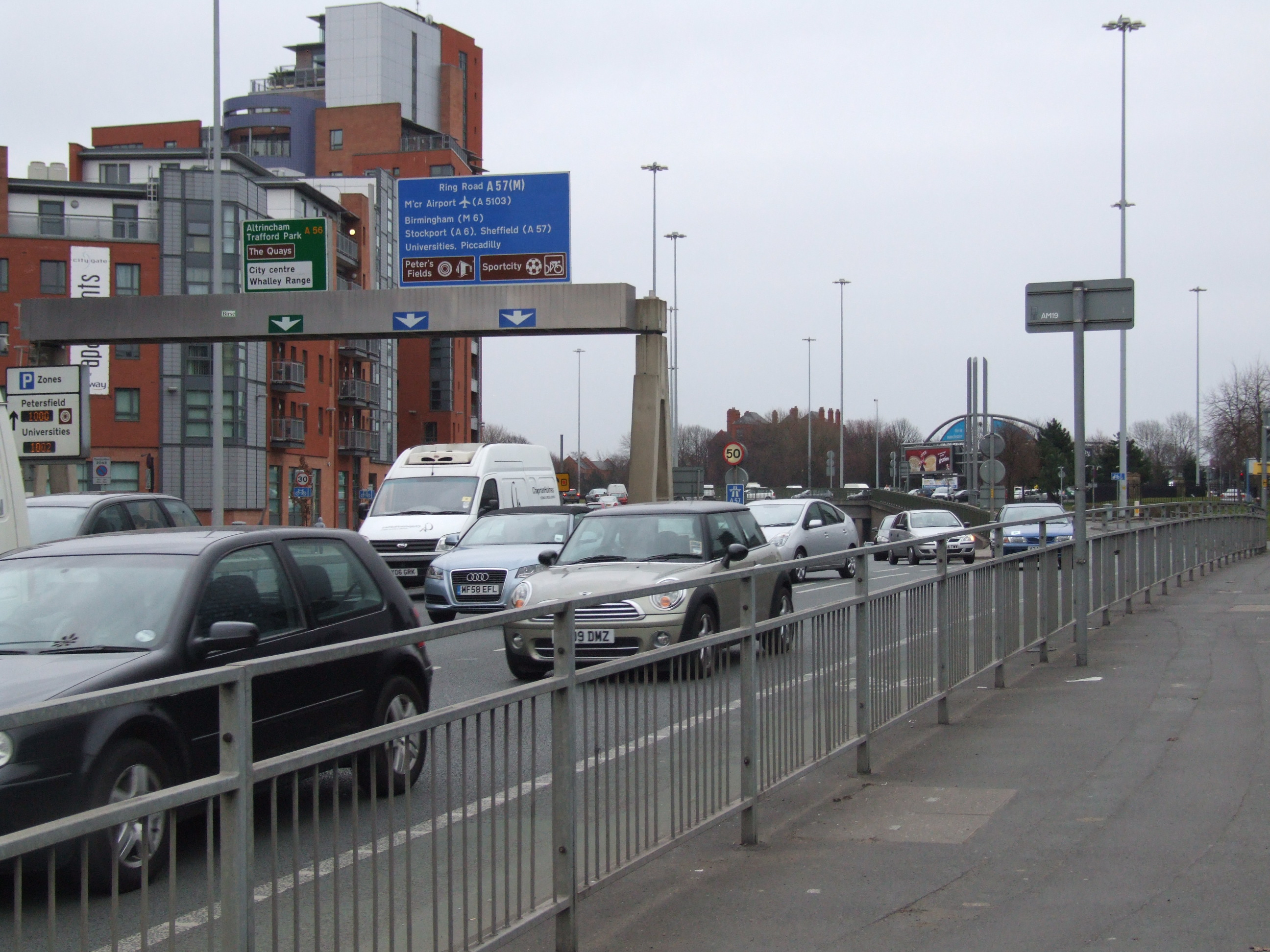
- Looking towards the eastbound start of the motorway

Route information
- Maintained by Manchester City Council
- Length: 2.0 mi (3.2 km)
- Existed: 1967–present
- History: Additional slip roads completed in 1992

Major junctions
- southeast end: Downing Street/London Road (A6)
- northwest end: Chester Road (A56)

Location
- Country: United Kingdom
- Primary destinations: Manchester

Road network
- Roads in the United Kingdom; Motorways; A and B road zones

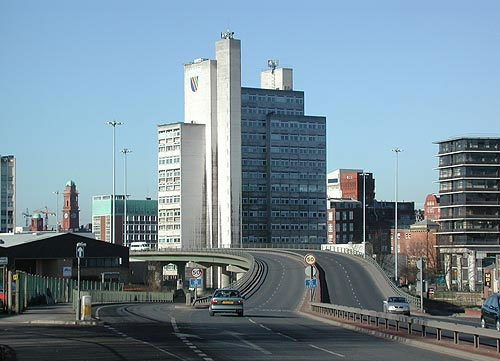
A view of the Mancunian Way elevated motorway near the University of Manchester.

The Mancunian Way is a two mile long grade separated elevated motorway in Manchester, England. It is officially made up of the A57(M) and A635(M) motorways, although the latter does not appear on road signs for practical reasons. It is also part of two other roads: the A57 to the west, which runs east–west through Greater Manchester linking the M602 and M67 motorways, and a short section of non-motorway A635 to the east. Part of this non-motorway section collapsed on 14 August 2015 due to a sinkhole.

== Route ==
The road forms a major part of the Manchester–Salford Inner Ring Road and runs south of the city centre. Running eastbound, it starts as a two-lane dual carriageway and passes underneath the A56. Following this, the road widens to three lanes. At the next junction which leads to the A5103, the road reduces to two lanes and becomes an elevated highway. This section runs atop link roads and two roundabouts before reaching the next junction with the A34. At this point the road passes through the centre of the campuses of UMIST (now part of the University of Manchester) and Manchester Metropolitan University. It then runs for around 3/4 mile (1.2 km) before reaching its junction with the A6 which it crosses on a bridge before dropping down to ground level. It then finishes on the A635 and continues eastbound, and also continues to be called the Mancunian Way.

== History ==
=== Design ===
The Mancunian Way was conceived to form part of the South East Lancashire and North East Cheshire (SELNEC) Highway Plan of 1962, although similar proposals were developed from 1959. A parliamentary bill to authorise the construction of the Mancunian Way was proposed and approved in 1961. During its design it was known as Link Road 17/7. The scheme lies over the geological West Manchester Fault.

It would be the first elevated main road to be built outside London, and the UK's second aerial motorway after the Hammersmith flyover. The road is 3,232 ft (985 m) long and has 28 spans of 105 ft (32 m), and two spans of 60 ft (18 m).

The spans are made out of precast concrete, with hollow box-units post-tensioned to form a spine beam. Each of the 105 ft spans is made out of 14 precast concrete hollow box-units 7 ft 3in long. Freyssinet (named after Eugène Freyssinet) multi-strand prestressing cables were threaded through ducts in the box sections. Testing of the design was carried on a 1/12th model at the Research Station of the Cement and Concrete Association at Wexham Springs in South Bucks. The design was made by the consulting engineers G Maunsell & Partners, who had designed the similar Hammersmith flyover in 1961. The company was known for prestressed concrete flyovers. The design received a Concrete Society award.

The designer of the bridges would go on to design the Westway dual carriageway in London, which opened as the A40(M) in July 1970, losing its motorway status in 2000.

=== Construction ===
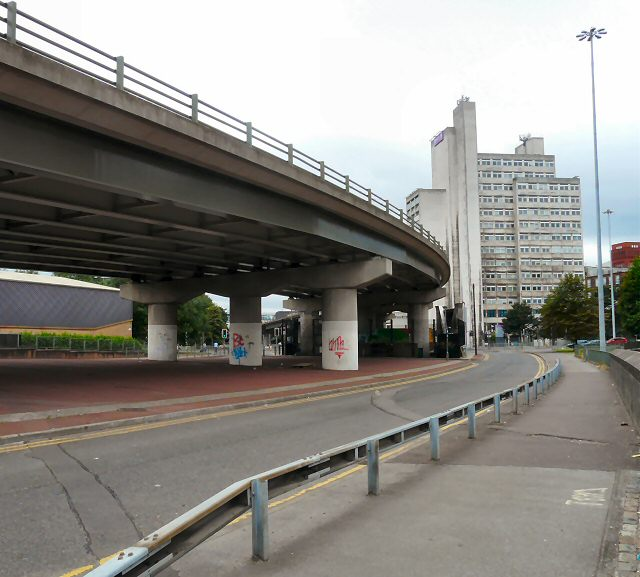
View west at the eastern terminus of the A57(M), from the north of the junction (with the A6 London Road), showing the Maths and Social Sciences Building (former UMIST), and proximate to the Macdonald Manchester Hotel

The construction was carried out in two phases: the first stage involved the construction of a dual carriageway of 2,850 ft (870 m) to the east of the A6 road in November 1963 and was opened to traffic as part of the A635 road in November 1965.

The second stage was the construction, from December 1964, of a 0.6 mi (0.97 km) long elevated highway of a motorway standard which ran between the A6 and A56 roads. The second stage was open to traffic as part of the A57 road in March 1967. The previous day it was opened to pedestrians, who were allowed to walk the whole of the high-level route as a sight-seeing publicity exercise. Many people brought picnics which they ate in the centre of the carriageway.

At that time, the construction specifications had included cosmetic fairings to the tops of the support piers. These completely enclosed the roller bearings upon which the elevated roadway sits. However, the first time these bearings were serviced, the fairings were removed and never replaced. This leaves the poorer appearance seen today and also allows the ingress of dirt to the bearings.

Leonard Fairclough & Son were the contractors, and the prestressed concrete sections were made at its operations in Adlington, Lancashire. The contractor's site compound was in Loxford Street. The piling was completed by Pigott Foundations of Ormskirk with auger (screw) boring with reinforcement cages. The piling went 50 ft (15 m) deep through the boulder clay to the Bunter sandstone (Buntsandstein). The road on the structure and kerbing was built by Wilson and Wilkinson of Worsley in Salford.

=== Opening ===
The Mancunian Way was officially opened by Prime Minister, Harold Wilson, on 5 May 1967. In the 1970s, it was upgraded to motorway status as the A57(M) and the speed limit was raised to 50 mph (80 km/h). At the time of its opening the Manchester Evening News referred to it as the "highway in the sky". The scheme cost was £5.5 million (£88 million in today's figures).

=== Extension as the A635(M) ===
In 1992, the westbound junction was rebuilt to replace a temporary flyover, whereby the A56 passed over a roundabout where the A57(M) originally ended. At the same time, a new flyover was built at the eastern end, over the A6, but was legally designated as the A635(M) in 1995.

=== Oddities ===
Just before the junction with the A34 is an unfinished slip road (stub) that ends 20 feet in the air, although development next to Mancunian Way has meant much of the stub was demolished in October 2018.

The last 1/2 mile (0.80 km) of the Mancunian Way in the east is part of the A635, the A57 heading south east from the same junction as the A6, though it states A57(M) on the signage as one enters westbound. Department for Transport documentation states differently, so officially the Mancunian Way consists of two motorways, the A57(M) and the A635(M).

Part of the easternmost non-motorway section of Mancunian Way collapsed into a 40 ft (12 m) sinkhole on 14 August 2015, after almost half a month's worth of rain fell in parts of Manchester in just six hours. The closure caused significant congestion on the remaining part of Mancunian Way and other nearby roads. It fully reopened on 15 June 2016 after 10 months of repair work.

== Cultural references ==
- The scene in which Sam Tyler wakes up in 1973 in s1e1 of Life on Mars takes place in a planned construction site for the Mancunian Way, despite that it was already built by then. As he runs out of the site, a billboard is shown with the words "Coming Soon! Manchester's Highway in the Sky".
- In 1985, British composer Arthur Butterworth composed a march for large wind band entitled 'Mancunian Way' (op. 66)'.
- The 2006 Take That album Beautiful World includes a track entitled "Mancunian Way", which is about the city of Manchester and the local vicinity and notable events. The group was formed in Manchester and three of the five original members are from the Greater Manchester area.

== Junctions ==
Note: motorway has no junction numbers

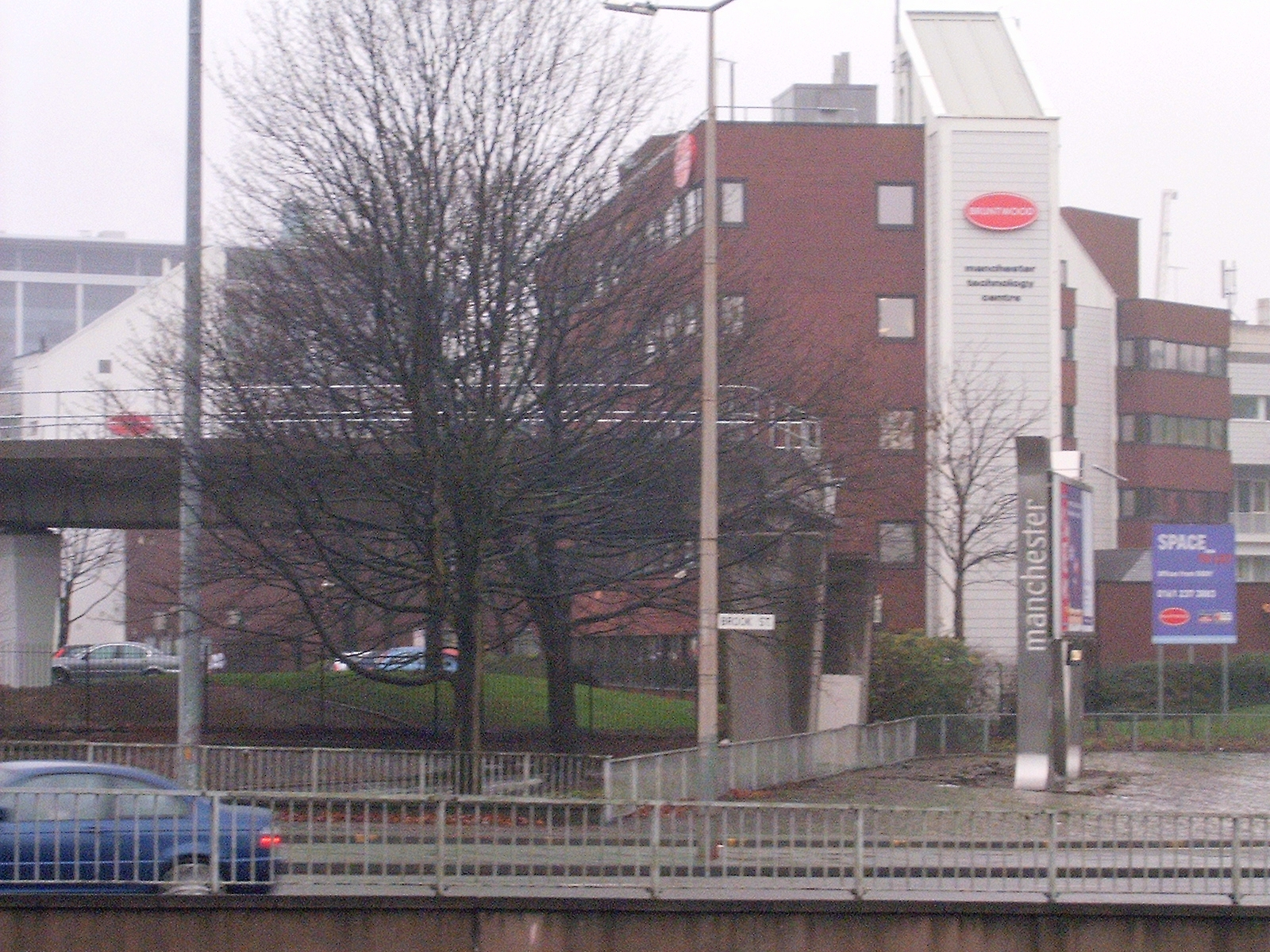
Ramp stub off the Mancunian Way at the junction with the A34

A57(M) and A635(M) motorway junctions
Eastbound exits	Junction	Westbound exits
Road continues as A635 to Ashton-under-Lyne, Mossley and Greenfield		Manchester Piccadilly, Stockport, Hyde A6; Sheffield (A57)
Manchester Piccadilly, Stockport, Hyde A6; Sheffield (A57)		Start of motorway
UMIST, Wilmslow, Cheadle, Cheadle Hulme, A34		No exit
No exit		Didsbury, Birmingham, Moss Side, Hulme, Manchester Airport, Chester, A5103
Didsbury, Birmingham, Moss Side, Hulme, Manchester Airport, Chester A5103		No exit
Start of motorway		Stretford, Sale, Castlefield, Manchester Central Convention Complex A56
Stretford, Sale, Castlefield, Manchester Central A56		Road continues as A57 to Salford and M602

== See also ==
- List of motorways in the United Kingdom
