= M66 motorway =

Motorway in North West England

M66

- M66 highlighted in blue Shown with North West England motorway network

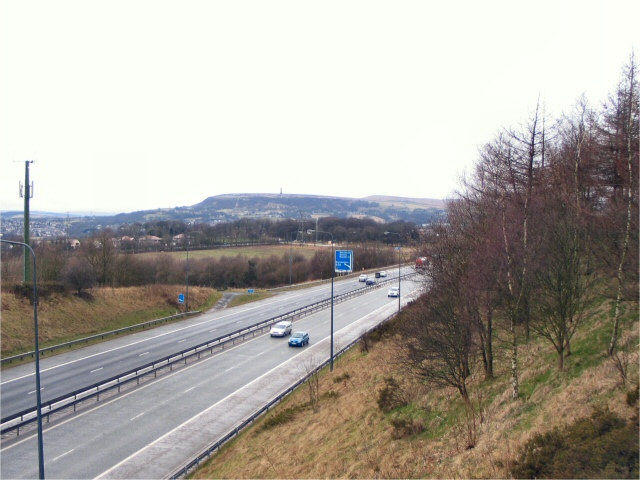
- Looking northwest at junction 1, 2006

Route information
- Maintained by National Highways
- Length: 8.0 mi (12.9 km)
- Existed: 1975–present
- History: Constructed 1975–78

Major junctions
- North end: Edenfield
- J4 → M60 motorway / M62 motorway
- South end: Simister Island

Location
- Country: United Kingdom
- Primary destinations: Manchester, Burnley, Bury

Road network
- Roads in the United Kingdom; Motorways; A and B road zones
← M65	→ M67

The M66, also known as the Bury Easterly Bypass, is a motorway in Lancashire and Greater Manchester, England. It is 8 miles (13 km) long and provides part of the route between the M62 and M60 motorways and the M65, with the rest being provided by the A56.

Historically the motorway used to continue southward around the east side of Manchester, but in 1998 this section was renumbered and became part of the M60 Manchester orbital motorway.

== Route ==
The M66 starts at Simister Island, a junction with the M60 and M62, and heads north as a continuation of the M60 as a three-lane dual carriageway. It passes the eastern edge of Whitefield, through junction 3, goes underneath the East Lancashire Railway and enters the suburbs of Bury. It reduces to two lanes at junction 2 and then climbs onto an elevated section, passing through a post war housing estate. At the end of the elevated road, a third climbing lane is added to the summit of the hill. The road then runs to the east of Ramsbottom and the East Lancashire Railway and ends near Edenfield, where the road continues as the A56 dual carriageway.

== History ==
Map of the motorway in 1998, before the southern part became part of the M60

In 1949 a report, the Road Plan for Lancashire, proposed the construction of Route 9 which would link north east Manchester with Burnley and Blackburn via Route 8. Originally planned to be an all purpose road. the route was redesignated as a motorway prior to construction. The first section (the so-called Middleton Link) was opened in 1971. On the Department for Transport's 2002 Roads List this link is listed as the M68. Construction then began on the southern section of the Bury bypass (junctions 4 to 3) in February 1973 with this opening in August 1975. Immediately after construction began on the northern section (junctions 3 to terminus) with this opening in 1978.

The motorway was planned to run down to Stockport where it would meet the M63 and the proposed A6(M) motorway. The first part of this built was the section from the M67 to the M63 (now junctions 24 to 27 of the M60) with construction beginning in 1986 and it opening to traffic in 1989.

The final section of the motorway was to be between the M67 and the Middleton Link. Construction began on this in 1995. In 1998 it was decided to rename various sections of motorway (parts of the M62 and M66 and the whole of the M63) around Manchester to the M60 to form the "Manchester Outer Ring Road". All sections of the M66 south of the M62 were therefore redesignated as the M60. This final section subsequently opened in 2000.

North of the M66, the road was built as the A56, an all purpose A road which connects with the M65 at junction 8.

Timeline of M66 junction numbers
South
1971	1975	1978	1989	1998	2000	Roads
×			M66	M60		
×			12	25		A560
×			11	24		A57 (M67)
×			10	23		A635
×					22	A62
×					21	(A663)
×					20	A664
M68	M66			M60		
○	5			19		A576
○	4			18 4	18 4	M62
M68	M66					
×	3					(A56)
×		2				A58
×		1				A56
×		M66				
1971	1975	1978	1989	1998	2000	Roads
North

Key
×	Motorway not open
○	Unnumbered junction

== Legislation ==
M66 Motorway (Bury Easterly Bypass Northern Section) and Connecting Roads Scheme 1973
- Statutory Instrument
- Parliament of the United Kingdom
- Citation: SI 1973/1142

M66 Motorway (Bury Easterly Bypass Northern Section) (Junction 2 Southbound Off-Slip) (Detrunking) Order 1996
- Statutory Instrument
- Parliament of the United Kingdom
- Citation: SI 1996/2158

Dates
- Made: 16 August 1996
- Commencement: 13 September 1996

Other legislation
- Made under: Highways Act 1980

Text of the M66 Motorway (Bury Easterly Bypass Northern Section) And Connecting Roads Scheme 1973 (Variation) Scheme 1996 as in force today (including any amendments) within the United Kingdom, from legislation.gov.uk.

M66 Motorway (Bury Easterly Bypass Northern Section) and Connecting Roads Scheme 1973 (Variation) Scheme 1996
- Statutory Instrument
- Parliament of the United Kingdom
- Citation: SI 1996/2159

Dates
- Made: 16 August 1996
- Commencement: 13 September 1996

Other legislation
- Made under: Highways Act 1980

Text of the M66 Motorway (Bury Easterly Bypass Northern Section) And Connecting Roads Scheme 1973 (Variation) Scheme 1996 as in force today (including any amendments) within the United Kingdom, from legislation.gov.uk.

Each motorway in England requires that a statutory instrument be published, detailing the route of the road, before it can be built. The dates given on these statutory instruments relate to when the document was published, and not when the road was built. Provided below is an incomplete list of statutory instruments relating to the route of the M66.

- M66 Motorway (Bury Easterly Bypass Northern Section) and Connecting Roads Scheme 1973 (SI 1973/1142)
- M66 Motorway (Bury Easterly Bypass Northern Section) (Junction 2 Southbound Off-Slip) (Detrunking) Order 1996 (SI 1996/2158)
- M66 Motorway (Bury Easterly Bypass Northern Section) and Connecting Roads Scheme 1973 (Variation) Scheme 1996 (SI 1996/2159)

== Junctions ==
M66 motorway junctions
County	Location	mi	km	Junction	Destinations	Notes
Lancashire	Edenfield	0	0	— (Note: 53.6635°N 2.3100°W)	A56 - Edenfield	Road continues from A56
Greater Manchester	—	2.2	3.6	1 (Note: 53.6329°N 2.3006°W)	A56 - Walmersley, Bury	No Southbound exit or Northbound entrance
Greater Manchester	Bury	5.5	8.8	2 (Note: 53.5913°N 2.2720°W)	A58 - Bury, Heywood, Rochdale	
Greater Manchester	Bury	6.4	10.2	3 (Note: 53.5787°N 2.2714°W)	Unsworth, Heywood	
Greater Manchester	—	8.4	13.6	4 (Note: 53.5498°N 2.2605°W)	M60 - Eccles, Stockport, Ashton under Lyne M62 - Leeds, Hull	
1.000 mi = 1.609 km; 1.000 km = 0.621 mi: Concurrency terminus; Incomplete access

*Ceremonial Counties

Coordinate list

== See also ==
- List of motorways in the United Kingdom
- M60 motorway
