= M67 motorway =

Motorway in Greater Manchester, England

M67

- M67 highlighted in blue Shown with North West England motorway network

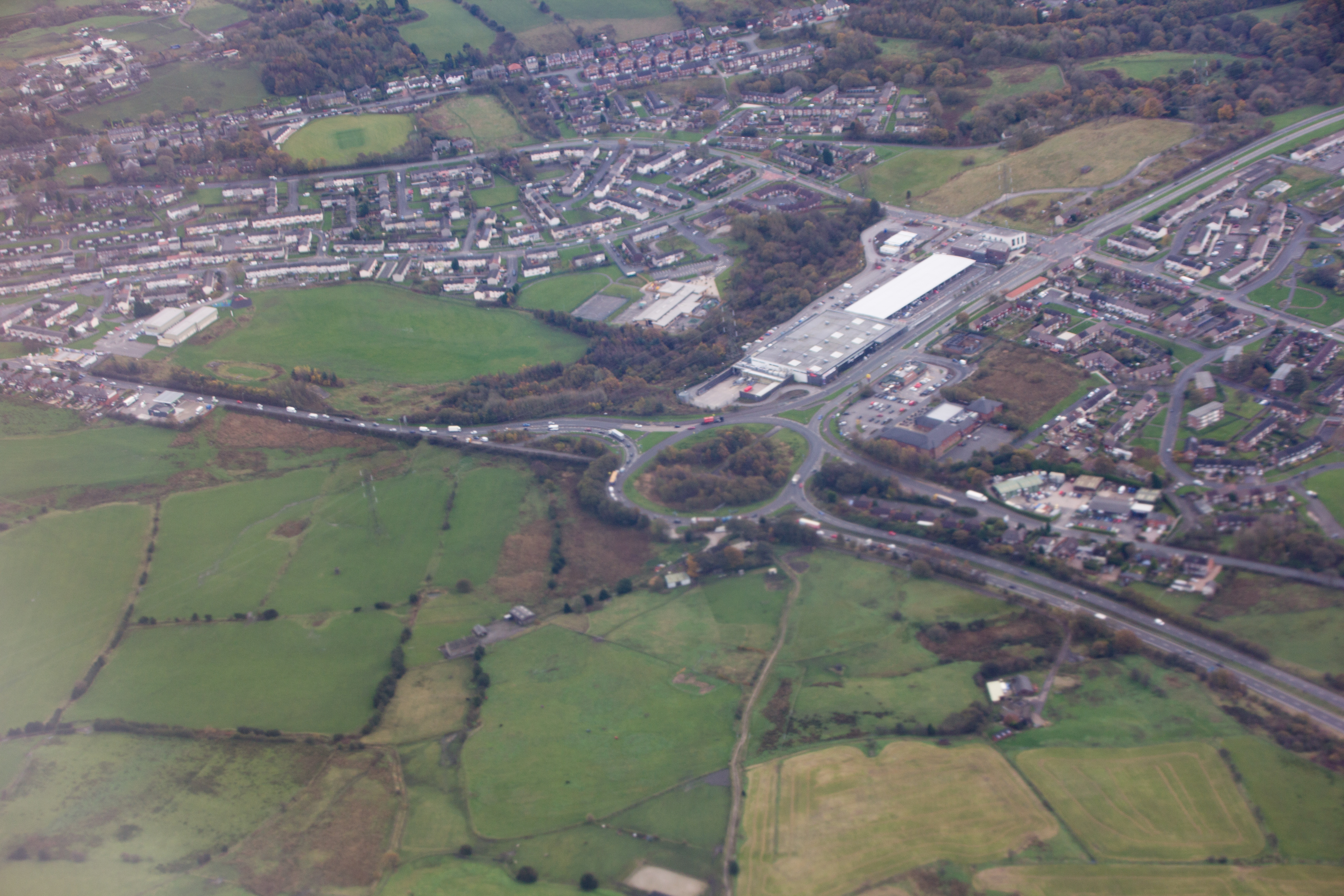
- The east end with the M67 on the right, 2017

Route information
- Maintained by National Highways
- Length: 5.0 mi (8.0 km)
- Existed: 1978–present
- History: Constructed 1978–81

Major junctions
- West end: Denton Island
- J1 → M60 motorway
- East end: Hattersley

Location
- Country: United Kingdom
- Primary destinations: Manchester, Denton, Hyde, Sheffield, Barnsley

Road network
- Roads in the United Kingdom; Motorways; A and B road zones
← M66	→ M69

The M67 is a 5-mile-long (8 km) urban motorway in Greater Manchester, England, which heads east from the M60 motorway passing through Denton and Hyde before ending near Mottram. The road was originally conceived as the first section of a trans-Pennine motorway between Manchester and Sheffield that would connect the A57(M) motorway with the M1 motorway; however, the motorway became the only part to be built.

Numerous calls have been made over the decades to complete the motorway link between Manchester and Sheffield, the second and ninth most populous urban areas within the United Kingdom. Traffic between the cities is mainly divided between the Snake (A57) and Woodhead (A628) passes, which traverse the Peak District. Several plans were suspended and a proposal to link the two cities with a tunnelled scheme underneath the Peak District did not go ahead. In 2024, plans for the Longdendale Bypass, a road that will bypass the heavily congested section of the A57 in Mottram, were approved and cleared for construction.

== Route ==
The M67 heads east from the M60 motorway, passing through Denton and Hyde before ending near Mottram. From the end of the motorway traffic can either follow the A628 road or the A57 road further east to the M1 motorway and Sheffield.

Before the motorway reaches its eastern terminal at Hattersley/Mottram roundabout (where traffic continues along the A57 into Longdendale), there are the stub 'ski ramps' where the motorway would have continued eastwards, as there are at the western end.

== History ==
In 1965, the Ministry of Transport asked Halcrow to report on a route selected by the county surveyor of Cheshire and this led, in stages, to the development of the design to partial urban and partial rural motorway standards. There was a public inquiry in 1967. The first section to be opened was the 'M67 Hyde Bypass' which was constructed between 1975 and 1978. M67 Denton Relief Road to the west was constructed between 1978 and 1981. These schemes are connected by a viaduct over the River Tame and Peak Forest Canal.

=== M67 Manchester to Sheffield motorway ===
In 1967, at the time of the first public inquiry there were discussions regarding an extension of the motorway across the Peak District National Park. It was to provide a second motorway link across the Pennines to the south of the planned M62 and avoid the Snake and Woodhead passes, which are often closed in snowy weather.

The full proposed route was to start from Manchester city centre at what was the A57(M) motorway eastern terminal roundabout (now a flyover for the A635, constructed in 1995), following the line of the A57 Hyde Road through the inner suburbs of Ardwick, Gorton and Debdale Park. Large-scale demolition took place along the line of the motorway (which is still evident today), tied in with the widening of the Belle Vue and Reddish Lane junctions.

From there the intended route follows the present-day M67, skirting Hyde and Denton. Upon reaching Mottram, the route passed the village to the north (through a tunnel), then crossed Mottram Moor to skirt Hollingworth through the Etherow valley floor. The motorway would then have run around the side of Bottoms Reservoir to reach Hadfield, from which the trackbed of the Woodhead railway line (the former intercity route between Manchester and Sheffield, now closed) was to have been followed up the Longdendale valley to Woodhead. At Woodhead, the route would have diverged, with one carriageway entering the Woodhead Rail Tunnel (now disused) and the other rising on a sweeping viaduct to go over a realigned Woodhead Pass.

Beyond the Pennine watershed, the motorway would have continued on a new alignment past the villages of Langsett and Midhopestones, before meeting the route of the current Stocksbridge bypass. The Stocksbridge bypass would have been constructed on its present alignment and continued directly onto the M1 at junction 35a.

Another part of the originally planned "M67" exists in South Yorkshire, as the A616 Stocksbridge bypass, which opened in 1989. As there was no certainty that the whole M67 scheme would be completed by this time, the then government decided that the scheme would not be built with motorway characteristics, but as a single carriageway with crawler lanes.

== Proposed developments ==
=== A57/A628 Mottram in Longdendale, Hollingworth and Tintwistle Bypass ===
Plans for a road at the eastern end of the M67 passing to the north of the current A628 route past Mottram, Hollingworth and Tintwistle were cancelled in 2009 following four adjournments of the public inquiry due to inconsistencies in the official traffic models.

=== Manchester to Sheffield Peak District Tunnel ===
After the cancellation of the Mottram in Longdendale, Hollingworth and Tintwistle Bypass, there are now proposals to build a tunnel underneath the Peak District to link Manchester and Sheffield, with some of the proposed tunnel routes using the existing M67 route to link the M60 and M1 motorways. In 2017, this was later scaled down into a partially tunnelled route along the existing Woodhead Pass due to rising costs.

== Junctions ==
M67 motorway junctions
County	Location	mi	km	Junction	Destinations	Notes
Greater Manchester	Denton	0	0	1 (Note: 53.4569°N 2.1360°W)	M60 – Stockport, Oldham; A57 – Central Manchester	
Greater Manchester	Denton	0.9	1.4	1a (Note: 53.4582°N 2.1150°W)	A6017 – Denton, Ashton under Lyne	No westbound exit or eastbound entrance
Greater Manchester	Denton	1.5	2.4	2 (Note: 53.4562°N 2.1003°W)	A57 – Hyde, Denton	No eastbound exit or westbound entrance
Greater Manchester	Hyde	2.4	3.8	3 (Note: 53.4530°N 2.0785°W)	A57 – Hyde, Denton A627 – Dukinfield	
Greater Manchester	—	4.7	7.6	4 (Note: 53.4547°N 2.0247°W)	A57 – Hyde, Glossop, Sheffield A560 – Stockport	
1.000 mi = 1.609 km; 1.000 km = 0.621 mi: Incomplete access

*Ceremonial Counties

Coordinate list

== See also ==
- List of motorways in the United Kingdom
- Longdendale Bypass
- Woodhead Tunnel
- Woodhead Line
