= A626 road =

Road in England

A626

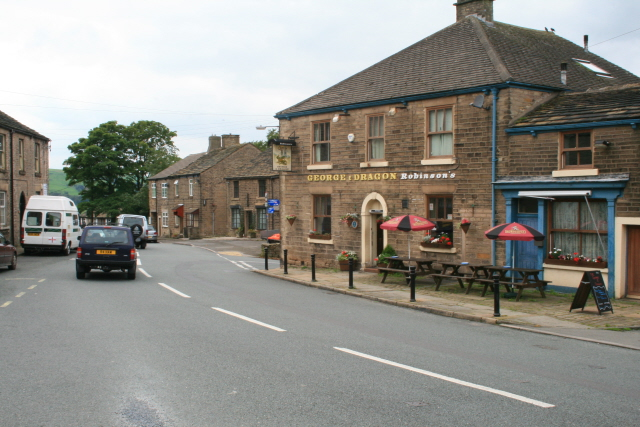
- The A626 in Charlesworth near Glossop

Route information
- Length: 12.2 mi (19.6 km)

Major junctions
- East end: Heaton Chapel
- A6; A57
- West end: Dinting Vale

Location
- Country: United Kingdom

Road network
- Roads in the United Kingdom; Motorways; A and B road zones

The A626 is a main road in England that runs through Stockport to the High Peak.
