= A6144(M) motorway =

Former road in United Kingdom

Coordinates: 53.4348°N 2.3467°W

A6144(M) Carrington Spur Road

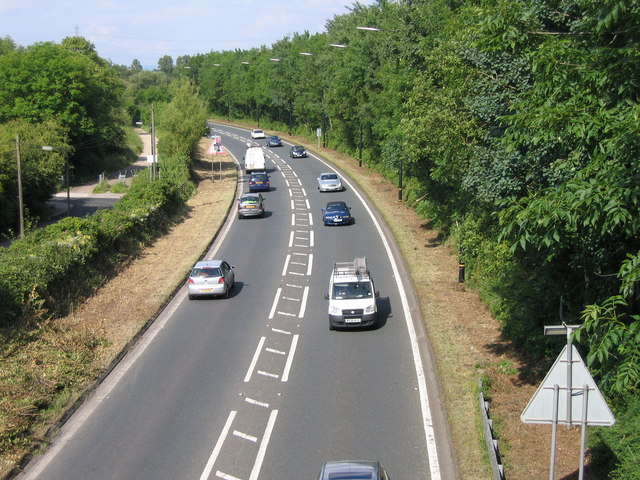
- The road in 2009 after losing motorway status

Route information
- Length: 1.2 mi (1.9 km)
- Status: Downgraded to the A6144
- Existed: 1987–2006

Major junctions
- Northeast end: M60 – Urmston

- Southwest end: A6144 – Carrington

Location
- Country: United Kingdom

Road network
- Roads in the United Kingdom; Motorways; A and B road zones

The A6144(M) was a motorway in Carrington, Greater Manchester, England. It was known in official documentation as the Carrington Spur Road and built to facilitate the transport of hazardous goods from Shell Chemicals' ethylene oxide plant in Carrington and other industrial estates in Carrington and Broadheath. It was extremely unusual in that it was entirely single carriageway, the only motorway of its kind in the UK as others were dual carriageway for at least some of their length.

About 1 mile (2 km) long, the road connected the A6144 road to the M60 at junction 8. It was the highest numbered A-road(M) motorway and one of only three four-digit, Axxxx(M) motorways, the others being the A6127(M) (now A167(M)) and the temporary A1077(M). The motorway was not a trunk road and not the responsibility of the Highways Agency.

The road had no hard shoulder but two emergency lay-bys with SOS phones and lights were provided midway along its length. A reason for its motorway status was that the junction with the M60 had two small roundabouts that were difficult for a driver of a long vehicle prohibited from motorways to perform a U-turn because of their size.

The unusual status of the A6144(M) led to it gaining a number of fans, particularly within organisations such as the Society for All British And Irish Road Enthusiasts (SABRE).

== Revocation of special road status ==
In 2004, work to widen the M60 motorway altered the junction with the A6144(M), which was changed into a single roundabout allowing all motorway-prohibited traffic to turn and not join the M60.

Trafford Borough Council confirmed its intention to remove special road status from the A6144(M) when the M60 widening works were completed.

The A6144(M) ceased to be a special road on 25 May 2006, losing its motorway status. It is now subject to a 50 mph (80 km/h) speed limit and is classified as the A6144. The road through Sale retained the A6144 number, meaning that there are two branches (and two junctions with the M60 motorway) with the same road number. Despite losing motorway status, pedestrians, cyclists, and horse riders are still prohibited on the road.

== Preservation ==
Following the change of signage on 25 May 2006, two marker posts, the A6144(M) confirmation sign and a lay-by warning sign are privately preserved.
