= A56 road =

Road in England

A56

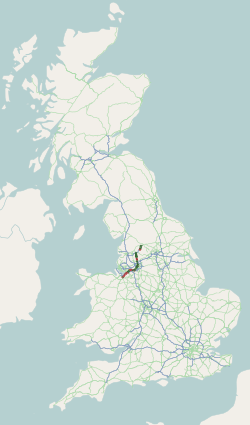

Route information
- Maintained by List: Bury Metropolitan Borough Council Cheshire East Council Cheshire West and Chester Council Halton Borough Council National Highways Lancashire County Council Manchester City Council North Yorkshire Council Salford City Council Trafford Metropolitan Borough Council Warrington Borough Council
- Length: 71.46 mi (115.00 km)

Major junctions
- West end: A5268 Chester

- A41 M53 M56; A50 M60 A57(M); A58 M66 M65
- East end: A59 Broughton

Location
- Country: United Kingdom
- Primary destinations: Runcorn; Warrington; Altrincham; Manchester; Bury; Burnley

Road network
- Roads in the United Kingdom; Motorways; A and B road zones
← A55	→ A57

The A56 is a road in England which extends between the city of Chester in Cheshire and the village of Broughton in North Yorkshire. The road contains a mixture of single and dual carriageway sections, and traverses environments as diverse as the dense urban sprawl of inner city Manchester and the lightly populated region of rural east Lancashire. The road includes a short section of trunk road between the end of the M66 motorway near Ramsbottom and the M65 motorway west of Burnley.

== Route description ==
The road begins as Frodsham Street in the centre of Chester at its junction with Foregate Street A51 and heads north-eastwards out of the city. Just outside the city, the A56 crosses Junction 12 of the M53 motorway, continuing in a north easterly direction. The road passes through the towns and villages of Mickle Trafford, Dunham on the Hill, Helsby and Frodsham whilst roughly paralleling the course of the south side of the M56 motorway. After leaving Frodsham, the A56 crosses the M56 at Junction 11 and passes the towns of Runcorn and Warrington, taking up a more easterly direction to again parallel the course of the north side of the motorway.

The road crosses the M6 motorway halfway between Junctions 20 and 21, before passing south of Lymm on its way to its junction with the A556 road at Bowdon. At Bowdon the A56 turns sharply northwards, passing Altrincham and Sale, crossing the M60 Manchester Outer Ring Road at Junction 7 into Stretford.

The A56 takes the name of Chester Road and continues north-eastwards through Stretford and Hulme into Manchester city centre, where it takes on the name Deansgate, one of Manchester's main shopping streets and thoroughfares. At the end of Deansgate, the A56 takes on the name of Victoria Street as it passes Manchester Victoria railway station. Since 2012, most of Victoria Street has been pedestrianised with planters, but the road markings still remain underneath.

Turning sharply to the north-west, the A56 leaves Manchester and goes through the Broughton district of Salford on its way to Prestwich, where it is called Bury New Road, where it again crosses the M60 Manchester Outer Ring Road at Junction 17. Heading due north the road passes Whitefield and cuts through Bury before crossing the M66 motorway at Junction 1. The road follows the M66 up to its terminus near Edenfield.

The A56 becomes dual carriageway, and traffic from the M66 can continue onto this trunk road section only. Traffic from the A680 and the A676 can also join the A56. Again heading roughly due northwards the A56 bypasses Haslingden and Accrington before joining the M65 motorway at Junction 8, slightly to the west of Burnley.

After joining the M65, the A56 disappears from the maps, only to reappear approximately 6 miles (9.7 km) to the north east close to M65 Junction 13 at a junction with the A682 in central Nelson.

Taking an easterly direction, the A56 goes through Colne before turning sharply to the north. Now cutting through the more rural parts of east Lancashire the road passes Foulridge and Earby, finally reaching its termination point where it merges with the A59 road to the west of Broughton in North Yorkshire. Heading north of Colne, the A56 is signed towards Skipton.

== History ==
Prior to the construction of the M65, M66 and connecting roads, the route continued through Edenfield and into Rawtenstall. The route then passed through the centre of Burnley and on to Nelson, this section is now marked as an extension of the A682.

== See also ==
- M56 motorway
- Chester to Manchester Line
