= A5103 road =

Road in Manchester, England

Coordinates: 53.4352°N 2.2459°W

A5103

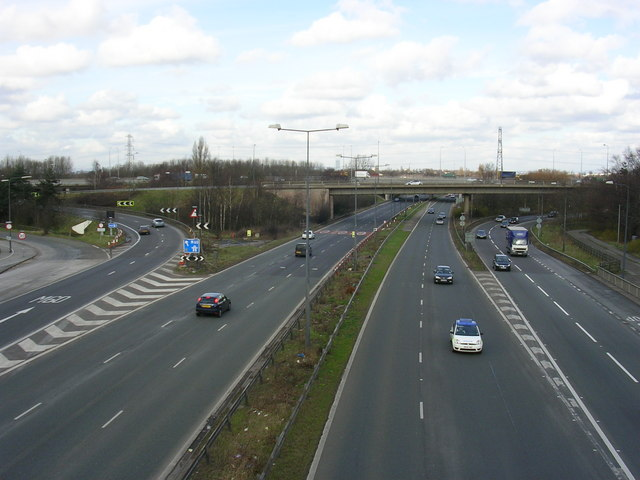

Route information
- Maintained by National Highways; Manchester City Council
- Length: 4.9 mi (7.9 km)

Major junctions
- North end: Manchester city centre and Hulme
- A6; A62; A34 A57(M) A6010 A5145 M60 A560 M56
- South end: M56 motorway Junction 3A and Wythenshawe

Location
- Country: United Kingdom
- Primary destinations: Manchester

Road network
- Roads in the United Kingdom; Motorways; A and B road zones

The A5103 is a major road in England. It runs from Piccadilly Gardens in Manchester city centre to junction 3 of the M56 motorway and is one of Manchester's principal radial routes.

== History ==
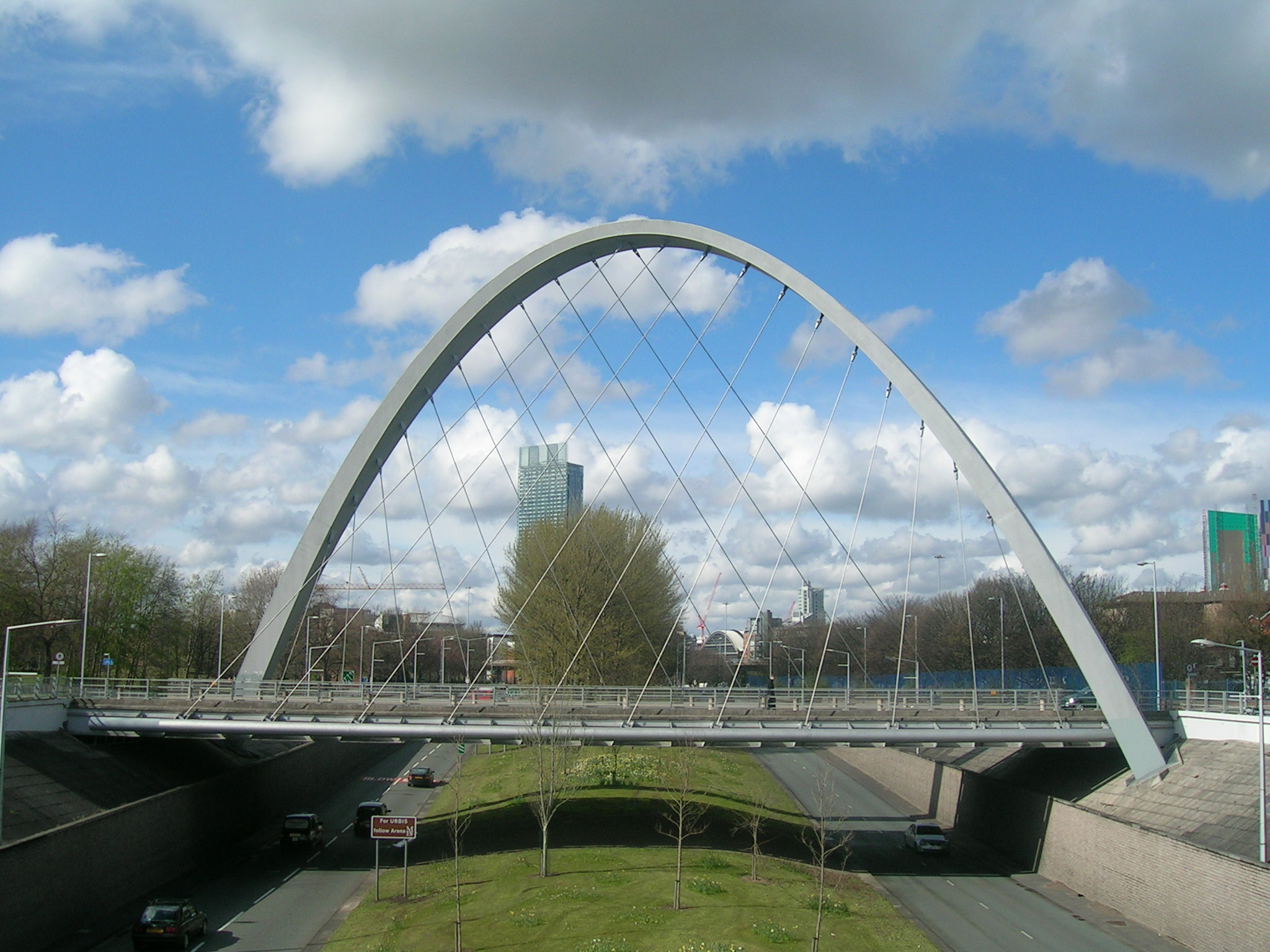
The Hulme Arch Bridge over Princess Road

The original scheme for a new road through the rural area south of Manchester was the design of the urban planner Richard Barry Parker, who envisaged the creation of a parkway – a broad, landscaped highway – to run from the new garden suburb of Wythenshawe, connecting it with Manchester City Centre. Manchester Corporation began construction of the new Princess Parkway in 1929 with a new bridge over the River Mersey. The new road was laid out as a dual carriageway for motor vehicles with a segregated tram track along the central reservation for Manchester Corporation Tramways to run trams into Manchester City Centre.

Princess Road/Princess Parkway was one of two new arterial roads into Manchester built by Manchester Corporation; the other was Kingsway, a few miles to the east, also built as a dual carriageway with reserved tram tracks along the middle. This layout was known as the 'Brodie' system, a new approach to road design that had been pioneered in Liverpool by John Alexander Brodie. The first tracks were laid out in the 1920s, terminating at Southern Cemetery; Manchester Corporation Transport planned to extend the tracks to Northenden and Wythenshawe, but following a change in transport policy in 1930, the Corporation invested in bus services instead. Manchester Corporation Tramways eventually ceased operation in 1949 and the tram tracks were removed.

Parker's scenic Parkway route, running south from Barlow Moor Road to Altrincham Road, was noted for its landscaped verges and rose beds. In its 1945 plan, Manchester Corporation proposed extending the road northwards into the city centre and south through Ollerton and Toft, creating a major traffic route into the city. In 1969, work began to upgrade Princess Parkway to motorway standards, in order to feed into the M56 motorway. To enable this work, Parker's landscaping was removed, with 50,000 trees and shrubs being uprooted, and pedestrian footbridges were installed, and an old country house, Kenworthy Hall, was demolished.

In 1997, the Hulme Arch Bridge designed by Chris Wilkinson Architects and Arup was installed over Princess Road in the Hulme area.

== Route description ==
=== A6 to the Mancunian Way ===
This short section is entirely single-carriageway: it runs in roughly a north–south direction from the junction of the A6 and A62 along Portland Street. It then shares a short section with the A34 (Oxford Street) running west until St Peter's Square. After St Peter's Square, it proceeds south-west along Lower Mosley Street, running past the Manchester Central Convention Complex (formerly Manchester Central station), and the Bridgewater Hall. It then turns south along Albion and Medlock Streets (crossing the Rochdale Canal, the railway viaduct, and the River Medlock), where it meets the Mancunian Way at a roundabout.

=== Princess Road (A57(M) motorway to the M60 motorway) ===
This section is entirely dual carriageway primary route leading in a southerly direction. The entire section is officially called Princess Road, but many locals refer to it as Princess Parkway (see below). This section predominantly has a 30 mph (48 km/h) speed limit. Just before the M60 J5, the speed limit goes up to 40 mph.

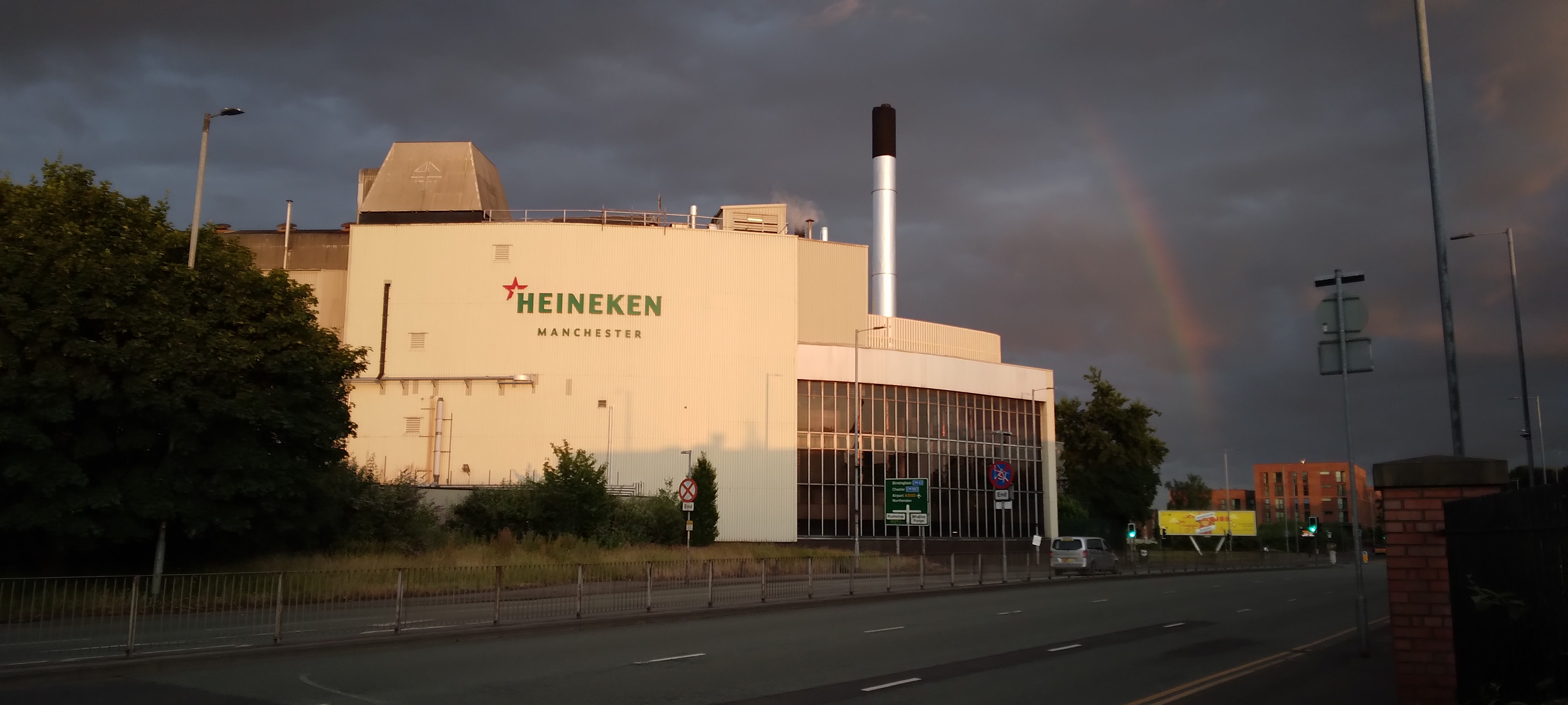
The Heineken brewery beside Princess Road in Moss Side

The road runs through Hulme, Moss Side and Whalley Range, passing William Hulme Grammar School, Whalley Range High School and Southern Cemetery on the way.

This section has many traffic light controlled junctions, including major junctions with the A6010 Manchester middle ring road and A5145 Barlow Moor Road. 0.7 miles (1.1 km) south of its junction with the A5145, the road crosses the River Mersey and meets the M60 motorway at a large free-flow interchange at junction 5. The speed limit also goes up to 40 mph.

=== Princess Parkway (M60 motorway to the M56 motorway) ===
This section is entirely dual carriageway trunk road, and is an important link between the M60 Manchester Outer Ring road and the M56 motorway. This section is called Princess Parkway and largely has a 50 mph (80 km/h) speed limit. Between the M56 and M60, the road has two intermediate junctions; with the B5166 towards Northenden and Sale Moor, and with the A560 leading to Gatley, Wythenshawe and Baguley. Between junctions, the A5103 here has four lanes in each direction with no hard shoulder. Between the on-and-off sliproads of the junctions, it has 3 lanes in each direction with hard shoulder. At the southern end, at the A560 junction, the A5103 seamlessly becomes the mainline of the M56 heading towards Manchester Airport, Chester and the M6 motorway. Northbound traffic on the M56 must leave the mainline of the motorway at a sliproad to remain on the M56. Remaining on the mainline leads directly to the A5103.
