= M602 motorway =

Motorway in England

M602

- M602 highlighted in blue Shown in North West England

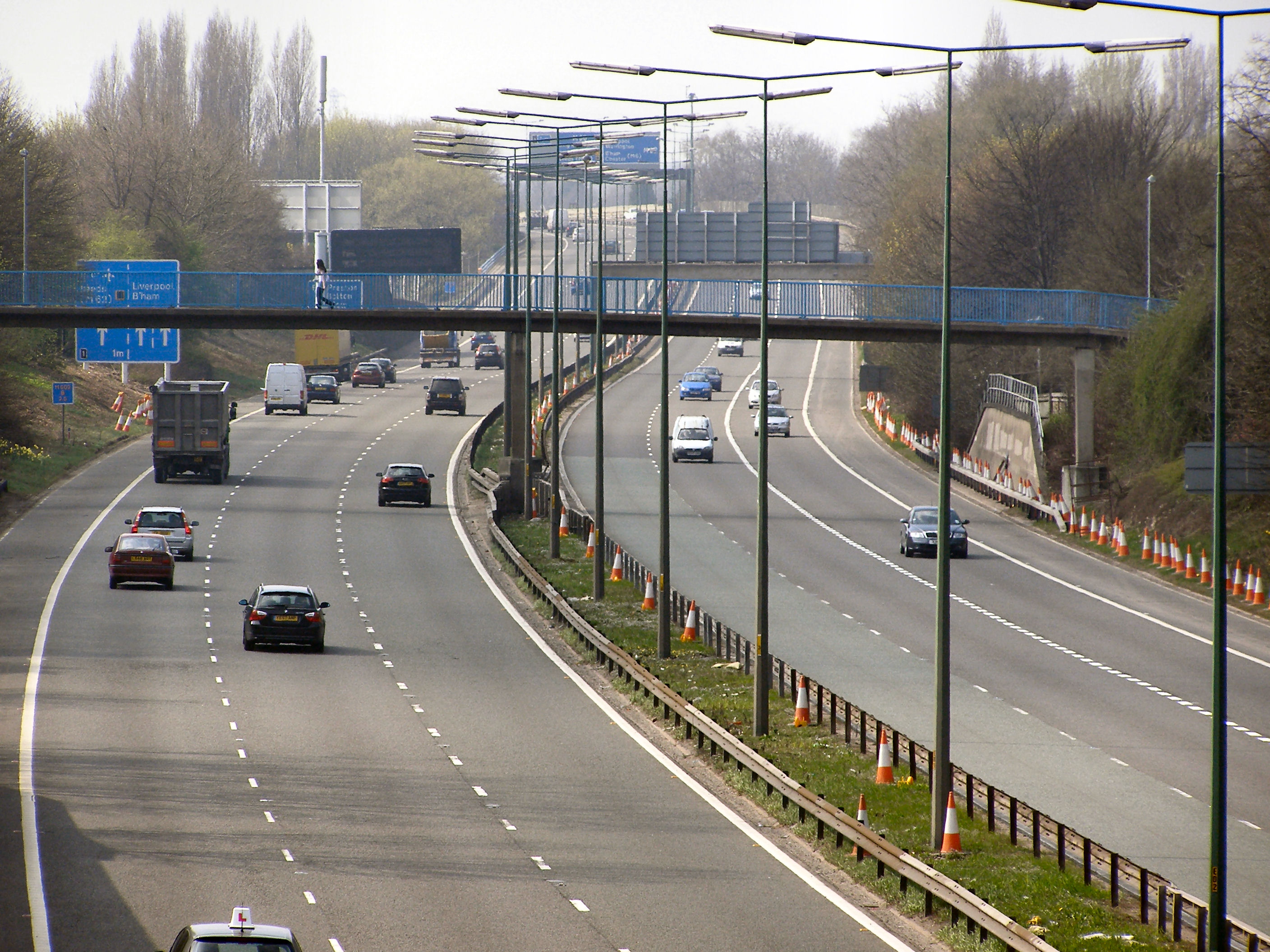

Route information
- Maintained by National Highways
- Length: 4.0 mi (6.4 km)
- Existed: 1971–present
- History: Constructed 1971–82

Major junctions
- West end: Eccles
- J1 → M60 & M62 motorway J2 -> A576 road J3 -> A57 road & A5063 road
- East end: Ordsall, Salford

Location
- Country: United Kingdom
- Primary destinations: Salford

Road network
- Roads in the United Kingdom; Motorways; A and B road zones
← M275	→ M606

The M602 motorway is a 4-mile-long (6 km) motorway, leading traffic into Salford, Greater Manchester, England, towards Manchester city centre and by-passing the town of Eccles.

== History ==
The first section from Worsley to Eccles (now Junction 2) opened in 1971, and the second section from Eccles to Ordsall was completed in 1982.

The motorway itself was originally intended to be a part of a bigger scheme, the South Lancashire Motorway. To be designated M52, the route would have linked Liverpool and Manchester, and would have been built to provide links to the growing UK motorway network.

However, at the same time, the M62 was being extended north and east of Worsley, around the north of Manchester, and on to Yorkshire, to form part of the Trans-Pennine Motorway route. This would be an upgraded version of the original plan of the East Lancashire Road, the A580, but would link onto the existing route at Worsley. It was decided that the Trans-Pennine Motorway be extended to Liverpool too, to provide a cross-country trunk route. The M62 was re-routed to run via the route of the M52 between Worsley and Liverpool. That left a short stump of the original M52 between the M62 and Ordsall, which was initially renumbered M64 and then became the M602. The southern end of the M62 between Worsley and Stretford became the M63 and later the M60.

The M602 was popularised in the film 28 Days Later as the location of the 42nd blockade.

== Junctions ==
M602 motorway junctions
County	Location	mi	km	Junction	Destinations	Notes
Greater Manchester	Eccles	0	0	1 (Note: 53.487°N 2.376°W)	M62 – Liverpool M60 – Manchester Outer Ring Road	
Greater Manchester	Eccles	1.5	2.4	2 (Note: 53.486°N 2.330°W)	A576 – Trafford Park, Salford	
Greater Manchester	Salford	2.4	3.9	3 (Note: 53.479°N 2.282°W)	A5063 – Old Trafford, Salford; A57 – Central Manchester	
1.000 mi = 1.609 km; 1.000 km = 0.621 mi

*Ceremonial Counties

Coordinate list
