= A560 road =

Road in Greater Manchester

A560

Route information
- Length: 17 mi (27 km)

Major junctions
- West end: Altrincham, Greater Manchester A523.

- A538 A5144 A5103 M56; A34 A5149 A5145; A6 A626 A6107 A627
- East end: A57; Hattersley, Tameside

Location
- Country: United Kingdom
- Primary destinations: Timperley, Gatley, Stockport, Woodley and Gee Cross.

Road network
- Roads in the United Kingdom; Motorways; A and B road zones

The A560 is a route in Greater Manchester, England, running from the A56 in Altrincham to Hattersley, Tameside. The route forms part of the A560/B6104 corridor through Stockport, including Great Portwood Street, Carrington Road, Stockport Road West, Stockport Road East and Hyde Road. It also connects with the wider Manchester road network, including links with the A5103 and M56 area.
