= Thurgoland Tunnel =

Disused railway tunnel in Yorkshire, England

Coordinates: 53.500906°N 1.573611°W

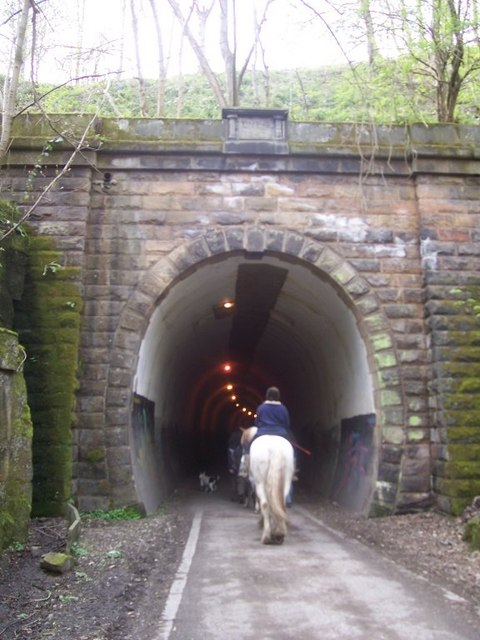
The Trans Pennine Trail passing through the up tunnel

Thurgoland Tunnel is a double-bore abandoned railway tunnel between Penistone and Wortley, in the Metropolitan Borough of Barnsley, South Yorkshire, England. Its total length is 924 feet (282 m). The original tunnel, a single bore carrying two tracks, was opened in 1845 on the Sheffield, Ashton-Under-Lyne and Manchester Railway between Manchester Store Street and Sheffield.

It is characterised by a curve of 60 chains (4,000 ft; 1,200 m) radius on a falling gradient of 1 in 131. Due to the difficulties in laying the original tunnel out, it consists of a series of straight sections in a series of erratic curves varying in radius from 100 to 20 chains (6,600 to 1,300 ft; 2,010 to 400 m). Maximum clearance was only obtained by reducing the normal six-foot spacing between the tracks.

Because of the clearance problems the original construction caused for the planned LNER electrification, and because opening-out was deemed too expensive, in 1948 a second single-line tunnel was built for the up line and the old tunnel was converted to carry only the down line. As this project was begun in 1947 just before railway nationalisation (British Railways), each of the up tunnel portals host twin dates, with "LNER 1947" inscribed in the central parapet panel at the top of the portals and "BR 1948" below in the keystone. Due to the anticipated interim period of steam working before the new electric Woodhead 3 tunnel was completed, a cast-iron smokeplate lined the roof of the tunnel to protect the concrete lining. Electric working commenced in 1954 and ceased in 1981.

The tunnels ceased to carry trains in 1983 when the local Sheffield–Huddersfield train service was diverted via Barnsley.

The up tunnel, being much newer, has been re-utilised for a walking trail, whilst the down bore has been blocked off.

== See also ==
- Manchester-Sheffield-Wath electric railway
