= Thurgoland =

Village and civil parish in South Yorkshire, England

Coordinates: 53.5054°N 1.5635°W

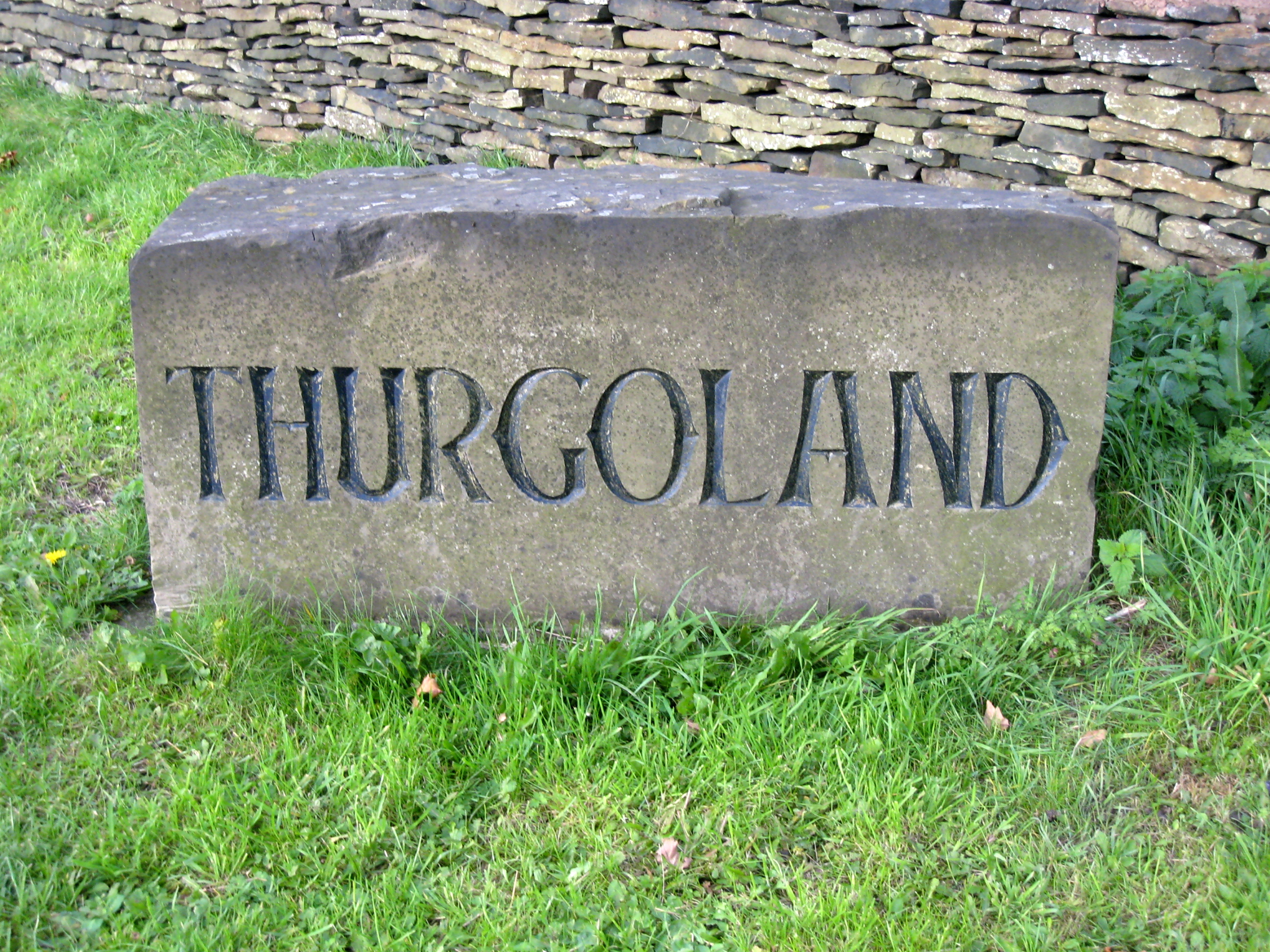
- Boundary stone on the A629

- Location within South Yorkshire
- Population: 1,969 (2001 Census)
- OS grid reference: SE 290 010
- Civil parish: Thurgoland
- Metropolitan borough: Barnsley
- Metropolitan county: South Yorkshire
- Region: Yorkshire and the Humber
- Country: England
- Sovereign state: United Kingdom
- Post town: SHEFFIELD
- Postcode district: S35
- Police: South Yorkshire
- Fire: South Yorkshire
- Ambulance: Yorkshire
- UK Parliament: Penistone and Stocksbridge
- Website: http://www.thurgoland.org.uk/

Thurgoland (/ˈθɜːrɡələnd/, THUR-gə-lənd) is a village and civil parish in the Metropolitan Borough of Barnsley in South Yorkshire, England, on the A629 road.

The village is 5 miles from the centre of Barnsley, the nearest major town.

Nearby Crane Moor and Huthwaite are also part of the Thurgoland C.P.

According to the 2001 census the parish had a population of 1,801, increasing to 1,969 at the 2011 Census.

== Buildings ==
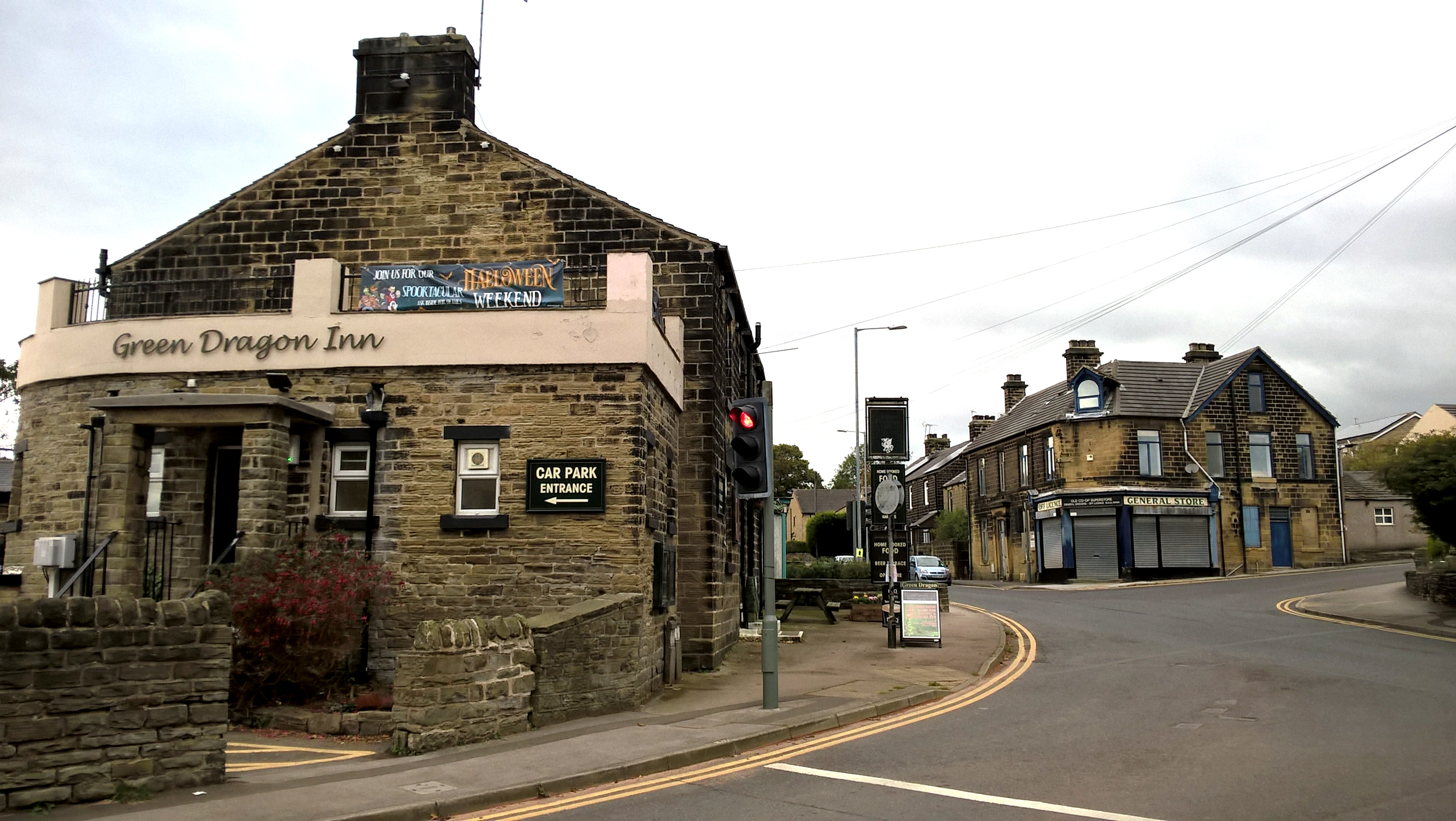
Crossroads with the Green Dragon Inn

The village has one primary school, and Holy Trinity Church, Thurgoland (Church of England), built in 1870. There are three public houses: The Horse & Jockey, The Green Dragon and The Bridge Inn. There are several listed buildings on Huthwaite Lane, including Huthwaite Hall (1748) designed by John Carr. There is a recreational ground at the centre of the village, by the village hall and the youth centre. Thurgoland Junior School is ranked second in the local league table.

== History ==
The earliest known written record of Thurgoland is in the Domesday Book of 1086, in which it is referred to as Turgesland. The name is of Old Norse origin and may mean 'Cultivated land of a man called Thorgeirr'. Other sources claim derivation from the Anglian ‘The fee farm in the Ga of Thor’ – meaning the rented farm on the land named in honour of the god Thor.

Thurgoland is historically part of the West Riding of Yorkshire. The village was part of the ancient parish of Silkstone in the Wapentake of Staincross.

In the 1840s the Sheffield, Ashton-under-Lyne and Manchester Railway was built running past the village. A station was opened at Thurgoland in December 1845, but closed 11 months later. The two-mile-long Thurgoland Coal Branch opened on 24 November 1847 to serve the nearby Stanhope Silkstone Main Colliery.

Thurgoland was a centre for wire drawing mills. There were three wire mills in the parish: Old Wire Mill is thought to date from 1624, New Wire Mill was built around 1717, and Thurgoland Tilt Mill was operating in the 19th century.

== Governance ==
Thurgoland is a civil parish and local issues are governed by a parish council, one of 17 such councils in the Metropolitan Borough of Barnsley. It is in the Penistone East Ward of the Borough, which is represented on the Borough Council by John Wilson, Robert Barnard, and Paul Hand-Davis, all members of the Conservative Party. This ward became part of the new Penistone and Stocksbridge parliamentary constituency in the House of Commons in 2010 and is currently represented by Labour MP Marie Tidball.

== Geography ==
Thurgoland is located on the north side of the River Don, about 4.7 miles (7.5 km) south-west of Barnsley Town Centre and 11 miles (17.7 km) north-west of Sheffield City Centre. The village sits on a hill overlooking a bend in the river at about 820 feet (250 m) above mean sea level.

== Demography ==
At the time of the 2011 Census the population of Thurgoland civil parish was 1,969 people. The ethnic mix was 98.2% white (White British, White Irish, or White Other), 0.4% Asian, 0.2% Black, Caribbean and 0.2% other.

Below is a table outlining population change of the parish since 1911.

Year	1911	1921	1931	1951	1961	1971	2001
Population	1,571	1,623	1,516	1,437	1,551	1,421	1,801
Source: A Vision of Britain through Time

== Transport ==
The main road transport route through Thurgoland is the A629. The closest motorway route is the M1 motorway, which passes to the east of the village. South Pennine Community Transport operates bus routes through the village, linking it to Barnsley, Stocksbridge, Penistone, Sheffield and Stainborough as well as the surrounding villages. The closest mainline railway stations are at Penistone and Silkstone Common.

== Notable people ==
- Thomas Brooks MBE, JP (1880–1958), a British coal miner, politician, MP and spiritualist
- Lieutenant Commander Eugene Esmonde, VC, DSO (1909–1942), a distinguished Irish pilot in the Fleet Air Arm who was posthumously awarded the Victoria Cross (VC)

== See also ==
- Listed buildings in Thurgoland
