= Oxspring railway station =

Disused railway station in South Yorkshire, England

Coordinates: 53.5134°N 1.5955°W

Oxspring

General information
- Location: Oxspring, Barnsley; England

Other information
- Status: Disused

Key dates
- 5 December 1845: Station opened
- 5 November 1847: Station closed
Location

Oxspring railway station was a short lived station built by the Sheffield, Ashton-under-Lyne and Manchester Railway to serve the village of Oxspring, South Yorkshire, England. The station opened on 5 December 1845 but due to cost-cutting measures it was closed, along with Dukinfield Dog Lane, Hazelhead and Thurgoland, on 5 November 1847.

Preceding station	Disused railways	Following station
Penistone	British Railways; Great Central Main Line	Thurgoland
