= Hazlehead Bridge railway station =

Disused railway station in South Yorkshire, England

Hazlehead Bridge
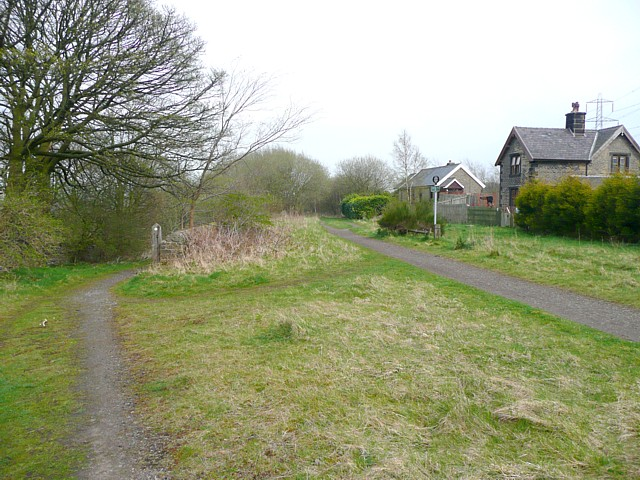
- Site of Hazlehead railway station, Hazlehead, Barnsley.

General information
- Location: Hazlehead, Barnsley; England
- Coordinates: 53.52220°N 1.70910°W
- Grid reference: SE193028
- Platforms: 2

Other information
- Status: Disused

History
- Original company: Sheffield, Ashton-under-Lyne and Manchester Railway
- Pre-grouping: Great Central Railway
- Post-grouping: London and North Eastern Railway

Key dates
- 1 May 1846: opened
- 1 November 1847: closed
- August 1850: reopened
- 6 March 1950: closed (passenger)
- 4 May 1964: closed for freight
Location

Hazlehead Bridge railway station was a railway station on the Sheffield, Ashton-under-Lyne and Manchester Railway's Woodhead Line in the Metropolitan Borough of Barnsley. It served remote rural areas in the Pennine foothills, and was adjacent to the bridge over the Huddersfield Road at Hazlehead.

== History ==
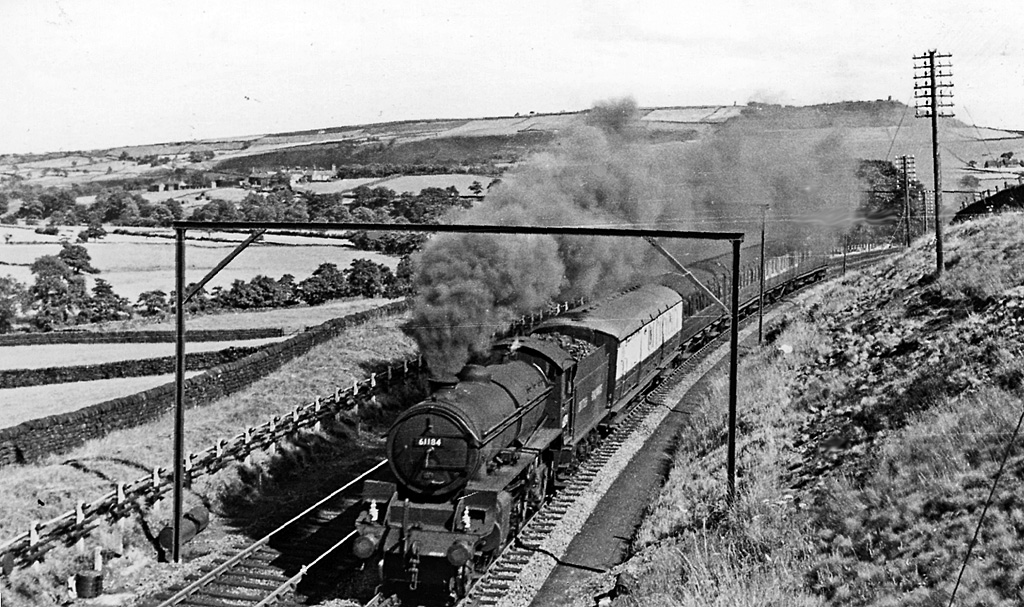
Sheffield - Manchester express at Hazlehead Bridge

The eastern section of the Sheffield, Ashton-under-Lyne and Manchester Railway, between Sheffield (Bridgehouses) and Dunford Bridge, near Barnsley was opened on 14 July 1845, but originally there was no station between Penistone and Dunford Bridge; it had been intended to provide one at Hazlehead Bridge, with bus connections to Huddersfield, but the approach roads were not suitable, and the buses ran to Dunford Bridge instead.

Following petitions from local inhabitants, a station named Hazlehead was opened on 1 May 1846 (as was a station at Dog Lane, near Dukinfield), and the Huddersfield omnibus served Hazlehead station from August.

The original station was closed in a cost-cutting measure, along with Dukinfield Dog Lane. Oxspring and Thurgoland on 1 November 1847. It was reopened at the start of August 1850, and renamed Hazlehead Bridge on 1 November that year; Bradshaw's Railway Guide continued to use the old name for a few months, but only on the table dealing with down trains (i.e. towards Manchester).

At the station, the line fell in the Sheffield direction on a gradient of 1 in 124 (0.81%). The station was built in stone with the main buildings on the Sheffield-bound (Up) platform and a waiting shelter on the other. A high signal box of the Manchester, Sheffield and Lincolnshire Railway's early type, almost square with hipped roof, controlled the station and the entry to the branch line which served the Hepworth Iron Company's works at Crow Edge.

An accident took place at the station on 20 December 1907 when the lean-to building added to the station only a few years earlier was demolished.

The station closed to passenger traffic on 6 March 1950 and to goods traffic in May 1964.

== Notes ==
Preceding station	Disused railways	Following station
Dunford Bridge	SAMR; Woodhead Line	Penistone
