= Dunford Bridge railway station =

Disused railway station in South Yorkshire, England

Dunford Bridge
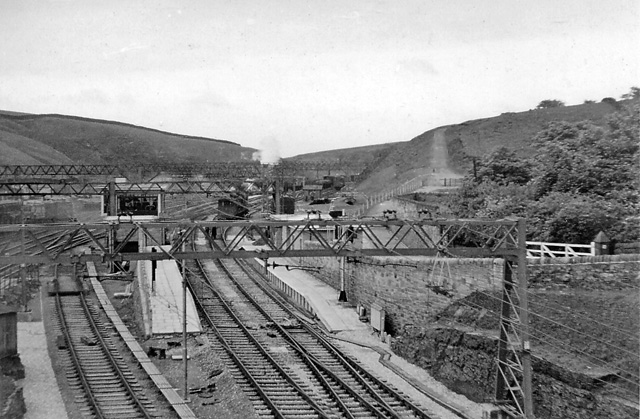
- Dunford Bridge railway station in 1954

General information
- Location: Dunford Bridge, Barnsley; England
- Coordinates: 53.5178°N 1.7628°W
- Grid reference: SE158023
- Platforms: 2

Other information
- Status: Disused

History
- Original company: Sheffield, Ashton-under-Lyne and Manchester Railway
- Pre-grouping: Great Central Railway
- Post-grouping: London and North Eastern Railway

Key dates
- 14 July 1845: opened
- 1954: station moved to new alignment
- 5 January 1970: closed
Location

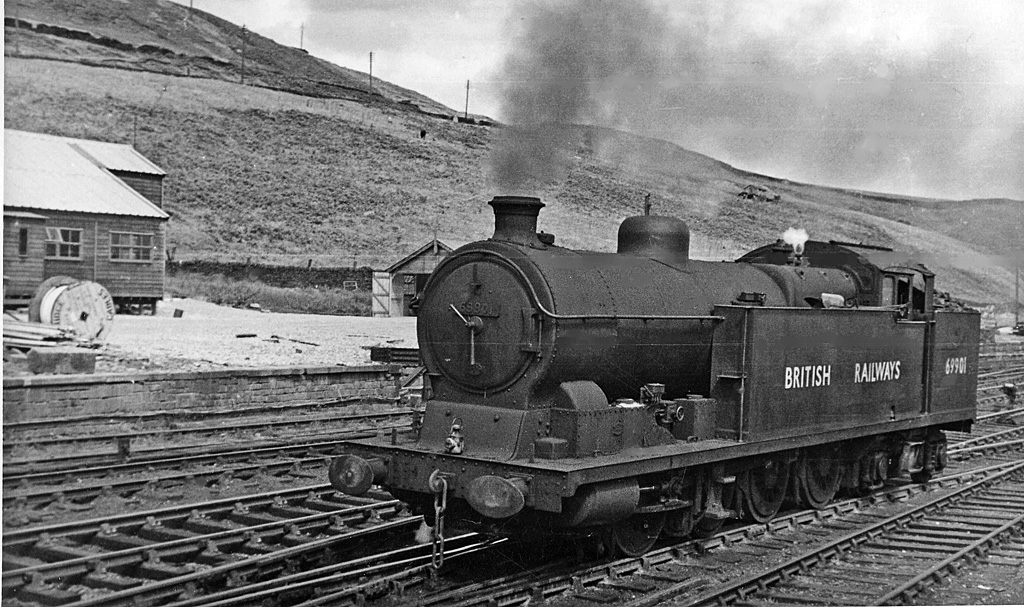
The station in 1950

Dunford Bridge railway station was a railway station that served the village of Dunford Bridge on the Sheffield, Ashton-under-Lyne and Manchester Railway situated immediately east of the Woodhead Tunnel, 5 miles (8 km) west of Penistone, within the Metropolitan Borough of Barnsley, South Yorkshire, England.

The station was 22 miles (35 km) east of Manchester London Road (now Manchester Picadilly) and 20 miles (32 km) west of the now closed Sheffield Victoria station.

== History ==
When the line over Woodhead was opened in 1845 the tunnels were incomplete and a stagecoach service operated from here over the hills to the station at Woodhead. Because the turning space at Hazlehead Bridge was inadequate the stagecoach links in the Huddersfield direction via Holmfirth were also operated from here.

The station was opened on 14 July 1845 and consisted of two flanking platforms, the main, stone built structure, with booking office and staff accommodation was on the Manchester-bound (Down) platform, whilst the Sheffield-bound platform (Up) had a large water tower alongside a stone built waiting shelter. Immediately east of the station was access to sidings which served stone quarries.

The area was controlled from a signal box positioned near the road bridge at the west end of the station but this was replaced by a larger cabin, of the late Manchester, Sheffield and Lincolnshire Railway design, immediately east of the station buildings, on the up platform.

This station was replaced by a modern structure in 1954 when the line was electrified. Still with flanking platforms but now realigned with the line through the "new" Woodhead Tunnel the main building was still on the down platform with a simple waiting shelter on the up.

The station was closed with the passenger services on the line on 5 January 1970.

Preceding station	Disused railways	Following station
Woodhead	SAMR; Woodhead Line	Hazlehead Bridge
