= Wicker Arches =

Railway viaduct in South Yorkshire, England

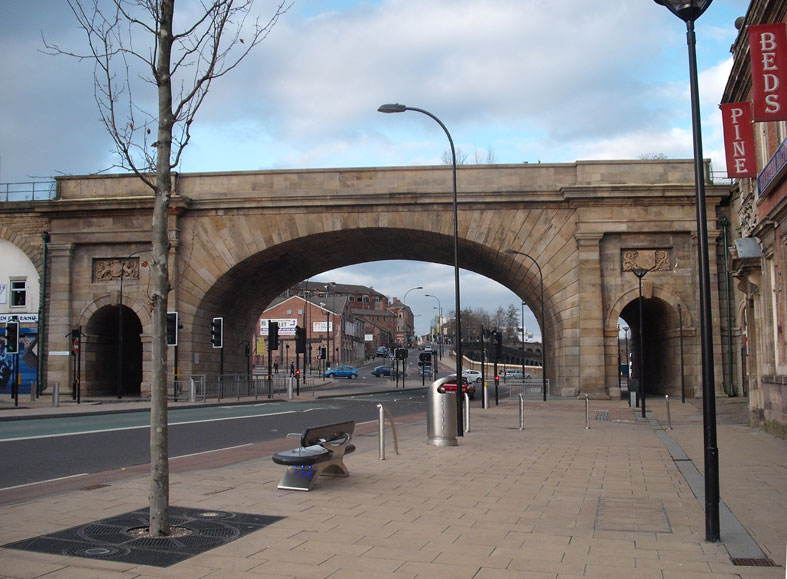
- Coordinates: 53.3883°N 1.4610°W
- Carries: Railway
- Crosses: River Don and the Don Valley
- Locale: Sheffield
- Heritage status: Grade II* listed

History
- Designer: Sir John Fowler
- Construction end: 1848

Location
- Interactive map of Wicker Arches

Wicker Arches form a 660-yard (600 m) long railway viaduct across the Don Valley in the City of Sheffield, England. They take their name from the thoroughfare Wicker, which passes through the main arch of the viaduct and was, until the completion of the Sheffield Parkway, the main route eastwards from the city to the M1. It is a Grade II* listed structure.

== History ==
The viaduct was built in 1848 to extend the Manchester, Sheffield and Lincolnshire Railway from its previous terminus at Bridgehouses. The requirements were laid down by Sir John Fowler (engineer and designer of the Forth Bridge), but because of its prominent position in the city, he employed a firm of architects, Weightman, Hadfield and Goldie, to manage the detailed design. The design was then constructed by Miller, Blackie and Shortridge, and consisted of 41 arches. The arch which crosses the Wicker provides 30 feet (9.1 m) of headroom and spans 72 feet (22 m). On either side are smaller arches around 12 feet (3.7 m) high, with heraldic decoration in the stonework above them. Many of the arches are now concealed by buildings. The structure is officially named the Sheffield Victoria Viaduct, and has in the past been called the Wicker Viaduct.

Later a part of the Great Central Railway, the viaduct supported Sheffield Victoria Station. Main line rail passenger services crossing the Wicker Arches ceased in January 1970 with the closure of Sheffield Victoria and its service to Manchester, but the viaduct still carried the local services to Huddersfield via Penistone until they too were diverted, via Barnsley, in the 1980s. The only other passenger services to cross the bridge thereafter were football excursion trains to Wadsley Bridge for matches played at Sheffield Wednesday's Hillsborough ground. This traffic ceased in 1996.

The Victoria station buildings and platforms were demolished in 1989. Freight services continued to use the, now single, line across the viaduct to reach the Stocksbridge Steel works up to 2023. The arches were restored in 1990 and are a Grade II* listed building. They were added to the Buildings at Risk Register in 2007.

In 2002, the Cobweb Bridge was suspended underneath the viaduct to allow the construction of the Five Weirs Walk.

In spring 2006, the two westernmost arches and the bridge over Brunswick Road were removed and replaced by a single steel span in connection to the building of the final phase of Sheffield's Inner Ring Road.

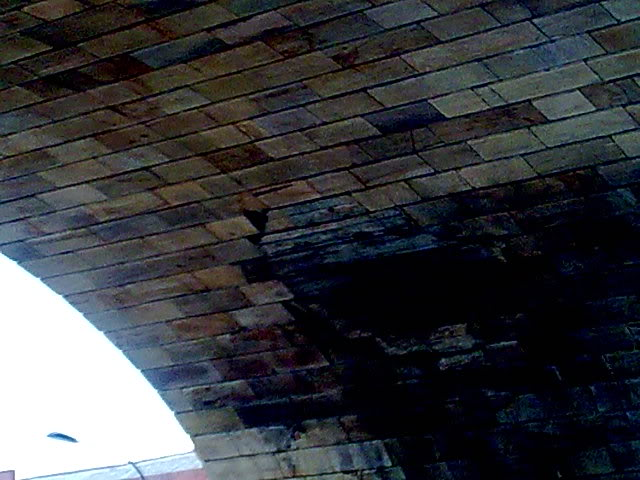
Patchwork on the arches from the Sheffield Blitz bombing raid during the Second World War

The central arch was hit by an unexploded bomb during the Second World War but did not collapse and was repaired. The repair can still be seen today when going under the central arch away from the city centre. It is on the left-hand side of the arch.

The Sheffield University Rag Magazine Twikker is named after The Wicker, and its 1991 cover featured the Wicker Arches.

== See also ==
- List of railway bridges and viaducts in the United Kingdom
