= Thurgoland railway station =

Disused railway station in South Yorkshire, England

Thurgoland

General information
- Location: Thurgoland, Barnsley; England
- Coordinates: 53.49905°N 1.56287°W
- Grid reference: SE290003

Other information
- Status: Disused

History
- Original company: Sheffield, Ashton-under-Lyne and Manchester Railway

Key dates
- 1845: opened
- 1847: closed
Location

Thurgoland railway station was a small railway station built by the Sheffield, Ashton-Under-Lyne and Manchester Railway to serve the village of Thurgoland, South Yorkshire, England and opened on 5 December 1845. Due to cost-cutting measures involving staff and infrastructure the station was closed, along with Dukinfield Dog Lane, Hazelhead and Oxspring on 1 November 1847, making this one of the shortest-lived stations anywhere, with a life span of just one year and 11 months.

Preceding station	Disused railways	Following station
Oxspring	Great Central Railway; Great Central Main Line	Wortley
