= Oxspring =

Village and civil parish in South Yorkshire, England

Coordinates: 53.514°N 1.594°W

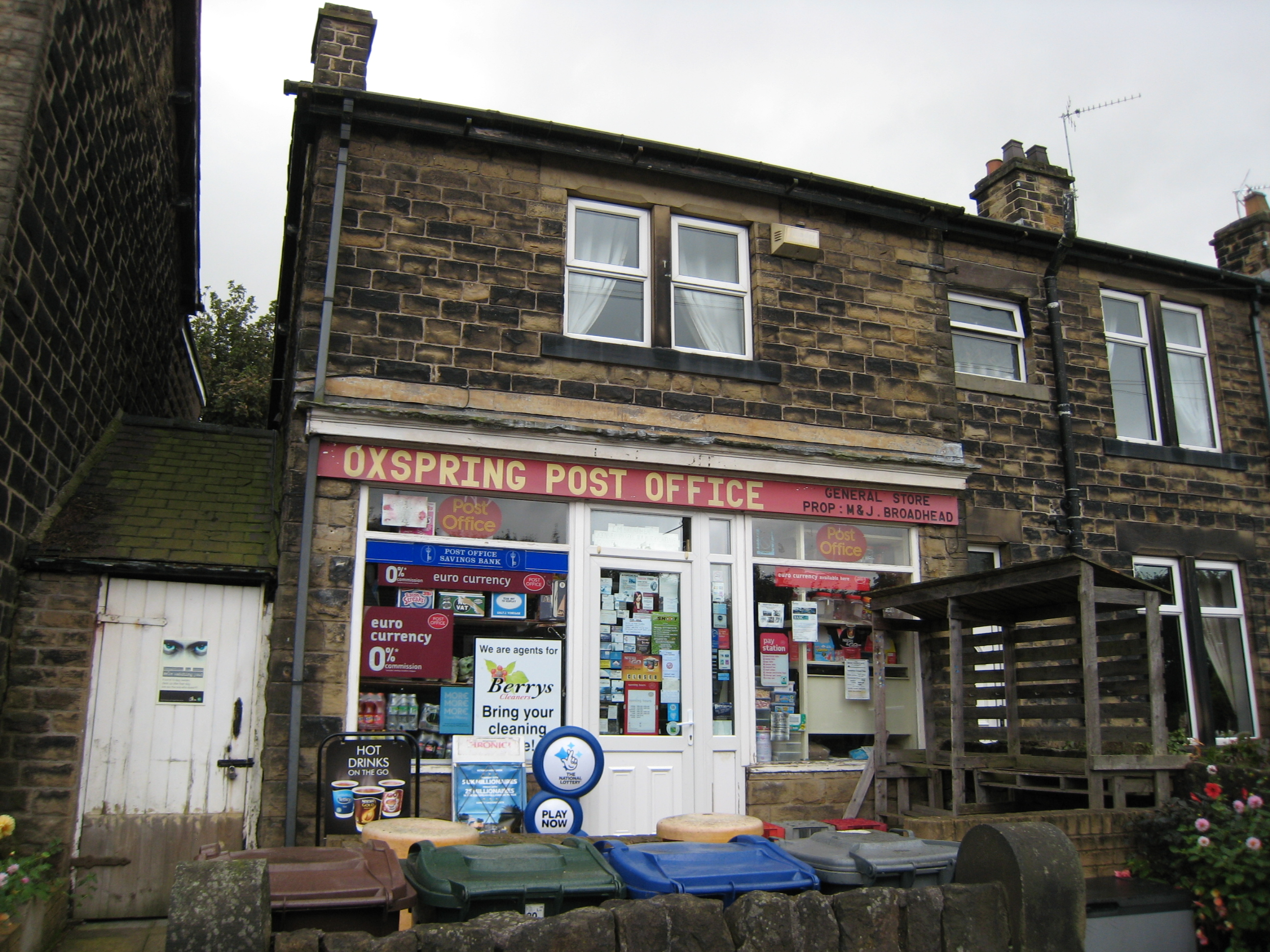
- Oxspring Post Office

- Location within South Yorkshire
- Population: 1,225 (2011)
- OS grid reference: SE270020
- Civil parish: Oxspring
- Metropolitan borough: Barnsley
- Metropolitan county: South Yorkshire
- Region: Yorkshire and the Humber
- Country: England
- Sovereign state: United Kingdom
- Post town: SHEFFIELD
- Postcode district: S36
- Dialling code: 01226
- Police: South Yorkshire
- Fire: South Yorkshire
- Ambulance: Yorkshire
- UK Parliament: Barnsley West and Penistone
- Website: http://www.oxspring-parish.com

Oxspring is a village and civil parish in the Metropolitan Borough of Barnsley in South Yorkshire, England. At the 2001 census it had a population of 1,048, increasing to 1,225 at the 2011 Census. The civil parish includes the hamlets of Clays-Green, Roughbirchworth and Storrs. It is situated on the River Don with the main village being between the Sheffield Road (B6462) and the route of the Trans Pennine Trail. On the other (NE) side of the river is the A629, part of which is called Oxspring Lane, indicating the position of the original hamlet (now High Oxspring Farm). The parish has a post office, a combined C of E church and community hall, St Aidan's, a primary school and three public houses, the Waggon and Horses on the B6462, The Smithy Arms on Bower Hill and the Travellers Inn on the A629. There is a small amount of industry at the north west end.

== History ==
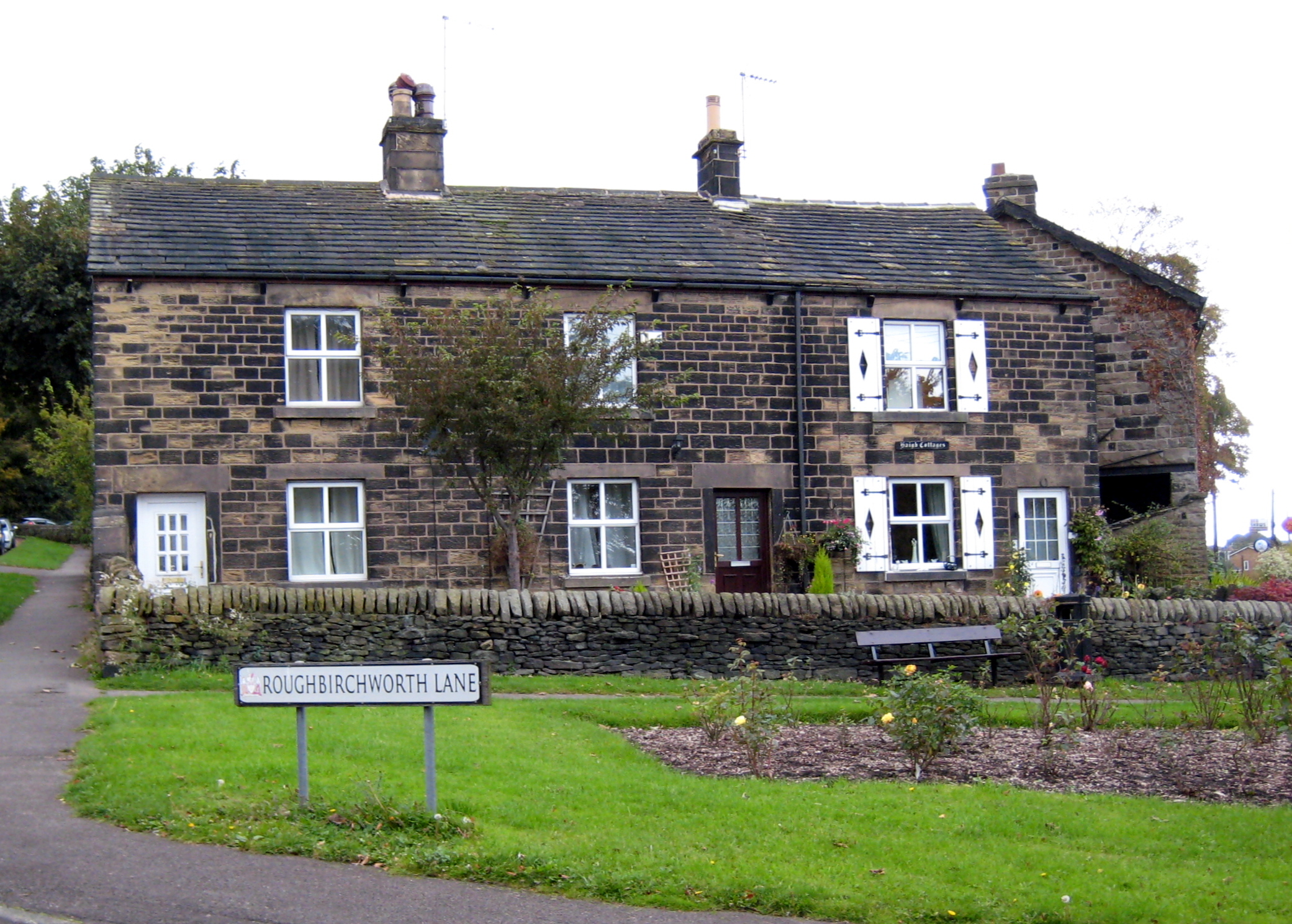
Roughbirchworth Lane, Oxspring

Oxspring is historically part of the West Riding of Yorkshire in the ancient Wapentake of Staincross. The Wapentake almost corresponds with the current Barnsley Metropolitan Area. The village lies within the historic parish of Penistone.

At the time of the Domesday Book the manor of Oxspring (then Ospring) was owned by Lord Swein, who also owned neighbouring [Rough]Birchworth. The book records the combined manors as having the very small value of 2 geld units. It continued to be a collections of isolated buildings and farms for centuries, with Oxspring Lodge completed in 1580, and demolished. The 1772 map by Thomas Jefferys shows the name on the NE side of the River Don, roughly what is now known as High Oxspring. Thus the present main habitation on the SW side mainly dates from industrial activity in the eighteenth century onwards. The Waggon and Horses dates from this time, being converted from a farmhouse and smithy. When the Sheffield, Ashton-under-Lyne and Manchester Railway was being built in the middle of the eighteenth century, the barn of this site was used to house the navvies who built it. The River Don in this area was used to power mills, initially for corn, but later for cloth. In the nineteenth century a wire drawing industry developed and there are still wire drawing mills and associated companies today.

== See also ==
- Listed buildings in Oxspring
- Oxspring railway station
