= Rag (student society) =

Student fundraising charitable group

Rags are student-run charitable fundraising organisations that are widespread in the United Kingdom and Ireland. Some are run as student societies whilst others sit with campaigns within their student unions. Most universities in the UK and Ireland, as well as some in the Netherlands and the Commonwealth countries of South Africa and Singapore have a rag. In some universities rags are known as Charities Campaigns, Charity Appeals, Charity Committees (or Kommittees), Jool or Karnivals, but they all share many attributes.

In the UK, the National Student Fundraising Association (NaSFA), set up in December 2011, exists as a support and resource sharing organisation run by those managing rags for others managing rags.

== Origins ==
The Oxford English Dictionary states that the origin of the word "rag" is from "An act of ragging; esp. an extensive display of noisy disorderly conduct, carried on in defiance of authority or discipline", and provides a citation from 1864, noting that the word was known in Oxford before this date.

Rags flourished in the inter-war period, but were not always aimed at charity. The rivalry between University College London and King's College London led to rags becoming running battles. In 1919, the visiting American prohibitionist William Johnson was kidnapped and subsequently lost an eye during a police rescue attempt, while in 1922 part of the balustrade in the King's College quad was demolished during a battle with UCL students. As well as those in London, rags at Oxford and Cambridge were known for destruction of property and antisocial behaviour. The attack on Newnham College by over a thousand undergraduate men following a vote on degrees for women in 1921 was widely described as a 'rag'.

In 1920 the Birmingham Daily Post noted the start of a shift to rags being charity events at Durham University: "Durham University students have set a new standard in 'rags,' for their programme yesterday was of a constructive rather than destructive type, and as the procession marched through the city a collection was taken for the hospital. This is a good example to the student world, and calculated to do more to commend culture to the people than those meaningless orgies which have taken place elsewhere in the past, to the destruction of property and the detriment of law and order." The following year, 1921, the University of Manchester rag collected money for local medical charities for the first time and students at Cambridge collected for the Haig Fund at a Poppy Day Rag, while in 1923 students at King's College London dressed as ancient Egyptians to raise money for the European War Relief Fund. Glasgow University Students' Unemployment Day, later the university's Charities Week Appeal, started in 1922 and included publication of the Ygorra magazine, with proceeds going to city hospitals and the Lord Provost's Fund for the Unemployed.

In South Africa, a rag was started at the University of Pretoria in the 1920s, and at the University of Witwatersrand in 1922, with charity collections starting in 1929.

More recently, backronyms have been invented for RAG, including "raise and give", "remember and give" and "raising and giving".

== Fundraising ==
=== Rag Week ===
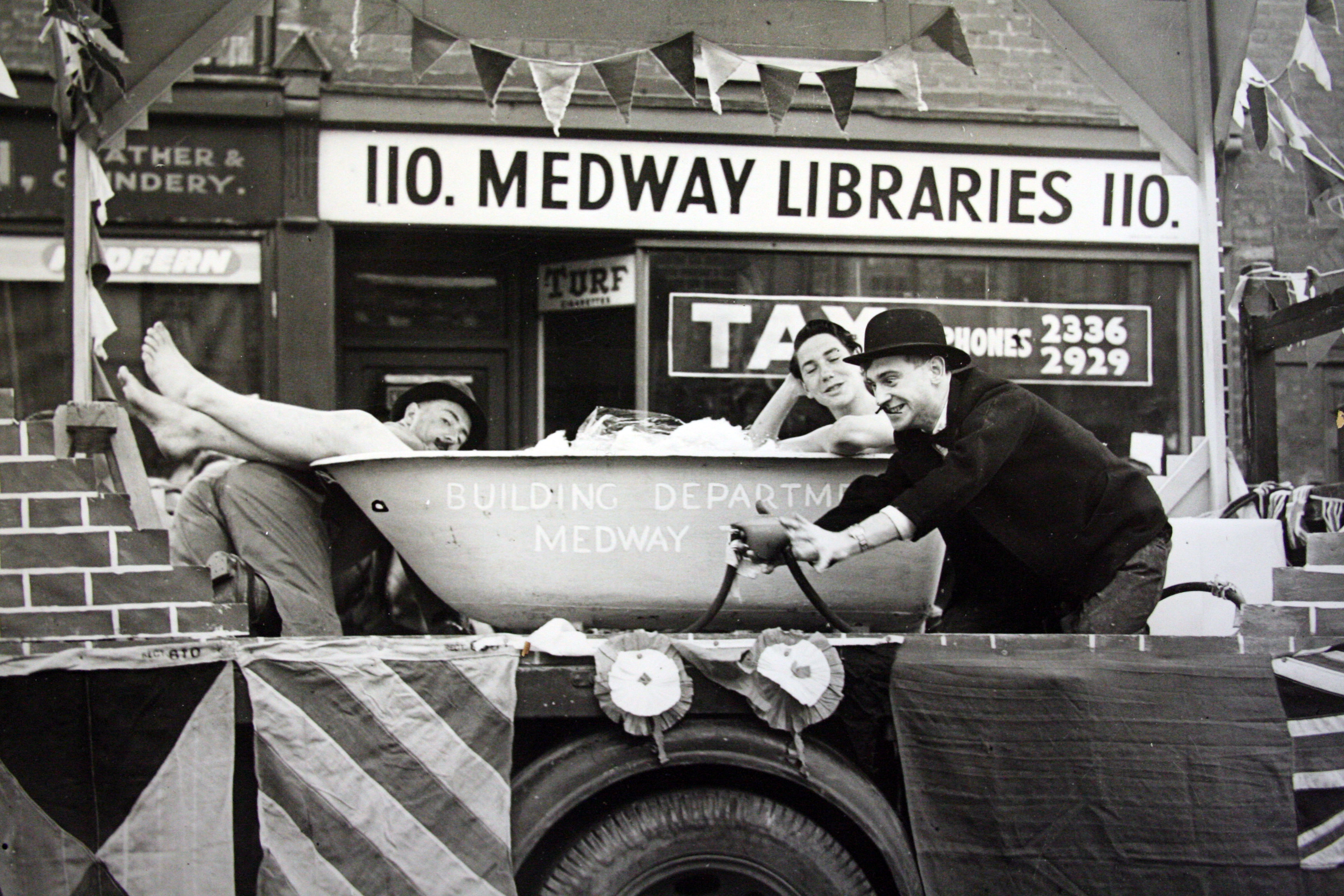
Students take part in the Medway Technical College annual Rag Day parade (1951)

Traditionally fundraising activities have centred on an annual Rag Week, with events each day for the week. While some Rags are only active for this week, others use "Rag Week" as their flagship week to encourage participation for the whole year.

=== Rag mag ===
A rag mag is a small booklet traditionally filled with (now politically incorrect) humour which was sold to the local community during rag week. Possibly some university rags with a strong local tradition still sell their rag mags, however the majority of others use theirs more as information-tools for new students wanting to know more about rag.

An issue of a rag mag dating from 1923, called Goblio, is in the archives of the University of Southampton. The University of Manchester published its Rag Rag in 1924, and provides digital access to a selection of early magazines. Sheffield University Rag's Twikker was first produced in 1925. Queen's University Belfast holds a fairly complete set of rag magazines in its archives, with 81 different copies of PTQ (Pro Tanto Quid – taken from the city's motto "Pro tanto quid retribuamus") from 1927.

=== Sponsored challenges and fundraising events ===
Many rags raise the majority of their money for charity through sponsored challenges and fundraising events. While these vary from University to University, typical examples of each include:

==== Sponsored challenges ====
- "Jailbreaks", competitions to get as far from the start and back again within a set period of time, without spending any money on transport.
- Sponsored skydives
- Sponsored cycling events
- Running events including marathons, half marathons and 'Tough Guy' challenges
- Climbing expeditions
- Sponsored hitch-hikes
- other sponsored game of sports

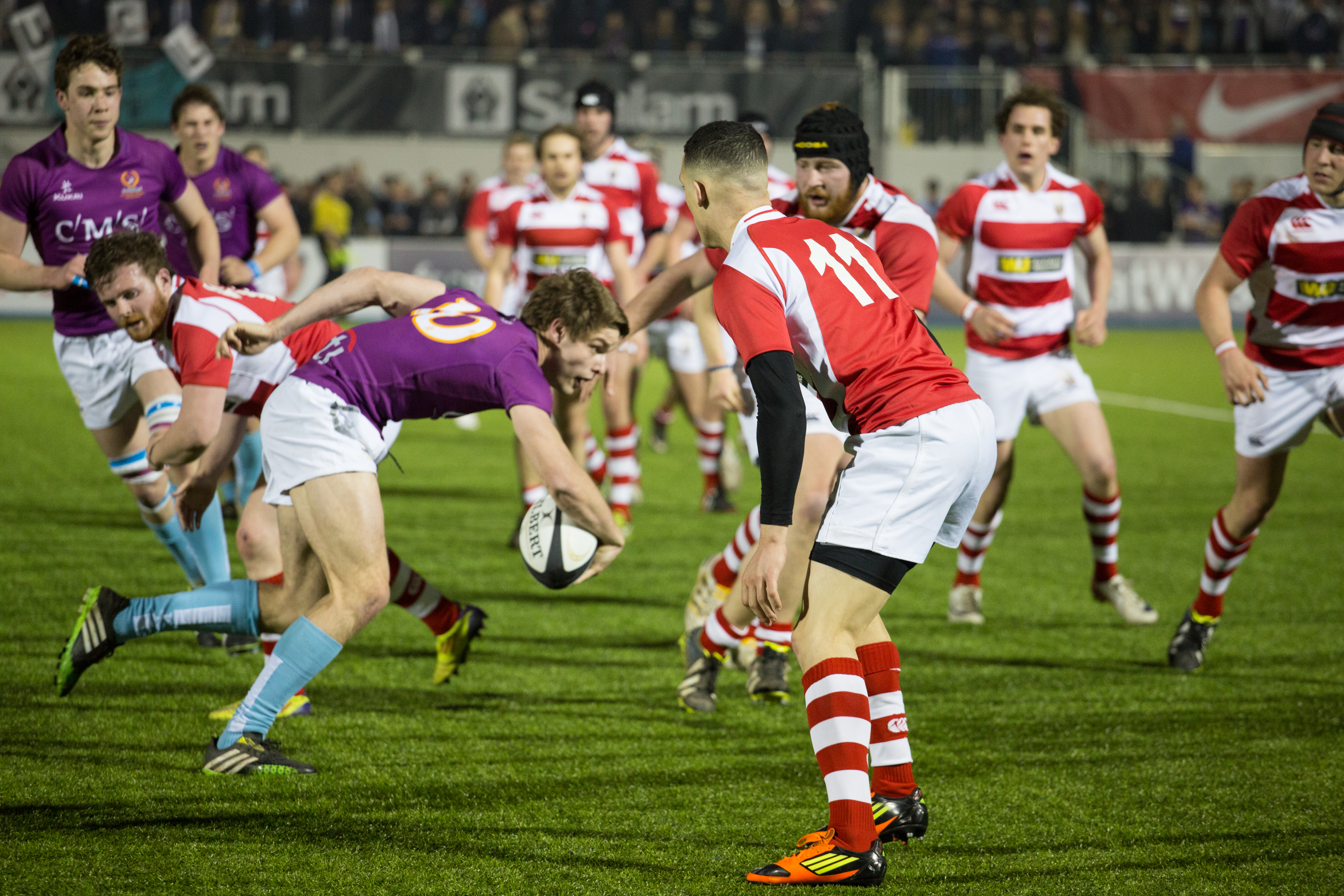
King's College London and University College London, the founding and rival colleges of the University of London, hold their annual varsity rugby rag

==== Fundraising events ====
- Pub crawls
- International Men's Day parties
- World record attempts
- Bed-runs racing teams with hospital beds.
- Pub Quizzes
- Duck races

Manchester RAG also run one of the longest running sponsored events in the North West, known as The Bogle Stroll, which celebrated its semicentennial anniversary in 2011.

Exeter RAG hold the Biggest World AIDS Day event in the UK, called the Safer Sex Ball, Seeing Thousands of students attending to raise money for Charity, £20,000 of which is annually set aside for local AIDS charity the Eddistone Trust.

=== Rag Raids ===
Street Collections: Currently known as 'Raids', volunteer collectors go out into the streets (often in costume) to collect for a specific charity on any given day with buckets rather than the clipboards.

Many Rags also organise week-long 'Tours' over the university holidays in which they will travel from town to town, collecting in each one, and raising thousands of pounds for the beneficiary charity.

Megaraids: A Megaraid is defined as a Raid where more than one Rag is present and in recent years these have been organised on a massive scale by charities with some events taking place consistently for over a decade. Charities which have a developed student fundraising events include Barnardo's, Cancer Research UK, Help the Aged, Hope for Children, Kidscan, Meningitis UK, Meningitis Research Foundation, Meningitis Trust and Worldwide Cancer Research. All Megaraids tend to include a social aspect and often attract former students who still take part.

Carnival RAG, the University of Birmingham's RAG, is one of the largest and most successful in the country, averaging over £200,000 a year for the last 3 years.

== National Student Fundraising Association (NaSFA) (UK) ==
NaSFA is an association of UK student fundraising organisations. It stands for National Student Fundraising Association and was born out of a meeting of 15 heads of UK RAG organisations at the national Rag conference in Durham 2011. These presidents identified a real potential for dramatic increases in efficiency by sharing knowledge and resources. They laid down some fundamental principles, realised a need for a constant and impartial 3rd party facilitator and duly chose the NUS from a selection of applications to support the project.

The underlying aims of NaSFA, to foster sharing of resources, knowledge and support for and between student fundraising organisations contributed to the 30 Rags involved. In December 2011 the original NaSFA founders invited interested parties to an open meeting at the Union of Brunel Students, to ask for approval on what they had been working on and to give Ed Marsh, the vice-president of the NUS, a mandate to drive NUS support forwards through the organisation's structure.

Each summer after 2012, at the National Student Fundraising Conference (Also known as Rag Conference), representatives from each University Students' Union's Rag delegation joined in session for the annual NaSFA Annual General Meeting, where they would elect the following year's NaSFA National Executive Committee.

In the academic year 2014 - 2015, the Elected Committee of NaSFA wrote and had the membership approve the association's constitution.

== National Student Fundraising Conference / Rag Conference (UK) ==
An annual conference for Rag societies and charities is held in the UK. The conference is an opportunity for Rags, student fundraising organisations, charities and associated partners to come together to network, learn and socialise over three action-packed days. In 2012 the conference was held at Loughborough University, and in 2013, the conference was hosted by The University of Birmingham from the 2 to 5 September. In 2014, the conference was held at the University of York from 26 to 28 August. In 2019 it is due to be held in Birmingham after Carnival Rag won the bidding.

The largest National Student Fundraising Conference to date was held at the University of Hertfordshire in August 2016, which included the annual National Student Fundraising Awards.

== See also ==
- Shinerama, an annual and traditional cross-Canadian university fundraising campaign functioning similarly to the UK's Rag Week tradition
