= Twikker =

Tales From The Twikker: Twikker 1991 cover by D'Israeli. A pastiche of classic Marvel comic covers, incorporating the Wicker Arches. The money spider 'Seb Toots' is the traditional emblem of Sheffield Rag.

Twikker 1961 cover – The Pin-Up calendar referred to was very tame even by the standards of the day. Some of the beauties are dressed in one piece bathing attire as worn in the early 1900s at the seaside.

Twikker 1995 cover

Twikker was the Rag Mag of Sheffield University Rag. The name is a corruption of The Wicker, a well-known street in Sheffield, South Yorkshire, England crossed at one end by the Wicker Arches (a railway viaduct).

('Twikker' is also the name of a rock climb in Derbyshire, first climbed (and therefore named) by a member of the Sheffield University Mountaineering Club.)

Sheffield Rag first produced a magazine in 1926, named "The Star", and by 1928, 85,000 copies were sold. It was renamed Twikker in 1930. Rag itself was banned in 1942 until the war ended, although the 1943 Twikker was written by torchlight in a bomb shelter! Publication of Twikker resumed in 1947. It is thought to be the longest-lasting example of the genre, although there are other claimants.

It is possible to follow the taste, or lack of it, of humour over the years through its content. Many jokes from the 1930s to 1950s were lacking in sexual innuendo but were casually racist and sexist by today's standards. Since the 1960s jokes were much 'nearer the knuckle'. In the 1980s racism and sexism were dropped or bowdlerised (e.g. Irish jokes became jokes about Mechanical Engineers). A particular example from 1939 is notable: "Advice to Hitler – Don't be vague, ask for Prague" (a reference to the Munich agreement and the advertising tagline for Haig scotch). Present-day inclusion of Adolf Hitler in humour is widely considered beyond the pale, and was notably absent from post-war Twikkers.

The intention was generally to make the content as racy as possible, to boost sales, but at the risk of being banned: Twikker 1938 was withdrawn after leading churchmen complained of its 'obscenity'. There are reports of the 1949 edition changing hands for £1 after its ban by the University for "offensive" material, It upset the Lord Mayor of Sheffield, who traditionally bought the first copy, and was debated in the City Council, who labelled it "a disgrace to education" and the 1950 edition was banned comprehensively – no copy exists today – and its editor was sent down from University. The students published an alternative called 'Ragout' to raise funds that year. Twikker 1959 provoked complaints from the public and later editions courted controversy from Women's Liberation groups, ceasing its pin-ups in 1975 following a protest.

== Notable contributors ==
Hans Kornberg was the editor in 1947.

The 1991 cover was created by D'Israeli.

Forewords have been written by Michael Palin, Andy Hamilton and Miles Kington in addition to the traditional Lord Mayor's foreword.
