= Bogle Stroll =

Fundraising event in Manchester, England

The Bogle Stroll
- Genre: Sponsored Walk/Cycle
- Locations: Greater Manchester, England
- Inaugurated: 1961
- Organiser: Manchester Rag
- Website: www.bogle.org.uk

The Bogle Stroll is a sponsored 55-mile walk conducted annually in Manchester, United Kingdom. Participants in the walk raise money for a charity of their choice.

== History ==
Starting in 1961, when UMIST lecturers walking from Lancaster back to Manchester spotted an imp, the Bogle has run every year since and is now one of the longest running sponsored events in the North West, and will celebrate its 55th year in 2016. In the 1970s, the stroll was described as "the largest sponsored charity walk in England".

A bogle is a phantom or imp. In the early years of the Bogle Stroll the imp was given the name Fred Bogle. An image of Fred hitting his head with a hammer was used as the mascot of the Bogle Stroll and used on bibs used by participants and certificates given out to finishers of the stroll. Green ties with red bogles were awarded to all finishers.

== Events ==
The Bogle is known as a sponsored walk, but also offers participants the option of cycling the event. Currently comprising four main events, the Bogle features many distances that range in difficulty.

=== The Bogle Stroll ===
The Bogle Stroll is the most popular event of the four available where participants walk approximately 55 miles around Greater Manchester through the night. Walkers tackle what is known as the North and South Loops, forming a figure of eight around Manchester. Every year, the Bogle Stroll sees close to 50% of those who enter finish, leaving the rest to drop out at various points. To ensure the safety of walkers the Bogle Stroll must be completed in under 24 hours.

=== The Bogle Ramble ===
The Bogle Ramble is a shorter alternative to the Bogle Stroll, covering approximately 26 miles around the north of Manchester. Participants don't walk through the night during this event and instead walk the North Bogle Loop, before finishing back at the start point. The Bogle Ramble is sometimes misinterpreted as a marathon, yet the Bogle Ramble covers difficult terrain with open roads and is therefore not recommended to be run.

=== The Bogle Wander ===
The Bogle Wander is the shortest of the four events where participants walk approximately 12 miles of the North Bogle Loop. As the Bogle Wander is the shortest route, it is also the least popular but is still not an easy challenge.

=== The Bogle Roll ===
The Bogle Roll is an alternative event, in which participants cycle the route rather than walk. Cyclists cover approximately 78 miles by covering the North Bogle Loop three times whilst tackling various hills and difficult stretches of road. With roads open and other walkers around the route, participants must tackle more than just the distance and gives the option for cyclists to cycle shorter distances if desired.

== Event organisation ==
Following the merger of UMIST and Victoria University of Manchester, forming the current University of Manchester, the fundraising body ‘Manchester Rag' took on the organisation and planning of the event. This has resulted in this event being run solely by students who are in full-time study in Manchester.

The event also relies on a large volunteering team who are responsible for the overall safety and management of checkpoints that are located along the route. These volunteers include:

- First Aiders
- Van/Minibus Drivers
- University lecturers
- Checkpoint Marshalls
- Bogle Control Team

== First-place 55-mile strollers ==
2016 - Michael Jones | 5 hours 58 minutes
2015 - Luke Smith | 14 hours 27 minutes
2014 - Craig Cavanagh | 14 hours 21 minutes
2013 - Steve Judd | 9 hours 39 minutes
2012 - Simon Baker | 12 hours 25 minutes
2011 - Richard Saint/Lee Bawn | 16 hours 04 minutes
2010 - Clayton Malcolnson/Adrian Zoch | 14 hours 56 minutes
2009 - Tim Budd | 15 hours 40 minutes
2007 - Sarah 'Beeny' Benito | 14 hours 15 minutes
2004 - Richard O'Regan | 16 hours 15 minutes [Carried a rucksack estimated to be approximately 10kg (22lb)]
2003 - Benj Ellerby | 8 Hours 17 minutes
1984 - Mike Corne | 8 hours 55 minutes

1983 - Zara Hyde | 9 hours 15 minutes

1981 - Andy Bright | 7 hours 39 minutes
1978 - Joe Ritson | 7 hours 9 minutes
1977 - Joe Ritson | 7 hours 14 minutes (Manchester to Manchester via Wigan, Chorley starting at Midnight)
1968 - Martin Banfield | 9 hours 45 minutes (Lancaster to Manchester via A6, starting at 2100)

== Previous events ==
Below is a table of the past events and how much they raised for local and national charities.

Year	Organiser	Amount Raised
2014	Jo Tripney and Stacia Yong	£20,695.87
2013	Claire Smith and Alex Crabtree	£46,648
2012	Tom Bartley and Dermot Quinn	£35,000
2011	Paul Robertson	£35,279.13
2010	Matt Bennett	£17,000
2009	Matt Bennett	
