= Listed buildings in Thurgoland =

Thurgoland is a civil parish in the metropolitan borough of Barnsley, South Yorkshire, England. The parish contains 17 listed buildings that are recorded in the National Heritage List for England. Of these, one is listed at Grade II*, the middle of the three grades, and the others are at Grade II, the lowest grade. The parish contains the village of Thurgoland and the surrounding countryside. Most of the listed buildings are houses and cottages, farmhouses and farm buildings. The other listed buildings are a former wire works, two bridges, a church, and a milepost.

== Key ==
Grade	Criteria
II*	Particularly important buildings of more than special interest
II	Buildings of national importance and special interest

== Buildings ==
Name and location	Photograph	Date	Notes	Grade
Far Coates Farmhouse; 53.52396°N 1.58269°W	—	17th century	The farmhouse is in stone, and has a stone slate roof with chamfered gable copings on cut kneelers. There are two storeys and an attic, and the farmhouse consists of a main range, a later cross-wing, and an attic. It has a 20th-century porch, most of the windows are mullioned, with some mullions missing, some windows have hood moulds, and in the upper floor is a round-headed fire window.	II
Huthwaite Farmhouse, brewhouse and garage 53.50015°N 1.57408°W	—	17th century	The brewhouse is the oldest part, with the rest dating from the 18th century or later, and they have been incorporated into two dwellings. They are in stone with stone slate roofs. The farmhouse has two storeys, the garage and brewhouse have one. The houses have six bays, the garage is to the left and the brewhouse is at the rear.	II
Pule Hill Hall and cottage 53.51231°N 1.56893°W		1671	The cottage is the older, the house dating probably from the later 18th century. They are in stone, the rear is rendered, the cottage has a roof of stone slate, and the house roof is tiled with gable copings on cut kneelers. Both buildings have two storeys and three bays. The cottage has a doorway with a moulded surround and an initialled and dated lintel. The house has a central doorway, a plaque with a shield support and a helm, and an added bay at each end. Most of the windows in both buildings are mullioned.	II
Far Coates Cottage (east); 53.52369°N 1.58167°W	—	Late 17th century	The cottage is in stone with quoins and a stone slate roof. There are two storeys, two bays, and a continuous rear outshut. The central doorway has been inserted, the original doorway to the right is blocked, and has a stepped chamfered lintel and a quoined surround. The windows are 20th-century casements with the original mullions removed.	II
Far Coates Cottage (west); 53.52376°N 1.58185°W	—	Late 17th century	A stone cottage with quoins and a stone slate roof. There are two storeys and two bays, and a rear outshut. The central doorway has been inserted, the original doorway to the right is blocked, and has a deep lintel and a quoined surround. The windows are 20th-century casements with the original mullions removed. Above the ground floor openings is a hood mould, rising over the original doorway.	II
Toad Hole Hill Farmhouse and two cottages 53.51199°N 1.55833°W		17th or early 18th century	The building is in stone, with quoins, and a stone slate roof with chamfered gable copings on moulded kneelers. There are two storeys, a front range of five bays, and two rear wings, giving an F-shaped plan. The doorways on the front have quoined surrounds and Tudor arched lintels, and the windows are mullioned. There is a continuous hood mould over the ground floor openings, rising over the doorways as hoods.	II
Roper House; 53.50729°N 1.57214°W	—	1742	The house is rendered, with quoins, stone gutter brackets, a roof of Welsh slate in the main part and stone slate on the rear wing, and gable copings on moulded kneelers. There are two storeys, a symmetrical front of three bays, and a lower rear wing. The central doorway has a quoined surround, and a lintel with a dated keystone. The windows are mullioned.	II
Huthwaite Hall; 53.50004°N 1.57387°W		1748	A large house designed by John Carr in Palladian style. It is in stone, the ground floor rusticated, with quoins, a sill band, a modillion eaves cornice, and a Welsh slate roof with gable copings on moulded kneelers. There are three storeys and a symmetrical front of five bays. The central doorway has a Gibbs surround and a triangular pediment. The windows are sashes in moulded architraves, those in the ground floor also with Gibbs surrounds, and in the middle floor with pulvinated friezes and cornices, the central window with a swept architrave and an apron. At the rear is a two-storey round-arched stair window.	II*
Former wire works 53.49431°N 1.57218°W	—	Mid 18th century (probable)	The former wire works is in stone with some brick, quoins, and roofs of Welsh slate and stone slate. There is a single storey, a north–south range of four bays with a short gabled wing, and a three-bay wing at an angle. The openings include doorways with quoined surrounds, and windows, most of which are mullioned.	II
Farm building, Huthwaite Farm; 53.50041°N 1.57436°W	—	Late 18th century	The farm building is in stone with quoins and a Welsh slate roof. There are two storeys, five bays, and a rear outshut. The building contains two doorways with heavy surrounds, three square windows, and two square pitching holes, and in the right gable end is an open Venetian window.	II
Sharp Ford Bridge; 53.49646°N 1.56050°W		c. 1800	The bridge carries Forge Lane over the River Don. It is in stone and consists of a single segmental arch. The bridge has voussoirs, a band at road level, plain parapets, and curved walls on each side.	II
Berry Moor Farmhouse; 53.52467°N 1.56332°W	—	Late 18th or early 19th century	A stone farmhouse, with quoins, and a stone slate roof with gable copings on moulded kneelers to the left. There are two storeys and a symmetrical front of three bays. The central doorway has a raised lintel, and the windows are mullioned.	II
Farm building southwest of Huthwaite Farmhouse; 53.50011°N 1.57449°W	—	Late 18th or early 19th century	The farm building is in stone with a stone slate roof. There are two storeys, and it contains two entrances, one blocked, and two windows in each floor.	II
Former stable range west of Huthwaite Farmhouse; 53.50029°N 1.57456°W	—	Early 19th century	The former stable range is in stone with quoins and a hipped stone slate roof. There are two storeys and seven bays. Along the ground floor is an archivolted arcade with stone piers and voussoirs. The upper floor contains three doorways, the middle one with a plinth and impost blocks, and four square pitching holes.	II
Thurgoland Bridge; 53.51160°N 1.58306°W		Early 19th century	The bridge carries Sheffield Road (B6462 road) over the River Don. It is in sandstone, and consists of a single segmental arch. The bridge has piers flanking the arch and at the ends, a band, and a parapet with triangular coping.	II
Milepost; 53.51135°N 1.58173°W	—	Mid to late 19th century	The milepost is on the northeast side of Thurgoland Bank (B6462 road). It is in cast iron, with a triangular plan, a hollow back, and sloping faces. Raised lettering indicates the distances to Sheffield and Penistone.	II
Holy Trinity Church; 53.50587°N 1.56633°W		1870–71	The church was designed by G. E. Street, and the vestry by Sir Charles Nicholson was added in 1930–32. The church is built in stone, and is in Decorated style. It consists of a nave, a south aisle, a north porch, and a chancel with a south transept and a north organ chamber and vestry. On the west gable is a bellcote.	II
