= Ardwick railway station =

Railway station in Manchester, England

Ardwick
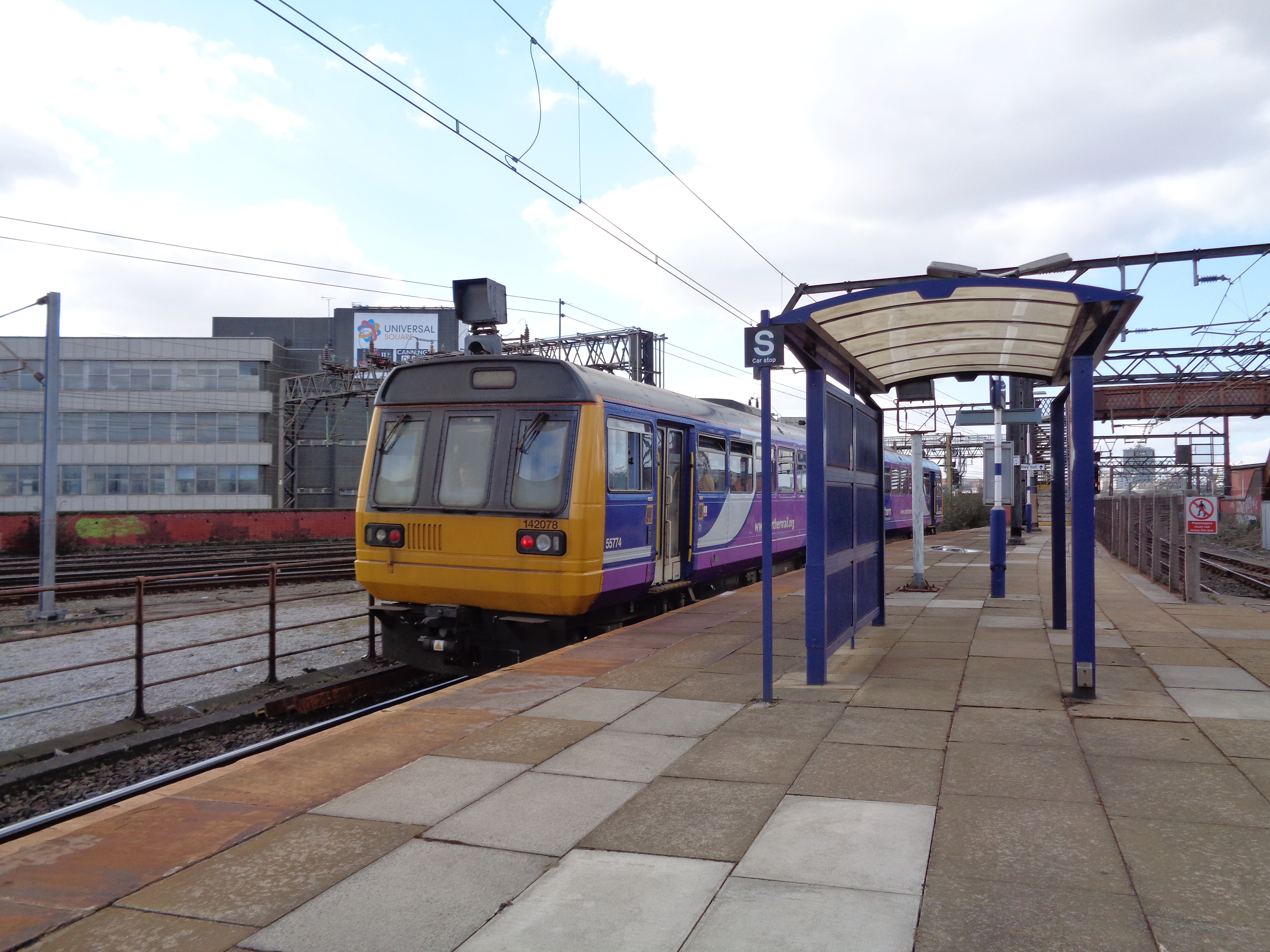
- A Northern Rail Class 142 Pacer passing Ardwick station in 2015

General information
- Location: Ardwick, Manchester; England
- Coordinates: 53°28′16″N 2°12′47″W
- Grid reference: SJ858972
- Manager: Northern Trains
- Transit authority: Transport for Greater Manchester
- Platforms: 2

Other information
- Station code: ADK
- Classification: DfT category F2

History
- Original company: Sheffield, Ashton-under-Lyne and Manchester Railway
- Pre-grouping: Great Central Railway
- Post-grouping: London and North Eastern Railway

Key dates
- November 1842: Station opened

Passengers
- 2021/22: ▲404
- 2022/23: ▼324
- 2023/24: ▲396
- 2024/25: ▼262
- 2025/26: ▲364
Location
Notes
- Passenger statistics from the Office of Rail and Road

Ardwick railway station in Ardwick, Manchester, England, is about one mile (1.5 km) south-east of Manchester Piccadilly, on the Glossop and Hope Valley Lines. Plans to close the station were shelved in 2006 due to increasing activity in the area. From the Summer 2024 timetable, the station has two trains calling on Mondays–Fridays and one on Saturdays.

== History ==
Ardwick station was opened by the Sheffield, Ashton-under-Lyne and Manchester Railway in 1842. The station became a junction between the London, Midland and Scottish Railway and the London and North Eastern Railway under the Grouping of 1923, and passed to the London Midland Region of British Railways on nationalisation in 1948.

From 1878 to 1902, there was also an Ardwick stop shown on Crewe–Manchester line timetables for collection of Manchester tickets on down trains.

In its draft Route Utilisation Strategy (RUS) for the North West, Network Rail proposed the closure of Ardwick, but the closure proposals were dropped from the final report published on 1 May 2007. Proposals to close Ardwick and two other stations in Greater Manchester were shelved after residents and passenger groups persuaded Network Rail that long-term development could improve the business case for keeping the stations open.

The station is supposedly little-known even among locals, in part due to its location and limited service.

== Facilities ==
Ardwick is unstaffed and has a single island platform on the electrified Glossop line and the Hope Valley Line. Pedestrians can enter the platform from a footbridge, but there is no wheelchair access. It is immediately adjacent to the main Manchester branch of the West Coast Main Line and the two routes join just north of the station.

The station has a ticket machine and a seating area.

== Services ==
Northern Trains operates the only daily services that stop at Ardwick; these are the 07:16 to Manchester Piccadilly only and the 16:57 to New Mills Central on Mondays–Fridays. On Saturdays there is only the 07:16 to Manchester Piccadilly. There is no service on Sundays.

The lines passing through the station are used intensively by non-stop trains and this, coupled with its location in a largely non-residential area, accounts for its infrequent service.

Preceding station	National Rail	Following station
Ashburys	Northern Trains Hope Valley Line Limited Service	Manchester Piccadilly

== Bibliography ==
- Butt, R. V. J. (October 1995). The Directory of Railway Stations: details every public and private passenger station, halt, platform and stopping place, past and present (1st ed.). Sparkford: Patrick Stephens Ltd. p. 18. ISBN 978-1-85260-508-7. OCLC 60251199. OL 11956311M.
- Jowett, Alan (2000). Jowett's Nationalised Railway Atlas (1st ed.). Penryn, Cornwall: Atlantic Transport Publishers. ISBN 978-0-906899-99-1. OCLC 228266687.
- Marshall, Geoff; Pipe, Vicki (2018). The Railway Adventures: Places, Trains, People and Stations. September Publishing. ISBN 978-1910463871.
