= Listed buildings in Oxspring =

Oxspring is a civil parish in the metropolitan borough of Barnsley, South Yorkshire, England. The parish contains two listed buildings that are recorded in the National Heritage List for England. Both the listed buildings are designated at Grade II, the lowest of the three grades, which is applied to "buildings of national importance and special interest". The parish contains the village of Oxspring and the surrounding area. Both the listed buildings are bridges over the River Don

== Buildings ==
Name and location	Photograph	Date	Notes
Willow Bridge; 53.51964°N 1.59858°W		17th century (probable)	A former packhorse bridge crossing the River Don, it is in stone, and consists of a single slightly pointed arch. The bridge has voussoirs, parapet, and coping.
Oxspring Bridge; 53.51486°N 1.59022°W		18th century (probable)	The bridge crosses the River Don, it is in stone, and consists of a single segmental arch. The bridge has a coped parapet, a band, and splayed ends. To the right is a triangular abutment, and to the right of this is a small subsidiary arch.
