= Bridgehouses railway station =

Disused railway station in South Yorkshire, England

Bridgehouses
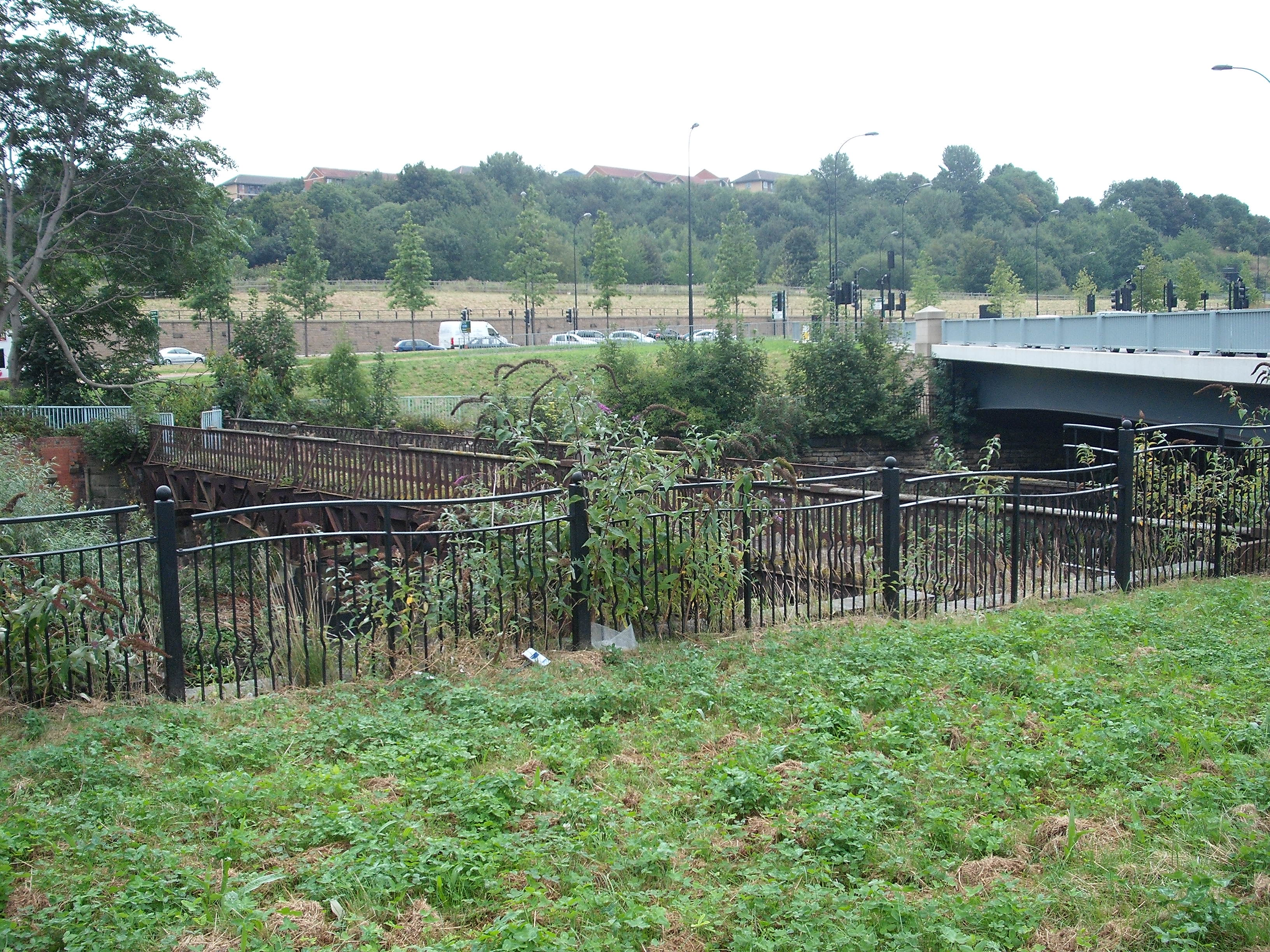
- The view across the River Don to the former site of Bridgehouses Station, August 2009

General information
- Location: Burngreave, City of Sheffield; England
- Coordinates: 53.389716°N 1.466400°W
- Grid reference: SK355882

Other information
- Status: Disused

History
- Original company: Sheffield, Ashton-under-Lyne and Manchester Railway
- Pre-grouping: Manchester, Sheffield and Lincolnshire Railway, Great Central Railway
- Post-grouping: London and North Eastern Railway, London Midland Region of British Railways

Key dates
- 1845: Opened
- 15 September 1851: Closed to passengers
- 2 October 1965: Closed to freight
Location

Bridgehouses railway station was the terminal station of the Sheffield, Ashton-under-Lyne and Manchester Railway from its opening in 1845 until the opening of the Wicker Arches, a 660-yard (600 m) long viaduct across the Don Valley, which supported the new Sheffield Victoria opened on 15 September 1851. On 1 January 1847 a 1/2-mile (0.8 km) connecting line to the Wicker station of the Midland Railway had been constructed in order to increase goods traffic and enable wagon transfers. This short steeply graded line, enclosed within a tunnel for almost its entire length was known locally as the Fiery Jack.

By this time the railway operating company had become the Manchester, Sheffield and Lincolnshire Railway, which in 1899 became the Great Central Railway. From 1851 Bridgehouses became the company's terminal for goods and cattle traffic. It remained open for freight until 1965.

The station was approached by a ramp from Nursery Street and on the opposite corner a public house was built. Originally named "The Manchester Railway Hotel" its frontage was damaged in the Sheffield Flood of 1864 and was rebuilt (look at the alignment to the main building). It was renamed "The Manchester Hotel" and in spring 2006, after a short period of closure, it became "The Harlequin", taking the name from a recently demolished pub which stood a short distance away in Johnson Street.

Part of the station site is now used as a car park and part of the retaining wall along Nursery Street has been demolished to make way for the northern section of Sheffield's Inner Ring Road. It has been suggested that this retaining wall might have contained stones from Sheffield Castle.

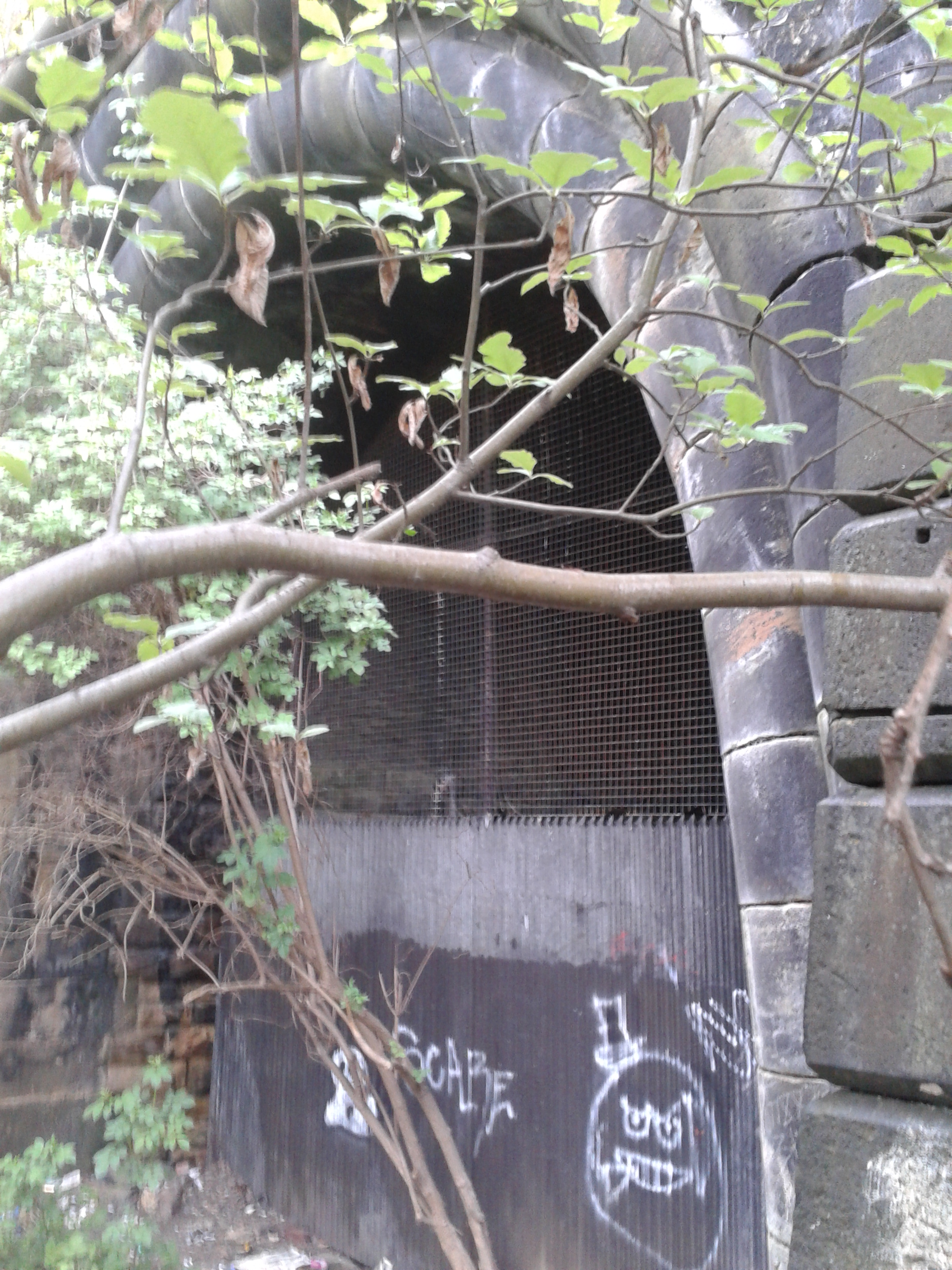
West portal of Bridgehouses Tunnel, which lay east of the station

Before the building of the "Borough Bridge", which carries Corporation Street across the River Don to reach Nursery Street, passenger access to the station from the city area was by a footbridge, depicted by an unknown artist, c. 1840. On the night of 11 March 1864, when the waters of the Great Sheffield flood poured over the bridge, a vast quantity of timber and debris came down with the force of a battering ram, and carried the footbridge away. A successor to this bridge is still standing adjacent to the new bridge which carries the Inner Ring Road over the River Don, although it is in need of restoration.

The terminal was the subject of a BBC local television documentary "Engines must not enter the potato siding" which contained vintage film and memories from former railway workers and which was broadcast in November 1969 at the time of the rationalisation of goods traffic in the Sheffield area and the opening of the new Sheffield Freight Terminal in Brightside Lane. This was adjacent to the site of the former Midland Railway locomotive sheds and yard. The potato siding was situated high above the road and had a wooden floor, fine for wagons and vans but as the title says, not locomotives.

== The last mystery ==
The building of the Sheffield Inner Ring Road (Derek Dooley Way) through the site took away the last remains of the yard but left one mystery, the unsolved murder of Sheffield prostitute Michaela Hague. She was working in the area on 5 November 2001 when she picked up a customer in a car and went to the Bridgehouses station site. She was killed in a frenzied knife attack and although found by police alive, she died later in hospital.

Preceding station	Disused railways	Following station
Neepsend	British Railways; Great Central Main Line	Sheffield Victoria
