= Wortley railway station =

Disused railway station in South Yorkshire, England

Wortley
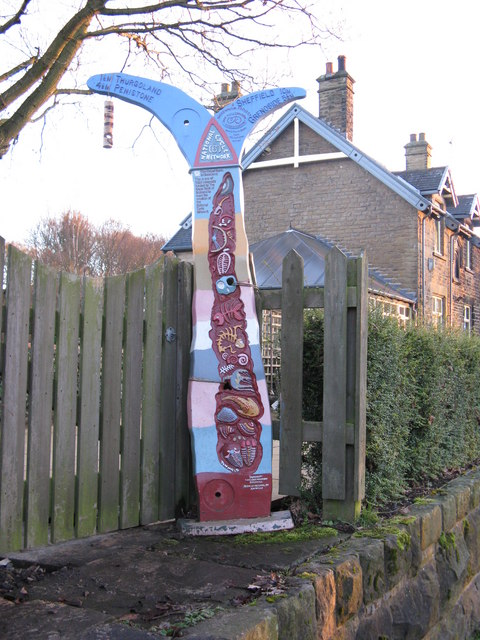
- Mileage marker

General information
- Location: Wortley, Barnsley; England
- Coordinates: 53.488770°N 1.551530°W
- Grid reference: SK298992
- Platforms: 2

Other information
- Status: Disused

History
- Original company: Sheffield, Ashton-under-Lyne and Manchester Railway
- Pre-grouping: Great Central Railway
- Post-grouping: London and North Eastern Railway

Key dates
- 1845: opened
- 1955: closed
Location

Wortley railway station was a railway station on the Sheffield, Ashton-under-Lyne and Manchester Railway lying between Deepcar and Penistone. It was built to serve the village of Wortley, in Barnsley, South Yorkshire, England. Wortley Hall, near the village, was the home of the Earl of Wharncliffe, long time associated with railway development in the area.

The station was similar to the others which opened with the line, with flanking platforms, slightly askew and linked by a footbridge, and a main, stone-built structure with canopy, on the Sheffield-bound platform. Because of its proximity to Wortley Hall the station had a private waiting room for the use of the Earl of Wharncliffe, his family and visitors.

The station, opened on 14 July 1845, was closed on 2 May 1955.

Preceding station	Disused railways	Following station
Thurgoland	British Railways; Great Central Main Line	Deepcar
