= Sheffield Victoria railway station =

Disused railway station in South Yorkshire, England

Sheffield Victoria
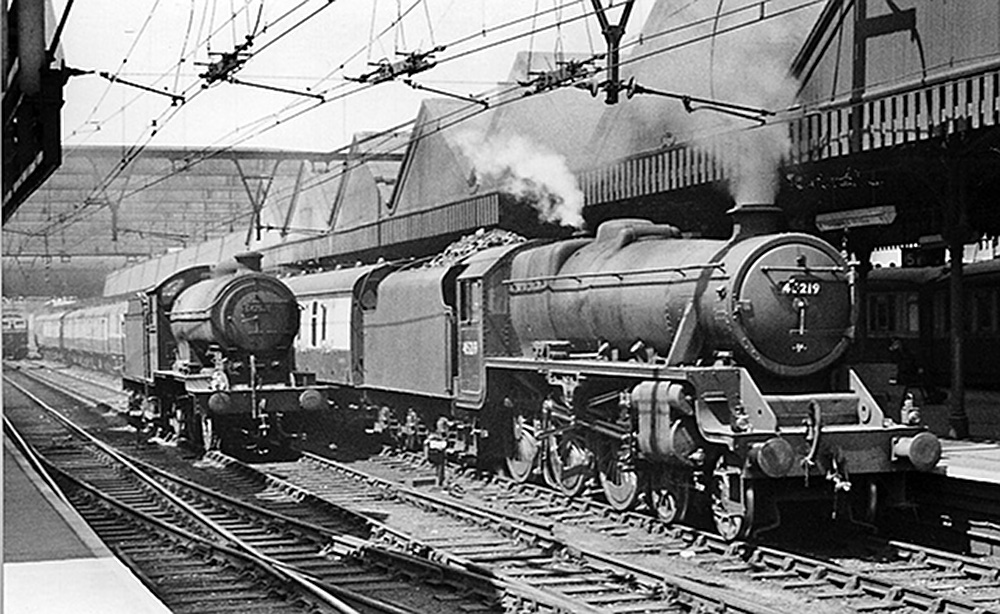
- Sheffield Victoria, as seen in 1957

General information
- Location: Wicker, Sheffield, City of Sheffield, England
- Coordinates: 53.387470°N 1.458760°W
- Grid reference: SK362880
- Platforms: 5

Other information
- Status: Disused

History
- Pre-grouping: Manchester, Sheffield and Lincolnshire Railway, Great Central Railway
- Post-grouping: London and North Eastern Railway, London Midland Region of British Railways

Key dates
- 15 September 1851: Opened
- 5 January 1970: Closed
Location

Sheffield Victoria was one of the main railway stations in Sheffield, South Yorkshire, England, until 1970; it was a principal stop on the Great Central Railway.

== History ==
=== Early history ===
Engineered by Joseph Locke, the Sheffield, Ashton-under-Lyne and Manchester Railway linking Manchester and Sheffield opened in 1845. Originally, this line terminated at the Bridgehouses station, which was about 0.7 miles (1 km) to the west of the future Victoria station. In 1847, the Sheffield, Ashton-under-Lyne and Manchester Railway merged with two other railway companies to form the Manchester, Sheffield and Lincolnshire Railway. The station at Bridgehouses had been outgrown, so an extension and new station were planned. John Fowler, who later gained fame for co-designing the Forth Railway Bridge in Scotland, was employed to engineer the extension and station. Fowler's design included a viaduct over the Wicker that was 40 feet (12 m) high, 750 yards (690 m) long and two island platforms 1,000 ft (300 m) long. The extension was completed in 1847–1848 and the new Victoria station opened on 15 September 1851.

A description of the station just before it opened appeared in the Sheffield Independent on 13 September 1851:

The station is approached from Blonk street by a straight incline, built upon arches, which is 50 feet (15 m) wide, 320 yards (290 m) long and rises at the rate of 1 in 30…the station consists of a centre and wings, the latter being extended by a high fence wall, with gateways for the exit of arrived passengers and, beyond these, on each side, is covered stands for cabs. The length of the frontage of masonry is 400 feet (120 m). The station is built of rock-faced Greenmoor stone, with chiselled beds and joints, and facings of ashlar stone from Wadsley; and distinguished as this line is for the excellence of its masonry, the front of this station is admired by those who are judges of such work, as surpassing in excellence any previous specimen. A covered verandah, with glazed roof supported by iron brackets, extends the whole length of the centre building, in order that carriages may set down passengers under cover. The entrance or waiting hall is 50 feet (15 m) by 30 feet (9.1 m), and 25 feet (7.6 m) high, having an enclosed office for the booking clerks. The entrances are very spacious and convenient, and good arrangements are made to prevent undue pressure. Tickets will be issued at three windows. At the centre, first class passengers of the Manchester, Sheffield and Lincolnshire will get their tickets. On the right hand, the second and third class passengers of the same line will receive tickets. And at the left hand window the Great Northern passengers will take their tickets. The two wings of the building are thus occupied – Eastern wing, refreshment and waiting rooms, conveniences, parcels office, and on the chamber floor the station master’s house. Western wing – telegraph office and station master’s office, rooms for lamps and ports, guards and the engineer’s office. The upper floor will contain board room and other convenient offices.

Having passed through the booking office and reached the platform, the passenger will see before him a most ample, light and conveniently arranged station. It is covered by a light roof of iron and glass of the width of 83 feet (25 m) and of the length of 400 feet (120 m). Here is recognised at a glance one of the first fruits of The Crystal Palace. This roof is the work of Messrs. Fox, Henderson and Co. It is the ridge and furrow roof, with Paxton gutters, which is so constructed as to receive and carry away not only the wet which may fall upon the roof, but the vapour condensed to water, which may at any time be found underneath. The centre of the roof throughout its length is raised so as to permit a line of ventilation. The roof is not sustained by any pillars, but its principals 25 feet (7.6 m) apart, rest on the inner wall of the station buildings on one side, and an equally lofty wall on the other side. The glass of the roof is strong crown glass about the thickness of ordinary pottery. Its area is of the measurement of 34,600 superficial square feet…The platform is of the breadth of 40 feet (12 m) and is about 1,000 feet (300 m) in length. Through the covered station run four lines of rails, while from the end of the station another line runs into a dock in the platform for the stopping and starting of the short east and west trains….The goods trains will not pass through the station at all. Two lines of rails are provided for them outside the north-eastern wall of the station and they will run past without coming at all in the way of the passenger traffic…The immense quantity of water that will be collected by the large roof will be made available for the water closets and urinals. The latter will be constructed of Minton’s white encaustic tiles, and will be open to the roof…The refreshment rooms have been taken at a handsome rent by Mr. Moyes, the spirited landlord of the Great Northern Hotel, at Lincoln…It has been constructed under the direction of John Fowler, Esq., engineer-in-chief of the company, who has been ably represented by Mr. King, the resident engineer; Messrs. Weightman, Hadfield and Goldie…being the architects. The arches upon which the station rests were built by Messrs. Miller, Blackie, and Shortridge. The approaches to the station, the platform, and the completion of the viaduct are the work of Messrs. J. and A. Ridal; and the station has been erected by Mr. Carlisle, the builder of the Beighton viaduct and the new Market Hall.

The station roof likened at the time to The Crystal Palace (in London) which spanned the main line platforms in 1867 and was further enlarged in 1874; the well-known railway contractors Logan and Hemingway were awarded the contract.

With the opening of the London Extension in 1899, Sheffield gained a new direct service to London. To attract the lucrative trade between the cities, the Great Central Railway launched Sheffield Without A Stop on 1 July 1903 and became something of a trademark for the company, with 163.75 miles (263.53 km) being run in exactly 3 hours, an average of nearly 55 miles per hour (89 km/h). Slip coaches were provided for passengers for Leicester and Nottingham.

The station received a new frontage in 1908 and was further improved between 1939 and 1940. The station took on great importance when the line through the Pennines, known as the Woodhead Route after the long Woodhead Tunnel on it, was electrified for freight purposes after World War II.

=== Electrification ===
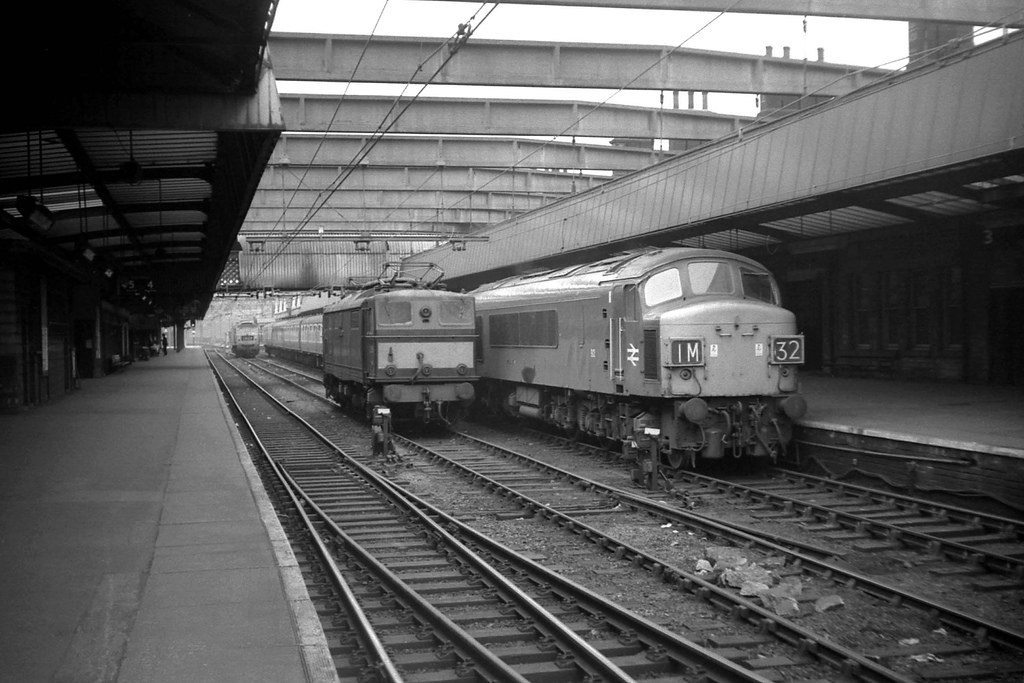
Sheffield Victoria railway station, September 1969, a westbound diesel-hauled train arrives at platform 3, with an electric locomotive waiting to take the train on to Manchester

The 1950s saw the station at its zenith. Regular Manchester London Road – Sheffield Victoria – London Marylebone express services traversed the Great Central line; other expresses ran to London King's Cross over the East Coast Main Line and the named expresses the Master Cutler, the Sheffield Pullman and the South Yorkshireman served the station. There were also many semi-fast trains running trans-Pennine from Manchester to destinations on the East Coast, with local trains to Chesterfield, Barnsley, Nottingham, Doncaster, Retford, Penistone and Lincoln.

The electrification of the line reached Sheffield Victoria by 1954, reducing the journey time to Manchester to 56 minutes. This was the only UK main line to be electrified at 1,500 V DC. From this point onwards, all passenger trains heading to Manchester required a change of locomotive at Victoria to a Class 76 or Class 77.

=== Closure ===
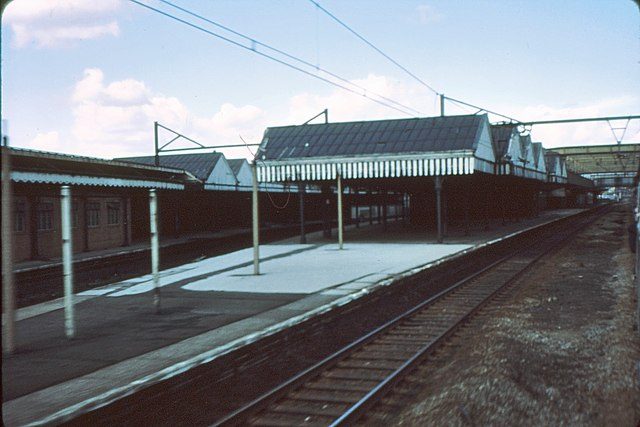
The station after closure in 1971

Although the 1950s saw services at the station reach their peak, this period also marked the beginning of its decline. In 1953, Barnsley was an early casualty as the line ran almost parallel to the former Midland Railway's Sheffield Midland – Barnsley line, serving mostly the same communities. By the end of the decade, the expresses to Marylebone were either cut or re-routed to King's Cross (in the case of the Master Cutler). In the mid-1960s, there was a concerted effort to concentrate Victoria's remaining local and express train services at Sheffield (Midland) station. From 4 October 1965, most services were diverted to Sheffield Midland, adding 2 to 4 minutes to their schedules. The only trains remaining were to Manchester, via Woodhead, the Harwich boat train and trains to Bournemouth, York and Swindon. After September 1966, Victoria was left with just an hourly Manchester service and the daily Liverpool-Harwich "Continental" boat train service.

In 1965, the second Beeching Report recommended that the Sheffield to Manchester service be consolidated; after much local wrangling, British Railways favoured the Hope Valley Line which was slower and not electrified, but served more local communities. In 1967, plans were announced to withdraw passenger services along the Woodhead route. Following public outcry, an inquiry was launched that took two years to be completed. Eventually, the inquiry backed British Rail's plans and passenger services were withdrawn from the line on 5 January 1970. The last train to Victoria station, an enthusiasts' special, arrived at 00:44 on 5 January and, from that point, the station was closed.

Between 20 and 22 January 1973, the station was briefly reopened whilst Sheffield (Midland) station was completely closed for commissioning of the new power signalling box.

The final use of the station by regular fare-paying passengers was unscheduled, and occurred on 17 June 1981, when points failure caused a Huddersfield to Sheffield Midland passenger service to be terminated there.

The Manchester-Sheffield-Wath electric railway was entirely closed east of Hadfield in July 1981; the tracks through the Woodhead Tunnel were lifted in 1986. Passenger trains to and from Huddersfield, via Penistone, continued to pass through the station without stopping until May 1983, when they were diverted via Barnsley (the Penistone via Wadsley Bridge section then being closed to passenger traffic). All of the track through the station was lifted by 1985, except for the now single track goods avoiding line which still exists to serve the steelworks at Stocksbridge, and the station buildings were demolished in 1989 to make way for an extension to the adjacent Victoria Hotel complex. The slope that once led up to platform 1 survives as part of a pedestrian path to the car park.

Preceding station	Disused railways	Following station
Bridgehouses	British Railways; Great Central Main Line	Darnall
Bridgehouses	LNER; Great Central Railway; Manchester, Sheffield Victoria-Doncaster Line	Attercliffe

== Future and potential reopening ==
=== South Yorkshire Supertram ===
Outlines of the platforms still remain and the trackbed has been protected for a possible future extension of the South Yorkshire Supertram. The trackbed may also be used for the proposed Don Valley Railway, which will terminate at Nunnery, linking into the Supertram approximately 1,300 yards (1,200 m) to the east where the proposed DVR will also interchange with train services on the Sheffield to Lincoln Line. As of 2025, these plans are still being considered as part of the future South Yorkshire People's Network, with the potential for tram-trains to run up the former Woodhead line into Stocksbridge town centre.

=== HS2 ===
It was suggested by Sheffield City Council that the site could have been used for Sheffield's HS2 station, instead of the then planned station at Meadowhall; although an alternative route announced in 2016 would see HS2 using the existing Sheffield station, formerly known as Sheffield Midland station.

=== Barrow Hill line ===
In May 2020, as part of the Restoring Your Railway fund by the Department for Transport, it was announced that the Barrow Hill Line had been awarded funding for a feasibility study. If proven to be feasible, the line would initially run to Sheffield Midland but later phases could see services diverted to a reopened Sheffield Victoria – services would run to Chesterfield (via the Barrow Hill Line) and services to Huddersfield (via a reopened Don Valley Line between Penistone and Sheffield) which would help free up capacity at Sheffield Midland for the additional services planned under HS2 and Northern Powerhouse Rail. Later pathing extensions could see a restored Sheffield Victoria, with services running to Lincoln (via Retford), Nottingham (via Chesterfield), Rotherham (via Attercliffe) and Huddersfield (via Penistone).

In October 2021, further funding was given to the reopening of the line to Stocksbridge which would involve the reopening of Sheffield Victoria. If reopened, the line would have at least two trains per hour with potential services extending to Chesterfield, Worksop and Rotherham.

== In popular culture ==
- Sheffield-based industrial music pioneers Cabaret Voltaire filmed the video to their track "Yashar" in the remains of the station in the early-1980s; at one point a Class 20 hauled freight train is seen passing through. The band was noted for the use of decaying urban scenery in its videos.

== See also ==
- Sheffield railway station (formerly Midland Station)
- Sheffield Wicker railway station
