= Meningitis Now =

UK charitable organization

Meningitis Now is a national charity based in the United Kingdom. It was formed following a merger between the charities The Meningitis Trust and Meningitis UK in 2013. Meningitis Now is working towards a future where no one in the UK dies from meningitis and everyone affected gets the support they need.

== History ==
Meningitis Trust was a charity formed in the United Kingdom in 1986 to fight meningitis.

Meningitis UK was originally called the Spencer Dayman Meningitis Laboratories in memory of founder and chief executive Steve Dayman's son, who died of meningitis and meningococcal septicaemia in 1982, aged 14-months. It was established in 1999 to fund a £500,000 dedicated meningitis research laboratory in the School of Medical Sciences at University of Bristol. Once this project was completed, the charity decided to focus solely on funding research into a preventative vaccine for all forms of meningitis.

In 2013, the Meningitis Trust and Meningitis UK merged and the new organisation was renamed Meningitis Now. Medical research is still at the heart of what they do, together with awareness raising and support.

== Patrons ==
Among the charity's patrons are: • Lord Darzi • The Duchess of Edinburgh • Andrew Harvey • Lord Williams of Oystermouth • Ken Loach • Lisa Snowdon • Ian Rush MBE • Joanna Trollope CBE • Denis Law • Joe Swash
