= Sheffield, Ashton-under-Lyne and Manchester Railway =

Overview
- Dates of operation: 1841–1847
- Successor: Manchester, Sheffield and Lincolnshire Railway

Technical
- Track gauge: 4 ft 8 1/2 in (1,435 mm)

The Sheffield, Ashton-under-Lyne and Manchester Railway was an early British railway company which opened in stages between 1841 and 1845 between Sheffield and Manchester via Ashton-under-Lyne. The Peak District formed a formidable barrier, and the line's engineer constructed Woodhead Tunnel, over three miles (4.8 km) long. The company amalgamated with the Sheffield and Lincolnshire Junction Railway and Great Grimsby and Sheffield Junction Railway companies, together forming the Manchester, Sheffield and Lincolnshire Railway in 1847.

In the twentieth century the line carried an exceptionally heavy freight traffic, and it was electrified in 1954; at that time a new Woodhead Tunnel was driven. In 1974 the major part of the route was closed to passenger trains, leaving passenger operation continuing only on the Manchester–Hadfield section, and in 1981 the line east of Hadfield closed completely. The Manchester–Hadfield–Glossop section and a branch to Stalybridge remain in use.

== Origins ==
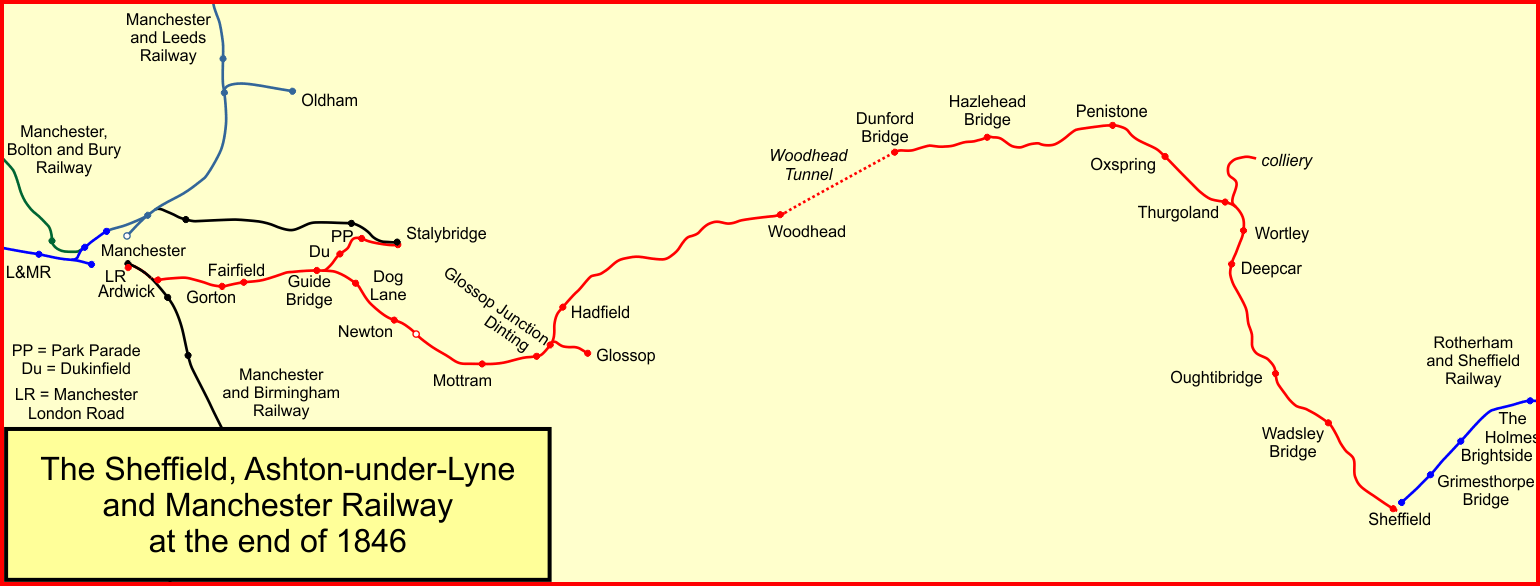
The Sheffield, Ashton-under-Lyne and Manchester Railway on the last day of its independent existence

At the end of the 18th century, the need for improved transport links between Manchester and Sheffield, only 35 miles (56 km) apart but separated by the upland Peak District, was increasing. The canal route involved a long northwards detour through the Pennines, and the journey took eight days.

In 1826 a land surveyor in Sheffield, Henry Sanderson, put forward a line to Manchester via Edale and a prospectus for a "Sheffield and Manchester Railway" was published in August 1830, with George Stephenson appointed to be the engineer.

There were concerns about the severity of the gradients on this line, which would involve rope-worked inclines. He suggested an alternative route, via Penistone, that would involve less tunnelling, and have gentler gradients which could be worked by locomotives, but this scheme too failed to attract support.

In 1835 Charles Vignoles was asked to examine another route, again via Woodhead and Penistone; and a new provisional company, the "Sheffield, Ashton-under-Lyne and Manchester Railway" was formed. This line could be worked by adhesion, and required only a two-mile (3 km) tunnel. Vignoles and Joseph Locke were asked to make independent surveys, and in October met to reconcile any differences, at which time they decided that a longer tunnel at a lower level would reduce the approach gradients involved.

Sheffield, Ashton-under-Lyne and Manchester Railway Act 1837
- Act of Parliament
- Parliament of the United Kingdom
- Long title: An Act for making a Railway from Sheffield in the West Riding of the County of York to Manchester in the County of Lancaster.
- Citation: 7 Will. 4 & 1 Vict. c. xxi

Dates
- Royal assent: 5 May 1837
Other legislation
Repealed by	Manchester, Sheffield and Lincolnshire Railway Act 1849

Status: Repealed

Text of statute as originally enacted

Sheffield, Ashton-under-Lyne and Manchester Railway Act 1842
- Act of Parliament
- Parliament of the United Kingdom
- Long title: An Act to alter and amend some of the Provisions of the Act[e] relating to the Sheffield, Ashton-under-Lyne, and Manchester Railway.
- Citation: 5 & 6 Vict. c. xviii

Dates
- Royal assent: 13 May 1842
Other legislation
Repealed by	Manchester, Sheffield and Lincolnshire Railway Act 1849

Status: Repealed

Text of statute as originally enacted

After parliamentary expenses of £18,000 (equivalent to £1,700,000 in 2025), the line obtained its authorising act of Parliament, the Sheffield, Ashton-under-Lyne and Manchester Railway Act 1837 (7 Will. 4 & 1 Vict. c. xxi) on 5 May 1837. The only opposition came from the Manchester and Birmingham Railway, with whom it was agreed that the line from Ardwick would be shared as it entered a joint station in Manchester at Store Street.

== Construction and first opening ==
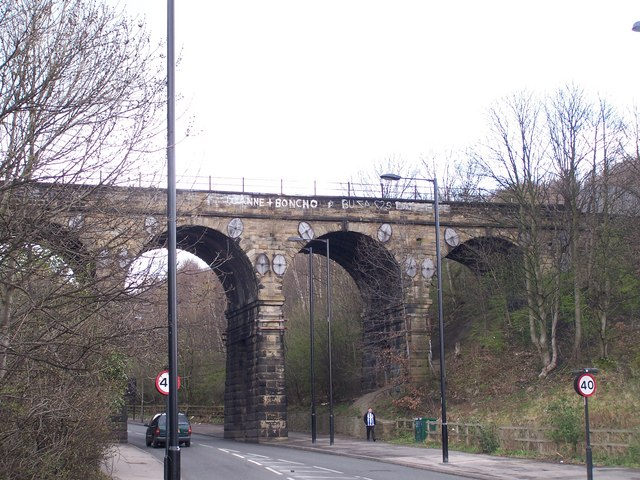
Wardsend Viaduct, Herries Road, Sheffield, built by Joseph Locke in 1845

The first sod was cut near the western end of the Woodhead Tunnel site on 1 October 1838. The following year the line had been marked out, land purchase was proceeding well, and construction had begun with Thomas Brassey as contractor. However a number of shareholders were defaulting on their payments, and there were concerns about the cost of construction. The Woodhead Tunnel would be built as a single-track bore to reduce costs. The relationship between the board and its engineer, Vignoles, was becoming strained, and Vignoles resigned. Joseph Locke agreed to act as engineer in a consultative capacity only, if the board would appoint resident engineers for the day-to-day supervision of the work.

In 1841 Locke reported that construction of the tunnel would probably cost £207,000 (equivalent to £18,570,000 in 2025), about twice the original estimate. Considerable volumes of water were encountered in the headings and more powerful pumps were acquired. In late 1841 the line was ready as far as Godley Toll Bar, a distance of eight miles (13 km), and the directors made an experimental trip over it on 11 November 1841. The Board of Trade inspecting officer, Sir Frederick Smith, passed the line as safe, and it was opened to the public on 17 November 1841. There was no opening ceremony, but each shareholder was sent a free ticket for travel on that day. The Manchester and Birmingham Railway's temporary station at Travis Street, Manchester, was used, pending the readiness of the Store Street terminal. The route was single track throughout as an economy measure, at first without any intermediate passing places. It shared the final approach from Ardwick to Travis Street with the M&BR trains, on the M&BR track. Nearly 40% of gross passenger receipts were payable to the M&BR for the use of the short section of their line. Goods traffic was developed much more slowly.

The arrangements for safe working at the junction seem to have been lax, and the Manchester Guardian observed that

Some caution will be requisite here to prevent two trains... coming into contact at this point. This, of course, may be done by arranging the times, or by keeping the rails separate, which is indeed to be the case when the line is completed to the new Manchester station, but at the present, the proper precaution seems to be to stand a watchman there to keep a look-out on both lines, and see that when a train is arriving on one line, there is no train arriving on the other, or if there be, to make the signal to one of them to slacken speed.

Permanent way maintenance was put to contract.

== Completion of the line, and a cancelled alliance ==
The M&BR and SA&MR opened the jointly owned Store Street station in Manchester on 10 May 1842. The initial opening of a single line only proved impossibly constraining, and installation of double track was ordered early in 1842, together with construction on from Godley to Glossop. The line from Godley to Broadbottom was opened on 10 December 1842, (Note: Godley Toll Bar station was then closed.) and on to a "Glossop" station, later to be renamed Dinting, on 24 December 1842. There were six daily trains to Glossop supplemented by four to Newton & Hyde station. There were four to Glossop on Sundays. By November 1842 the stations were Manchester (Store Street), Ardwick, Gorton, Fairfield, Ashton, Dukinfield, Newton & Hyde, Broadbottom and Glossop. The Dukinfield station (called Dog Lane) was closed in 1845; another station, named simply Dog Lane was opened nearby in 1846, closing in 1847. There was also a Dukinfield station on the Stalybridge branch.

The main line was opened as far as Woodhead in 1844, with stations at Hadfield and Woodhead. Construction of Woodhead Tunnel was the next hurdle, but improved pumping machinery had been installed, enabling better progress.

Alliances and extensions of the network were in the minds of the directors. Encouragement was offered to a proposed Sheffield and Lincolnshire Junction Railway, to run from the SA&MR at Sheffield to Gainsborough. At the same time (1844) friendly relations with the Manchester and Birmingham Railway were further developed, and at length this led to a proposal by the M&BR with the Midland Railway to lease the SA&MR, giving those companies better access to Manchester. This seemed to be going well, and an authorising Act was passed, but the proposal was voted down in May 1845 by shareholders, who were persuaded that their line would be merely a remote satellite of the Midland Railway.

A branch line was being built from Ashton to Stalybridge. However disaster took place: on 19 April 1845 a nine-arch viaduct under construction collapsed: 17 workmen were killed.

On 9 June 1845 a short single line branch to Glossop was opened; powers were obtained in the 1846 parliamentary session to take it over from the Duke of Norfolk, who had caused it to be built. The branch joined the main line facing Manchester some distance to the east of the original Glossop station, now renamed Dinting.

The (unconnected) eastern section of the main line was opened on 14 July 1845; there were stations at Dunford Bridge, Penistone, Wortley, Deepcar, Oughty Bridge, Wadsley Bridge and a Sheffield station at Bridgehouses.

Finally on 22 December 1845 Woodhead Tunnel was ready and a ceremonial opening of the entire line, including the Stalybridge branch, took place; the following day it opened to the general public. The tunnel was at the time the longest in the country, at 3 miles 22 yards (4.848 km). Two extra stations were added at the site of previous coal sidings at Oxspring and at Thurgoland.

Besides Woodhead, there were short tunnels at Audenshaw Road, Hattersley (two), Thurgoland and Bridgehouses. Among the bridges the two most notable were the Etherow Viaduct and the Dinting Viaduct, the latter with five central and eleven approach arches.

The completed network consisted of 40 miles (64 km) of main line, 2 1/4 miles (3.6 km) on the Stalybridge branch and one mile (1.6 km) on the Glossop branch.

== 1845: Expansion ==
The state of the money market considerably improved in 1844–45, and the Railway Mania took hold. The directors of the SA&MR saw that expansion was the way forward for the company. On 15 April 1845 a shareholders' meeting approved the submission of bills for the Manchester South Junction and Altrincham Railway, which would connect the line to the Liverpool and Manchester Railway, and the Barnsley Junction Railway, which would run from near Penistone to Barnsley and connect with the North Midland Railway at Royston. The Sheffield and Lincolnshire Junction Railway, from Sheffield to Gainsborough, was already approved. Supplementing this list were proposals for lines from Wortley through Thorncliffe to Chapeltown, and from Dukinfield to New Mills and on to a junction with the Buxton line of the Manchester and Birmingham Railway. The Barnsley Junction Railway might be extended to Pontefract, and exploratory meetings were opened with the promoters of a Boston, Newark and Sheffield Railway, and of a Hull and Barnsley Junction Railway. Not all of these lines were later authorised.

Of greatest significance was a meeting on 5 September 1845 between the SA&MR, the promoters of the Sheffield and Lincolnshire Junction Railway, and the Great Grimsby and Sheffield Junction Railway; the Grimsby Docks Company was included. The outcome was agreement to amalgamate the three concerns, forming a single railway connecting Manchester to Grimsby on the North Sea coast. The idea was developed and approved by Parliament on 27 July 1846, to be effective on 1 January 1847. The combined company would be named the Manchester, Sheffield and Lincolnshire Railway.

== Part of the Manchester, Sheffield and Lincolnshire Railway ==
On the first day of existence of the new company, a 1/2-mile (0.80 km) connecting line from Bridgehouses station to the Sheffield station of the Midland Railway. It had originally been opened as the terminus of the Sheffield and Rotherham Railway; it was known as Sheffield Wicker station from 1852. The short steeply graded line was enclosed within a tunnel for almost its entire length, and was known locally as the Fiery Jack. It was used for wagon transfer purposes.

The through line required a better Sheffield station: a station was built, and opened on 15 September 1851, and named Victoria station.

An express passenger train service was run from Manchester to London, from 1857, in association with the Great Northern Railway. A timing of 5 hours 20 minutes was operated, the same time as on the rival London and North Western Railway (successor of the Manchester & Birmingham Railway), although that company soon accelerated its services to a speed that the MS&LR and GNR service could not match. For a time there was bitter hostility from the LNWR with some underhand tactics employed by it to discourage use of the rival service.

== Woodhead Tunnel ==
There were a number of viaducts on the original line, although few survived into the 20th century in their original form. The principal engineering feature was Woodhead Tunnel. At 3 miles 22 yards (4.848 km) in length it was the longest tunnel in the United Kingdom when built, and still the longest on the LNER system in 1947. It was originally planned to build a double-track tunnel, but to economise a single-track bore was made. The track rose at 1 in 201 towards the east.

No less than 157 tons of gunpowder were used for blasting and eight million tons of water were pumped out, whilst the total quantity of excavation was 272,685 cubic yards (208,483 m^{3}), about half of this being drawn up the shafts. It was completed at a cost in the region of £200,000. The formal opening of the Woodhead tunnel and of the whole line between Manchester and Sheffield took place on 22 December 1845, more than seven years after the first ground had been broken.

Special precautions were taken to ensure against accidents during operation through the tunnel. An SA&MR pilot engine was stationed at the tunnel and attached to the front of every train that passed through. On the front of the engine was fixed an argand lamp, with a large polished metal disc for reflection, so that a powerful beam of light was thrown forward on the track ahead. A contemporary newspaper account also stated that "Cooke & Wheatstone's patent magnetic telegraph was being fixed in the tunnel with an index, etc., at the stations at each end, capable of being worked by the station clerks."

The single line through the Woodhead tunnel soon proved to be an acute bottleneck and in 1847 (after the formation of the Manchester, Sheffield and Lincolnshire Railway) work upon a second bore was begun. This new tunnel, which was to accommodate the up road (towards Manchester), was driven alongside the original one, it opened on 2 February 1852.

== After the Manchester, Sheffield and Lincolnshire ==
The Manchester, Sheffield and Lincolnshire Railway was renamed the Great Central Railway on 1 August 1897.

In 1923 most of the main line railways of Great Britain were "grouped" in to one or other of four new large companies. The Great Central Railway was a constituent of the new London and North Eastern Railway.

In 1936 the LNER approved a scheme for electrifying the whole line from Manchester via Sheffield to Darnall, together with the branches from Guide Bridge to Ashton-under-Lyne, from Dinting to Glossop and from Penistone to Wombwell and Wath upon Dearne – a total of 74 miles (119 km). The system chosen was 1,500 V DC with overhead wires. All freight as well as passenger traffic was to be hauled by electric traction. For many years about 80 trains travelled through the tunnel each way, each day, of which 90% were loaded or empty coal workings and ventilation was a major problem. The decision to electrify was made as much to increase line capacity as any other consideration. Electrification work was well in hand before the advent of war in 1939 stopped it. In 1946–47 each bore of Woodhead Tunnel in turn was closed for 9 months for major repairs. However, following the nationalisation of railways in 1948, it was decided to close them permanently and bore a new double-track tunnel alongside, with enough clearance for the overhead electrification catenary. The new tunnel was 3 miles 66 yards (4.888 km) long. It was opened by the Minister of Transport on 3 June 1954. The two old tunnels were later sealed off, and they were later purchased by the Central Electricity Generating Board to carry power cables through the Pennines.

On 5 January 1970 the passenger service between Manchester Piccadilly and Sheffield Victoria over the Woodhead route was withdrawn; the electric commuter service from Manchester to Glossop and Hadfield continued in operation. Freight trains were withdrawn on the Woodhead route on 18 July 1981 and the line between Hadfield and Penistone was then closed completely. The line between Penistone and Sheffield remained in use by diesel Sheffield–Huddersfield trains, but with all intermediate stations including Sheffield Victoria having closed, trains had to reverse at Nunnery Junction to enter Sheffield Midland station. On 13 May 1983 these trains were diverted via Barnsley and the ex-Midland route; the track between Penistone and Deepcar was lifted, however the line from Deepcar to Nunnery Junction remains, single track, to serve the Fox steelworks.

On 10 December 1984, Manchester to Glossop and Hadfield electric trains started running at 25 kV AC (the same system as used on the West Coast Main Line which it adjoined) following conversion from the old 1500 V DC system. The system continues in use at the present day. The Stalybridge branch remains in use by local and express trains from Manchester Piccadilly to Huddersfield and Leeds.

== Station list ==
=== Main line ===
- Manchester Store Street (or "Bank Top"); opened jointly with the Manchester and Birmingham Railway 10 May 1842; named Manchester London Road from 1844; renamed Manchester Piccadilly 12 September 1960; still open;
- Travis Street; temporary terminus opened by the M&BR 4 June 1840; served by SA&MR trains from 17 November 1841; closed 10 May 1842;
- Ardwick; opened 20 November 1842; still open;
- Ashburys; opened July 1855; still open;
- Gorton; opened 23 May 1842; still open;
- Fairfield; opened 17 November 1841; re-sited to the east 2 May 1892; still open;
- Ashton & Hooley Hill; opened 17 November 1841; renamed Guide Bridge 1845; still open;
- Dukinfield (Dog Lane); opened 17 November 1841; closed 23 December 1845; reopened nearby as Dog Lane 1 May 1846; closed 1 November 1847;
- (Flowery Field; opened 13 May 1985; still open;)
- Newton; opened 17 November 1841; Newton for Hyde from 1848; still open;
- Godley Toll Bar; opened 17 November 1841 as temporary terminus; closed 11 December 1842;
- (Godley; opened 7 July 1986; still open;)
- Godley Junction; opened 1 February 1866; renamed Godley 6 May 1974; renamed Godley East 7 July 1986; closed after last train on 27 May 1995;
- (Hattersley; opened 1978; still open;)
- Broadbottom; opened 11 December 1842; renamed Mottram 1845; Mottram & Broadbottom 1 July 1884; Broadbottom for Charlesworth 1 January 1954; Broadbottom 1955; still open;
- Glossop; opened 25 December 1842; renamed Dinting 9 June 1845; closed 1 February 1847; see next;
- Glossop Junction; opened 9 June 1845; renamed Dinting February 1847; renamed Glossop & Dinting 10 July 1922; renamed Dinting 26 September 1938; still open;
- Hadfield; opened 8 August 1844; renamed Hadfield & Tintwistle between 1862–63 and 1880–81; Hadfield for Hollingworth 12 October 1903; Hadfield from 1955;
- Crowden; opened 1 July 1861; closed 4 February 1957;
- Woodhead; opened 8 August 1844; closed 27 July 1964;
- Dunford Bridge; opened 14 July 1845; closed 5 January 1970;
- Hazlehead Bridge; opened 1 May 1846; closed 1 November 1847; reopened January 1849; closed 6 March 1950;
- Penistone; opened 14 July 1845; relocated at junction with the L&YR 1 February 1874; still open;
- Oxspring; opened 5 December 1845; closed 1 November 1847;
- Thurgoland; probably opened soon after 5 December 1845; closed 1 November 1847;
- Wortley; opened 14 July 1845; closed 2 May 1955;
- Deepcar; opened 14 July 1845; closed 15 June 1959;
- Oughtibridge or Oughty Bridge opened 14 July 1845; closed 15 June 1959;
- Wadsley Bridge; opened 14 July 1845; closed 15 June 1959;
- Neepsend; opened 1 July 1888; closed 28 October 1940;
- Sheffield (Bridgehouses); opened 14 July 1845; closed 15 September 1851 (when Sheffield Victoria station was opened by the amalgamated MS&LR).

=== Stalybridge branch ===
- Guide Bridge (as above);
- Dukinfield; opened 23 December 1845; resited to south west March 1863; renamed Dukinfield Central 1954; closed 4 May 1959;
- Park Parade or Ashton Park Parade; opened 23 December 1845; closed 5 November 1956;
- Stalybridge; opened 23 December 1845; junction with LNWR from 1848; still open.

=== Glossop branch ===
- Dinting (as above);
- Glossop; opened 1 July 1845; renamed Glossop Central 10 July 1922; renamed Glossop 6 May 1974; still open.

== Chief officers ==
=== Chairman ===
- James Stuart-Wortley, 1st Baron Wharncliffe 1837–1840
- John Parker MP 1840–1846
- John Chapman 1846

=== Deputy Chairman ===
- William Sidebottom 1837–1843
- John Chapman 1843–1846 (then Chairman)

=== Secretary ===
- Thomas Asline Ward 1837–1838
- Charles Thompson 1838–1841
- John Platford 1841–1845
- James Meadows 1846

=== Engineer-in-Chief ===
- Charles Blacker Vignoles 1838–1839
- Joseph Locke 1840–1846
- Alfred Stanistreet Lee 1846

=== Resident Engineer ===
- Alfred Stanistreet Lee 1840–1846
- John Bass 1846
