= Dukinfield Dog Lane railway station =

Former railway station in Greater Manchester, England

Dukinfield Dog Lane

General information
- Location: Dukinfield, Greater Manchester; England
- Platforms: 2

Other information
- Status: Disused

History
- Original company: Sheffield, Ashton-under-Lyne and Manchester Railway

Key dates
- 17 November 1841: Opened
- 23 December 1845: Closed
- 1 May 1846: Reopened as "Dog Lane"
- 1 November 1847: final closure

Dukinfield Dog Lane railway station was a short-lived station on the Woodhead Route between Manchester, Glossop and Penistone. The station served the town of Dukinfield in Tameside, Greater Manchester, England. The station was located off Dog Lane. The line remains in use between Manchester, Glossop and Hadfield. There is no trace left of the old station.

Preceding station	Disused railways	Following station
Guide Bridge; Line and station open	Woodhead Route; London Extension	Newton for Hyde; Line open and station open
