= Penistone railway station =

Railway station in South Yorkshire, England

Penistone
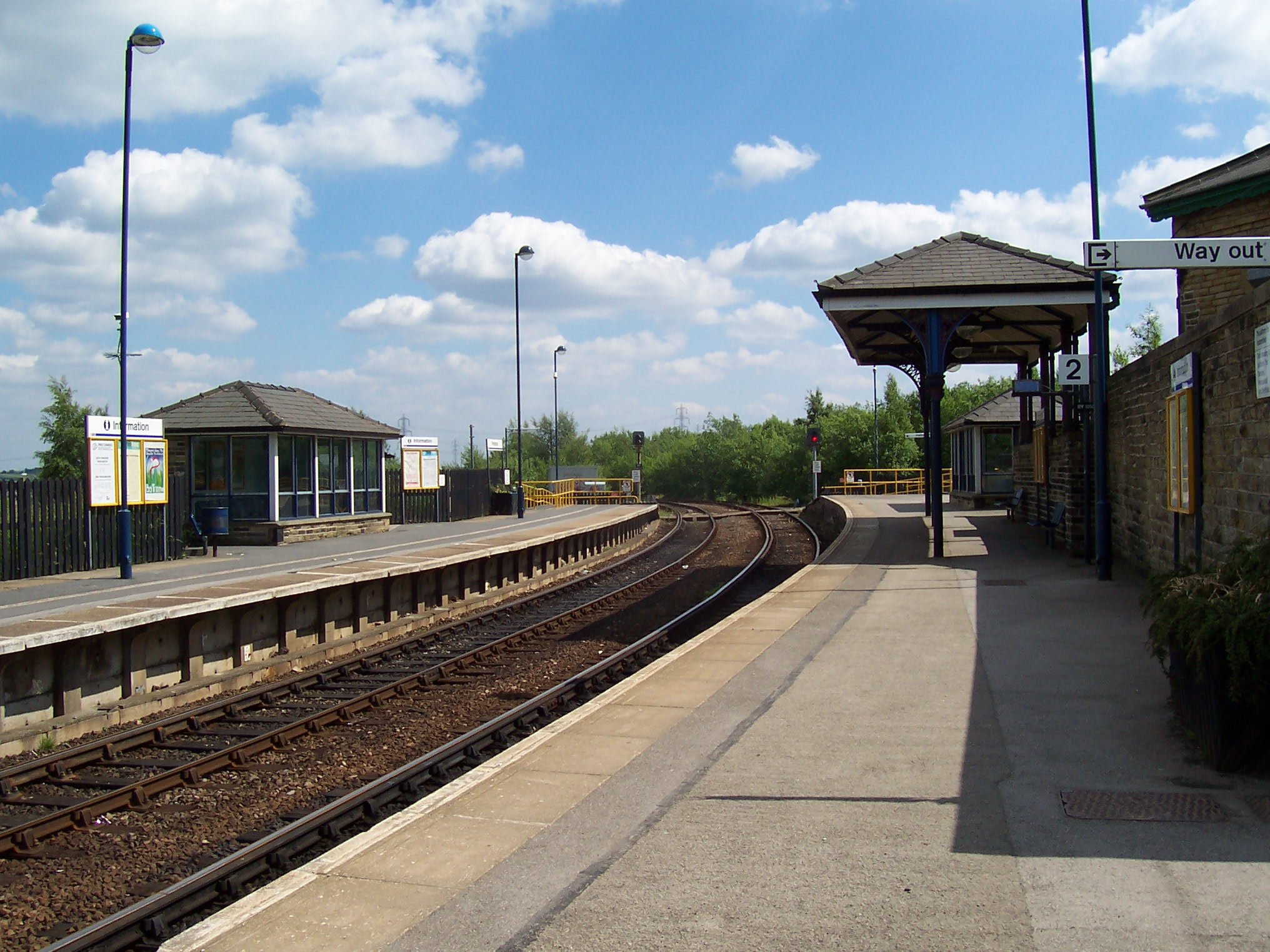

General information
- Location: Penistone, Barnsley; England
- Coordinates: 53.526°N 1.623°W
- Grid reference: SE250033
- Manager: Northern Trains
- Transit authority: South Yorkshire Passenger Transport Executive
- Platforms: 2

Other information
- Station code: PNS
- Fare zone: Barnsley
- Classification: DfT category F1

History
- Opened: 1845; 181 years ago
- Original company: Sheffield, Ashton-under-Lyne and Manchester Railway
- Pre-grouping: Great Central Railway
- Post-grouping: London and North Eastern Railway

Key dates
- 1874; 152 years ago: moved to current location
- 1970; 56 years ago: Woodhead line platforms closed

Passengers
- 2020/21: ▼35,110
- 2021/22: ▲0.127 million
- 2022/23: ▲0.142 million
- 2023/24: ▲0.158 million
- 2024/25: ▲0.163 million
Location
Notes
- Passenger statistics from the Office of Rail and Road

Penistone railway station serves the town of Penistone, in the Metropolitan Borough of Barnsley, South Yorkshire, England. The current station, at the junction of the Woodhead Line and Penistone Line, opened in 1874; it replaced a station solely on the Woodhead Line, dating from the line's opening by the Sheffield, Ashton-Under-Lyne and Manchester Railway in 1845. The station currently hosts services between Huddersfield, Barnsley and Sheffield.

== History ==
=== Woodhead Line ===
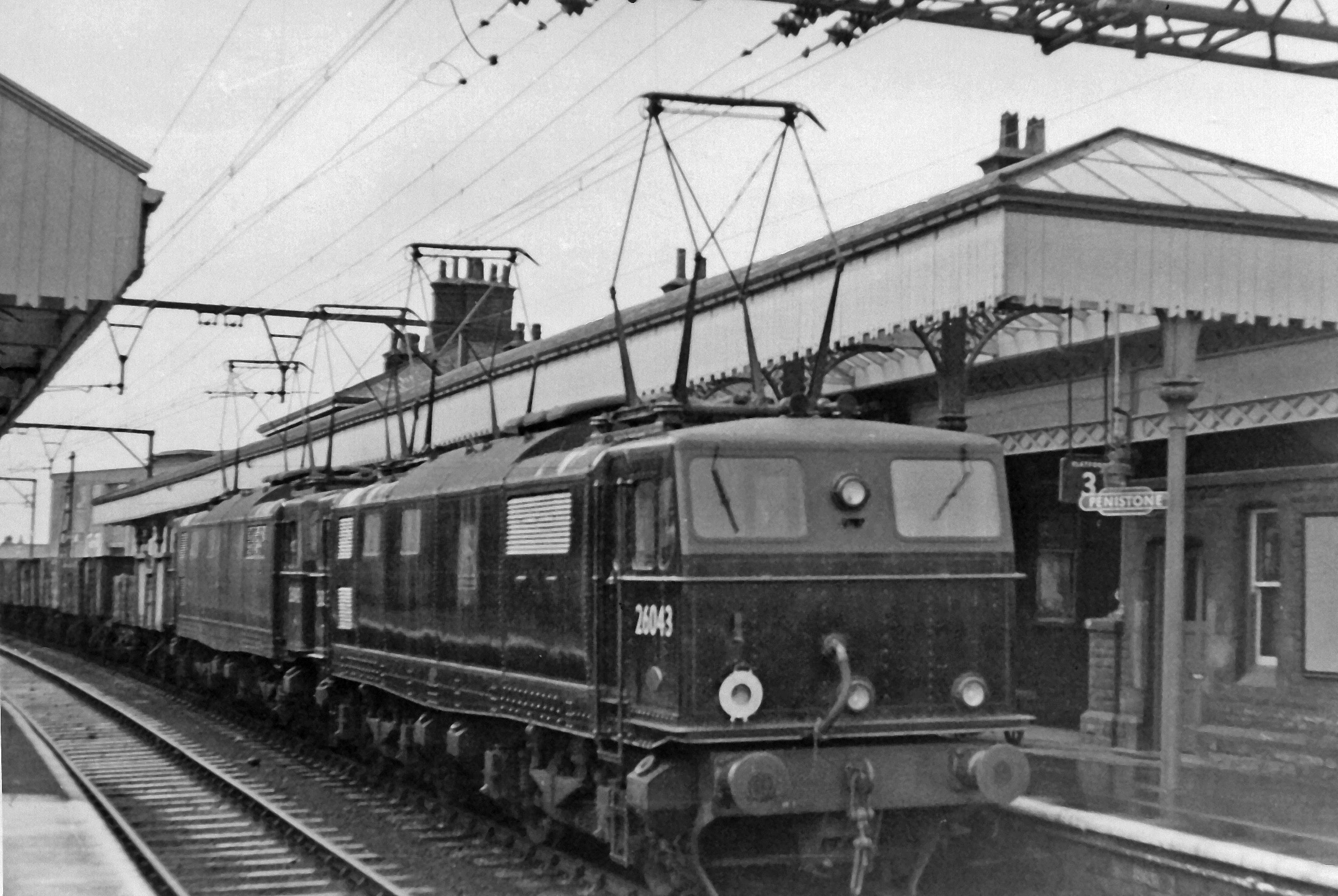
An electric train at the now closed Woodhead Line platforms in 1954

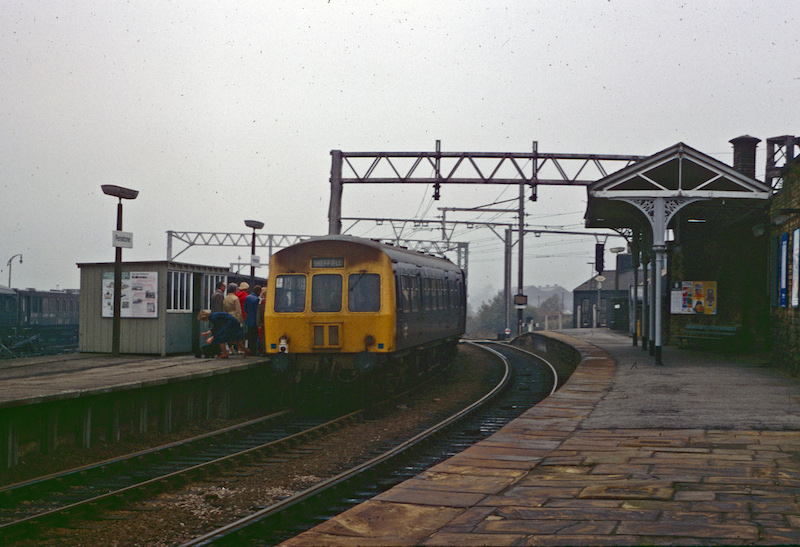
Penistone station in the 1970s

Until 5 January 1970, Penistone station also served passenger trains on the electrified Woodhead Line from Sheffield Victoria to Manchester Piccadilly. Electric trains started in 1954; previously the service was steam-operated.

The line was closed west of Penistone to Hadfield on 18 July 1981; Penistone station was no longer a junction, but the location of the former Woodhead Line platforms is still visible. The electricity supply to the Woodhead Line was controlled from a large building adjacent to Penistone station, which is still standing; it has now been converted for industrial use.

Trains from Huddersfield continued to use the old main line down the Don Valley to Sheffield until May 1983, when they were diverted via Barnsley over the former SYR route. This had been disused for some years, but was refurbished to passenger standards in less than three months once South Yorkshire PTE agreed to continue funding the Penistone end of the route.

=== Doncaster Line ===
Prior to 1959, Penistone was also the terminus of local trains from Doncaster via Barnsley and the Dearne Valley. These trains were timed to connect with Sheffield-Manchester trains at Penistone. This route was opened in 1854.

=== Proposed service to London ===
In 2009, Alliance Rail proposed to run a 4 trains-per-day service between Huddersfield and London Kings Cross, via Worksop, Sheffield and Penistone, which would have given Penistone a direct train service to London 4 times a day.

The station only serves the Penistone Line currently. The line connects Huddersfield with Sheffield, via Barnsley, with an hourly train in each direction. There is a voluntary organisation which supports and promotes community involvement along the line called the Penistone Line Partnership.

Penistone station is the site of one of the two remaining passing loops on the Barnsley to Huddersfield line, allowing trains coming from Sheffield and Huddersfield to pass each other. However, the sections either side of it are each single track – that northwards to Clayton West junction and Shepley having been singled in 1969, whilst that to Barnsley has been so since reopening in 1983. The loop was formerly controlled from the distinctive elevated ex-GCR Huddersfield Junction signal box south of the station until 1998, when control was transferred to the new Barnsley PSB and the box closed (it has since been demolished). Immediately north of the station, the line crosses the Don valley on an imposing 98 ft (30 m) high stone viaduct of 29 arches (one of four such structures on the route).

== Facilities ==
The station is unstaffed but has a ticket machine on the Huddersfield bound side. The main buildings (in the vee between the old Woodhead track bed and the Huddersfield line) still stand, but these are in private commercial use. Waiting rooms are provided on each platform, along with digital display screens, automated announcements and timetable poster boards to offer train running information. Level access is possible to both platforms (via a ramp from the car park), but the National Rail page for the station states that neither platform is accessible for wheelchair users due to the barrow crossing at the south end of the station (which links the platforms) having gaps in its surface.

== Services ==
Northern Trains operates an hourly service in each direction between Huddersfield and Sheffield, via Barnsley.

Preceding station	National Rail	Following station
Silkstone Common	Northern Trains Penistone Line	Denby Dale
	Disused railways	
Denby Dale	L&Y; Penistone Line	Terminus
Hazlehead Bridge	GCR; Woodhead Line	Silkstone Common
Hazlehead Bridge	GCR; Great Central Main Line	Wortley

== Bibliography ==
- Body, G. (1988), PSL Field Guides – Railways of the Eastern Region Volume 2, Patrick Stephens Ltd, Wellingborough, ISBN 1-85260-072-1
