= Manchester–Sheffield–Wath electric railway =

Electrification scheme in northern England

The Manchester–Sheffield–Wath electric railway was an electrification scheme on British railways. The route featured long ascents on both sides of the Pennines with the long Woodhead Tunnel at its central summit close to the Woodhead pass. This led to the route being called the Woodhead Line.

== The route ==
The main route ran from Manchester London Road (later Manchester Piccadilly) over the Pennines, through the Woodhead Tunnel to Penistone, where the Wath line split. The main line then proceeded through Sheffield Victoria Station and on to Rotherwood sidings. The Wath line ran from Penistone to Wath marshalling yard in the heart of the South Yorkshire coalfields.

The line split from the Barnsley–Penistone line at West Silkstone Junction on through the Worsbrough Branch line to Aldham Junction.

Electrified branches off the main line ran to Glossop (for local passenger trains), to the locomotive and EMU depot at Reddish and exchange sidings at Hyde Road on the Fallowfield Loop line, Dewsnap sidings, Ashton Moss sidings, and Tinsley Marshalling Yard.

== Electrification ==
=== Prewar situation and progress ===
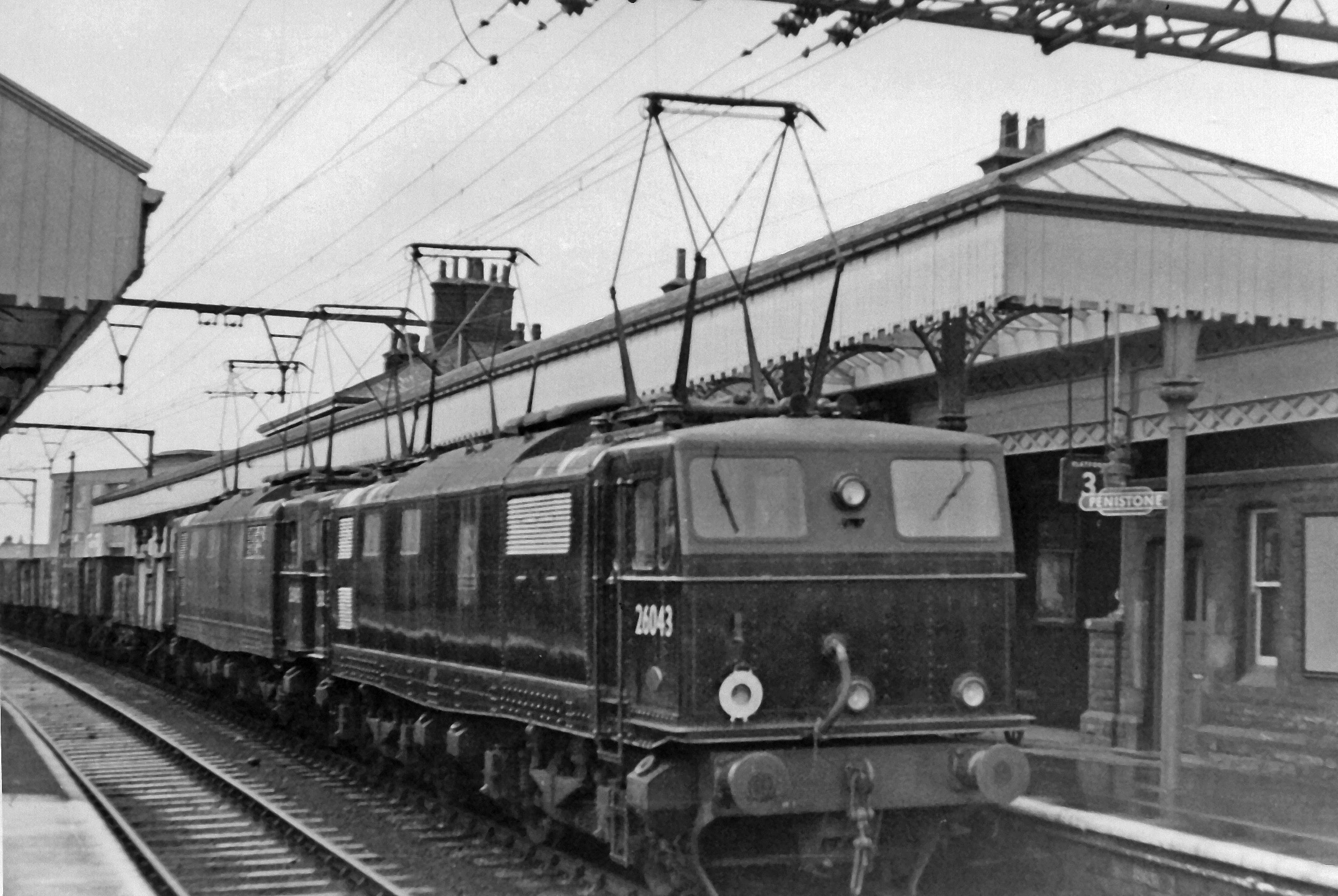
EM1 (Class 76) locomotives at Penistone station in 1954

Following developments with electric traction in the US, the Great Central Railway (GCR) first considered the electrification of the line before the First World War. No detailed plans were drawn up, but by the 1920s the high levels of heavy freight traffic made steam operation increasingly problematic. Plans were interrupted by the 1923 grouping of the railways, which saw the GCR absorbed into the London and North Eastern Railway (LNER).

The operational problems remained into the 1930s. In 1935 the government made credits available to the railways to provide relief for unemployed persons in the Great Depression so the LNER restarted the project: planning and works for electrification commenced. The system was to be electrified at 1,500 V DC, similar to the Dutch style of electrification that had also been used on the LNER's Newport–Shildon line. This system had the advantage that regenerative braking could easily be employed; this provided braking by allowing an electric locomotive's motors to act as generators, thus assisting with control of heavy freight trains when running downhill. The power generated by a descending train's braking was fed back to the overhead lines and either used by other trains requiring power in the same block of line, or dissipated as heat in resistive loads at the electrical sub-stations.

Nearly all of the gantries for the overhead wires between Manchester London Road and the west portal of Woodhead were erected, and a prototype locomotive was constructed, by the time the Second World War intervened. The locomotive was loaned to the Netherlands Railways (NS) immediately after the Second World War to assist in working the war-damaged railways there; in the process of this it acquired the nickname "Tommy" in honour of the British foot soldier. Later, after repatriation to Britain, this nickname was used officially.

=== Postwar: running the wires ===
In 1948 the LNER was nationalised as a part of British Railways. Nearly 30 years had elapsed and the operational problems remained, so money was made available to complete the electrification project. By now the state of the original Woodhead tunnels meant that a new double-track tunnel had to be built to replace the two original single-track bores. Thurgoland tunnel gained a new bore to alleviate clearance problems in the original tunnel. New electric locomotive facilities were built at Reddish, Darnall and Wath, and two classes of locomotive were built at Gorton Locomotive Works, Manchester, for the line: the EM1 (Class 76) Bo+Bo (the + signifying that the bogies were articulated) mixed-traffic locomotives and seven larger EM2 (Class 77) Co-Co locomotives for express passenger trains.

To save on costs, the Cheshire Lines Committee (CLC) loop line into Manchester Central station was not electrified, as was originally in the plan: Manchester-bound passenger trains terminated at London Road (later Piccadilly), while those few passenger trains destined for further afield changed locomotives at Guide Bridge. This was hardly the only austerity measure in the immediate postwar period; other cost-cutting measures in the MSW scheme included retention of signal boxes rather than use of power signalling, and the new Up tunnel at Thurgoland rather than daylighting the original bore.

The Wath to Penistone section was the first to be energised, on 2 February 1952. Completion of the main line was delayed until 1954 by a collapse in the new Woodhead tunnel, and also by the decision to completely re-signal the whole main line with colour-light signals after sighting problems with the semaphore signals on the Wath branch (nevertheless, some semaphores were retained, which generally remained in service until closure). On 30 May 1954 electric trains began running through the tunnel and the Manchester to Penistone section was fully energised on 14 June. The Sheffield Victoria to Penistone section followed on 20 September 1954. At this time the system had its official opening despite not being fully complete: the final few miles from Sheffield Victoria to the system's eastern extremity at Rotherwood was declared open on 3 January 1955.

In 1965 the scheme was extended to the brand-new Tinsley Marshalling Yard in Sheffield. The locomotive facilities at the Sheffield end of the line were moved from Darnall to the new Tinsley depot. The overhead line equipment on this section was designed to be easily convertible to 25 kV AC electrification, which by now had been accepted as the standard overhead electrification system for BR.

=== Benefits and characteristics ===
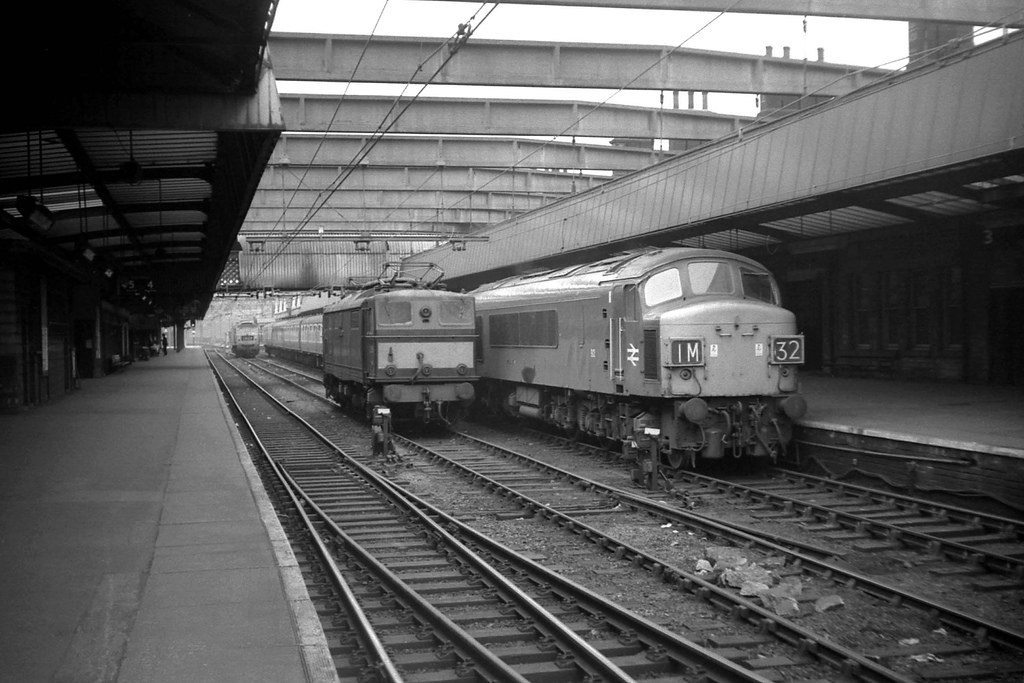
During closure of the Midland line for removal of a tunnel between Chesterfield and Sheffield, trains from St Pancras to Manchester were diverted via the Woodhead Line. In September 1969, a westbound diesel-hauled train arrives at Sheffield Victoria's Platform 3, with an EM1 (Class 76) electric locomotive waiting to take the train forward

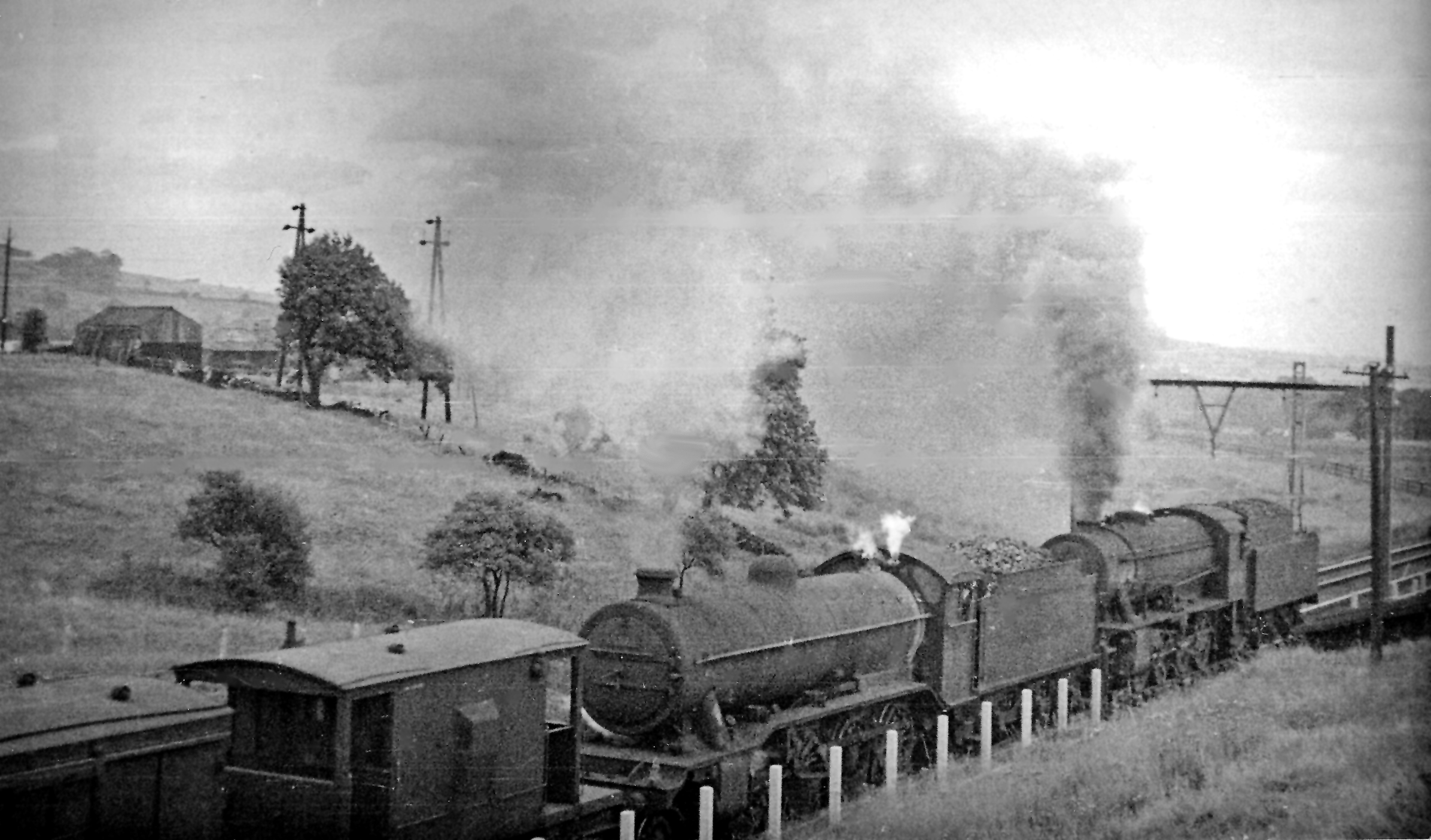
Two 2-8-0s banking a westbound freight up Worsborough Bank towards West Silkstone Junction in August 1950

The benefits of electrification were immediately apparent: Sheffield to Manchester expresses now completed the journey in 56 minutes as opposed to 65 minutes with steam traction; an 850-ton coal train took a mere 66 minutes between Wath and Dunford Bridge as opposed to nearly two and a half hours powered by steam.

The Worsborough (or Wentworth) incline, also known as Worsborough Bank, was a formidable feature on the Wath to Penistone section. This line was opened east of Silkstone in 1880 to alleviate congestion at Barnsley. Although nominally 1 in 40, colliery subsidence had made sections of the bank much steeper. The difficulty in operating this steeply-graded section (which included the two Silkstone tunnels) with steam traction was a key reason for electrification. Before electrification a unique powerful Garratt locomotive was built to act as a banker for this section of line, otherwise the normal mode of operation was for two or sometimes even three bankers for the Worsborough incline plus a pilot locomotive to assist from Wath to Dunford Bridge. Even with five locomotives, heavy trains had slowed to a walking pace by Silkstone. After electrification, much heavier coal trains could be handled up the bank; however problems with unfitted trains running away on the downgrades west of the Pennines restricted weights on such trains.

In later years MGR (Merry-Go-Round) coal trains, running direct from pit to power station became the main traffic with the coal carried in block trains of 30, 32-tonne capacity air-braked wagons. These were normally double-headed by two Class 76 locomotives to their destination with two additional Class 76s banking at the rear from Wombwell to Silkstone. This was the only section of railway in the UK to be regularly operated by four locomotives per train. A "Clearcall" intercom system (via the overhead electric wires) was developed to allow the crews of the front and rear locomotives to communicate, replacing earlier air-horn codes.

The purpose-built power control centre for the line was adjacent to Penistone station. The building still stands, but has been adapted for alternative commercial use.

As much of the line was prone to colliery subsidence, many of the portal structures which supported the overhead wires contained crossbeams which were designed to be easily adjustable upwards or downwards, using permanent way cranes; the ground-level trackside power feed, communications and signalling cables were similarly adjustable.

Some limitations of the Woodhead electrification became apparent, especially with the advent of the double-headed, double-banked merry-go-round unit trains previously mentioned. Whilst such a train was climbing Worsborough Incline, all other electric trains were prohibited from entering or moving within the power section between Strafford Crossing and Aldam Junction, lest the substations at these two locations tripped out from the high current draw. Heavy current loads also caused flashovers in the oil-impregnated paper-insulated lead-covered 33 kV ground-level feeder cable at locations where cable segments were joined together in sealed boxes; such loads were not present in the Manchester, South Junction and Altrincham Railway and Great Eastern 1.5 kV DC schemes, both of which served only electric multiple units, not locomotive-hauled trains.

== Closure ==
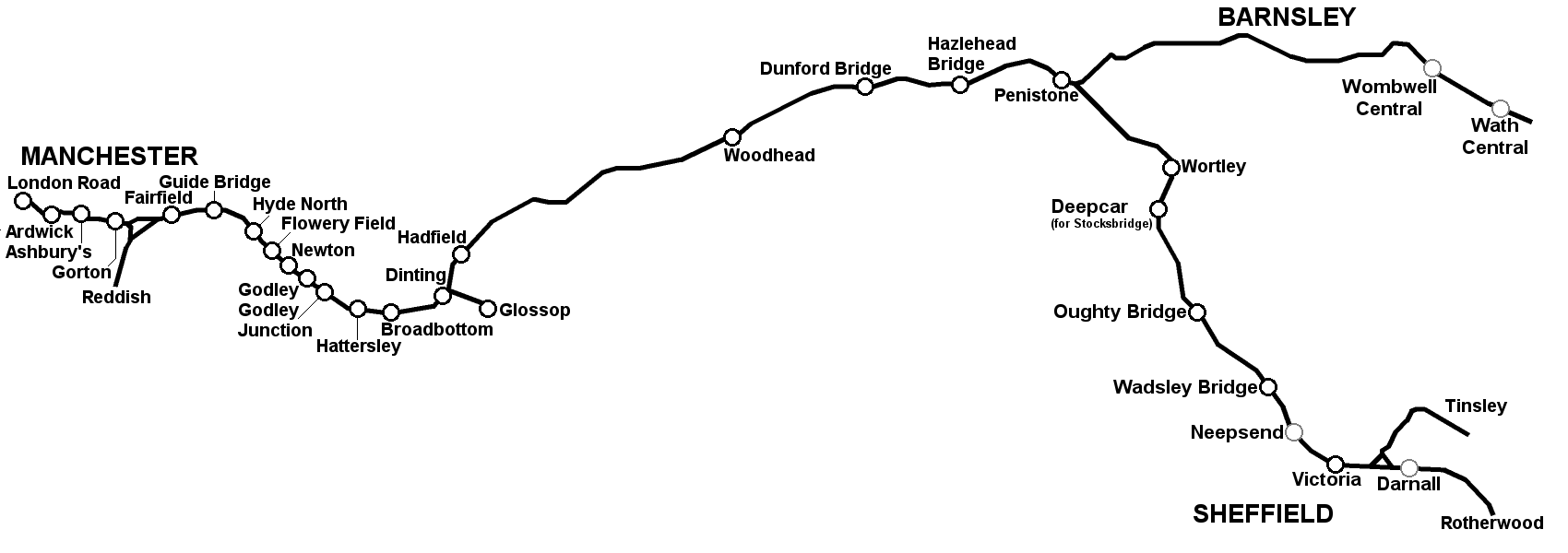
A geographically accurate map of the route.

Electric trans-Pennine passenger services lasted just 16 years. The Beeching Report had specified that only one Manchester–Sheffield route should stay open to passengers and that route would be Woodhead. However local opposition to the closure of the alternative Hope Valley Line, the high cost of providing an electrified link into Sheffield Midland station as Sheffield Victoria was scheduled for closure, and the impending opening of the massive Fiddlers Ferry Power Station requiring even more trans-Pennine freight train paths from the South Yorkshire Coalfield, all conspired against passenger use of the Woodhead line, which closed to passengers on 5 January 1970. A local electric service remained at the Manchester end of the line and the Sheffield–Penistone service was run using diesel trains. The Class 77 express passenger train locomotives were sold to the Netherlands national railway company Nederlandse Spoorwegen, becoming NS Class 1500.

By the late 1970s freight traffic, including South Yorkshire coal, had declined to the extent that British Rail took the decision to close the route, effective 18 July 1981; only the Manchester–Glossop/Hadfield local passenger trains were left running. BR claimed that the cost of replacing the out-of-date and non-standard equipment on the main section of the line was prohibitive. All but one of the remaining Class 76 locomotives were scrapped. The Wath branch was rapidly lifted between Wombwell Main Junction and West Silkstone Junction. As a part of the closure agreement, the track on the Sheffield–Penistone–Hadfield section of the route was left in place for five years. 1986 saw much of the remaining track lifted, except for the sections in the vicinity of Penistone station (which remained open for Sheffield–Huddersfield trains), and east of Deepcar, which remained for both freight and passenger traffic in the Sheffield area.

In December 1984 the remaining equipment at the Manchester end of the line was modified to the standard 25 kV AC, thus ending the use of 1,500 V DC overhead electrification on British Rail. The Class 506 were withdrawn at the same time, being replaced by Class 303 EMUs from the Glasgow area. The line is now operated by Class 323 EMUs.

== See also ==
- Railway electrification in Great Britain
