= Naming of British railway rolling stock =

Since the invention of the very first railway steam locomotive in 1804, railway companies have applied names to their locomotives, carriages and multiple units. Numbers have usually been applied too, but not always; the Great Western Railway only applied names to its own broad gauge locomotives (though numbers were given to such locomotives that it inherited from elsewhere).

Locomotive names have been inspired by a variety of topics over the two centuries of railway operation in the United Kingdom, and the principal themes are set out in the table below, together with some examples of locomotive classes where all or a large proportion carried such names. Two other types of thematic naming of locomotive classes have occurred:

- Each name, though drawn from a variety of different people and things, was strongly connected to the locality through which the owning railway operated. For example the Metropolitan Railway's electric locomotives built in the 1920s carried the names of famous and fictional Londoners of varying types.
- Each name commenced with the same word or letters. For example, British Rail's Class 52 engines each carried a two-word name, the first of which was Western, Foster Yeoman's Class 59 engines similarly had Yeoman as the first word, and the Class 47 engines operated by Rail Express Systems had names commencing with the letters Res.

Theme	Description	Examples
Animals	Hardly an animal type has been passed over as a source of names. Birds, dogs, fish, mammals, molluscs, pre-historic, and fictional animals have all featured. The Great Western Railway had an entire class named after birds, and the London and North Eastern Railway were also fond of birds for their fast express locomotives, given that Sir Nigel Gresley, their principal designer, was a keen ornithologist (note LNER 4468 Mallard, the world's fastest steam locomotive). However, the most unusual animal names applied were those given to the LNER's Class B1 locos; those of varieties of antelope. Springbok and Gnu might not be unusual, but Bongo was more noteworthy! A particular use of this theme was the use of names of fish and other aquatic animals to classify wagons used for maintenance purposes, such as Mackerel (ballast hopper), Dogfish (3-way ballast hopper), and Salmon (track-laying flat wagon with cranes fitted). (See also 'Racehorses'.)	GWR Bulldog Class; LNER Class A4; LNER Class B1
Aristocracy & Politics	Important people like to be flattered, and what better way than to name a locomotive after them. It also gave the railways a bit of grandeur. Hence, locomotives were named after Earls, Lords & Ladies, Prime Ministers and other senior political figures amongst others (see also 'Royalty').	
The Army	Both historic knights and contemporary regiments and their commanders have been honoured by locomotive naming (see also 'Wars & Battles').	LMS Patriot Class; LMS Royal Scot Class; British Rail Class 45; British Rail Class 55; British Rail Class 86
Arthurian Legend		LSWR N15 Class
The Arts	Locomotives have been named after notable actors, artists, composers and singers (see also 'Literature').	BR Class 86 and Class 92; Eurotunnel Class 9
Astronomy	A popular theme with many companies, but especially the Great Western Railway in its early days. Stars suggest regularity and permanence, planets suggest size or strength while comets and other astronomical bodies carry connotations of speed.	GWR first Star and second Star classes
Attractions on Route	Railways have often recognised popular attractions on their route, not least because it might help their business. From geographical attractions (such as Tor Bay) to museums (e.g. Royal Armouries), all types of attraction have been promoted in this way.	British Rail Class 91
The British Empire	Railway companies, anxious to underline their patriotism and also seeking to add a dash of the exotic to their service, found the Empire to be an endless source of good locomotive names. The names of countries, Dominions, regions, colonies and cities in the Empire were all adopted. This trend was at its peak in the early 20th century, but in the 1960s, as Empire shrank, these names disappeared entirely together with the steam locomotives that had carried them.	GWR Bulldog Class; LMS Jubilee Class; LNER Class A4
Castles		GWR Castle Class; HR Castle Class
Christianity	Abbeys, cathedrals and minsters have been popular names (see also 'Attractions on Route'), as have the names of Christian saints and churchmen.	GWR Saint Class; GWR Star Class, rebuilt as Castle Class; British Rail Class 91
Cities & Counties	Principal cities, counties and regions, usually but not always those served by the railway concerned, have been honoured (see also 'British Empire' and 'Towns on Route').	GWR City Class; GWR first County and second County classes; LMS Coronation Class; HR Duke Class; LNER Class D49; BR Class 86, Class 87, Class 90 and Class 91
Clans	The theme of Scottish clans was renewed in late British Rail days for a number of its Mark 2 carriages based in Scotland.	HR Clan Class; BR Clan Class
Commercial & Promotional	In the 1980s, naming of rolling stock started to occur more frequently after some thirty years out of fashion. Unfortunately, many of the names applied since then have been commercial or promotional in nature, and thus rather temporary; some names only being carried for a matter of months. These names celebrate contracts to move coal and other freight (including a series of engines named after shells to mark the link with Shell plc), one-off events (like the Commonwealth Games), or publicity tie-ins with radio stations or newspapers.	BR Class 47, Class 56, Class 58, Class 86 and Class 90
Country Houses	The Great Western Railway in particular mined this source heavily for hundreds of its mixed traffic locomotives.	GWR Saint Class; GWR Hall and Modified Hall Class; GWR Grange Class; GWR Manor Class; LNER Class B17
Flowers		GWR Badminton Class
Football Clubs	For its Class 66 locomotives, GB Railfreight has revived an example set by the LNER of naming some of its locomotives after principal English football clubs.	LNER Class B17
Geographical features - Hills & Dales	As imposing natural sights - and often intriguing names - the application of names of mountains, hills, bens and glens to locomotives has become long-standing. British Rail's Class 44 locos were all named after various UK hills and mountains, giving rise to the nickname for the type of Peaks. Many of BR's Class 60 locomotives were also given these names, although sadly most have now been removed.	HR Ben Class; British Rail Class 44; British Rail Class 60; National Power Class 59
Geographical features - Water	Rivers, lakes, and other bodies have water have featured regularly.	GWR River Class; SECR K and SR K1 classes; HR Loch Class; BR Britannia Class
Geographical features - Winds	The speed and power of fast winds have a clear symbolic link to that of the locomotive.	
Girls' names	Carriages, particularly those operated by the Pullman Car Company or, latterly, private tour operators have carried contemporary girls' names.	
Greek, Roman & Norse Mythology	Mythology has proved to be a rich source of exotic and impressive names for locomotives, particularly during the Victorian era. In more recent times, only the more familiar of the mythological figures have been commemorated, e.g. Odin and Vulcan. Such names were used for the electric passenger train locomotives used on the trans-Pennine Woodhead Line, the more powerful engines carrying female names, and the other class male ones.	BR Class 76 and Class 77
Historic Railways & Locomotives	Companies wishing to show a sense of history and pride, have often applied names that recall historic railway companies and famous old locomotives.	LMS Royal Scot Class; LNER Class A1; BR Britannia Class; British Rail Class 47; British Rail Class 86
Literature	Authors, poets and sometimes their fictional creations as well (see also 'Waverley Novels').	BR Britannia Class; BR Class 86 and Class 92
Monarchs	Railway companies have often sought to gain publicity by naming one of their latest locomotives after the reigning monarch. Historic kings and queens were also remembered. Indeed, the Great Western Railway named a whole class of locos after the Kings of Britain and England working backwards from the then current monarch, King George V. Monarchs of other countries were also honoured, though often generically (e.g. The Belgian Monarch).	GWR Star Class; GWR King Class
Racehorses	It became a tradition to name the principal express locomotives working on the East Coast Main Line after famous racehorses (the implied connection is obvious) and such names were carried by a locomotives in a succession of steam, diesel and electric types.	LNER Class A3; LNER Class A2; British Rail Class 55
Railway Company Directors & Staff	In the past, the senior directors of railway companies often found their names on the sides of their most prestigious locomotives. Later, staff who had been awarded a medal for bravery either in military or civilian life were honoured and, since late British Rail days, this has extended to marking the employment or retirement of long-serving staff, including some relatively low-ranking staff. Both Hunslet-Barclay and GB Railfreight named locomotives operated by them after female members of staff (see also 'Girls' names').	GCR Class 11E; LNER Class A4; British Rail Class 86
Railway Depots	With the upsurge in locomotive naming from the mid-1980s, the staff at many railway depots sought to have one of their fleet named after their depot. In some cases, such a naming celebrated an important anniversary for the depot, its achievement of British Standard 5750 quality status, or even its closure.	
Royal Air Force	The aircraft, airfields, squadrons and their commanders that played an important role in World War II were commemorated by the Southern Railway and Great Western Railway.	GWR Castle Class; SR Battle of Britain Class
Royal Navy (Admirals & Warships)	The Royal Navy has long been an important institution in the United Kingdom, especially during the 19th century when the railways were at their peak. Also many warships are themselves named after attributes that suggest power, speed and strength, which make such names very suitable for locomotives. The London & North Western Railway's Renown Class were nearly all named for British warships, as were British Rail's Warship Class diesel locomotives (TOPS classes 41-43) and, after refurbishment, the Class 50. In the 21st century the Direct Rail Services Class 68 mixed-traffic locomotives carry names shared with Royal Navy ships past and present (with the exception of the first of the class, named 'Evolution').	SR Lord Nelson Class; LNWR Renown Class; LMS Jubilee Class; BR Class 41, Class 42 and Class 43; BR Class 50; Direct Rail Services Class 68
Royalty	An extension of the Monarchs theme, members of the extended Royal Family have also been honoured, including Princes & Princesses and Dukes & Duchesses.	GWR Star Class; LMS Princess Royal Class; LMS Coronation Class
Schools & Universities		SR V Schools class
Science & Engineering	The names of prominent engineers, especially railway and locomotive engineers, scientists and noted figures in industry have inspired names.	GWR Hawthorn Class; GWR Victoria Class; British Rail Class 60; British Rail Class 86
Ships & Shipping Lines	The most famous example is the Southern Railway's Merchant Navy class, where each engine was named after one of the shipping lines that used Southampton docks, which was owned and operated by the Southern Railway. The class was designed during the Second World War and so the naming scheme was also an appropriate tribute to the companies involved in the Battle of the Atlantic. In peacetime the Merchant Navy class were the SR's main express engine and the engines were commonly used on the company's prestigious boat train expresses serving ocean liners at Southampton.	SR Merchant Navy class; British Rail Class 40
Stagecoaches	The railway may have put them out of business, but it was not averse to using the names applied to old stagecoaches to its new locomotives, especially in the early days of the railways.	
Traditional Events	A notable exponent was the naming of many of the LNER's Class D49 after fox hunts.	LNER Class D49
Towns on Route	Whether for promotional reasons, civic pride, or some other reason, many companies in the early 20th century named locomotives after the towns that they served. The London, Tilbury and Southend Railway named all its locomotives in this way. Such names fell out of favour because passengers could sometimes confuse the name of the locomotive with the destination of the train. The Midland Railway denamed all the LTS locos when it took over in 1912, the London, Brighton and South Coast Railway around 1906, and the Great Western Railway removed all such names on its locomotives during 1927-1930.	GWR Swindon Class; GWR Duke and Bulldog Class; LB&SCR A1 Class; SR West Country Class; LMS Patriot Class; ARC Class 59
Wars & Battles	Similar to the British Empire names (see above), war and battle-related names were popular in the early 20th century as a demonstration of patriotism. The Crimean, Boer and First World wars in particular provided inspiration and the Southern Railway used the Battle of Britain as inspiration for some of its 1940s steam locomotives (see 'Royal Air Force'). Some companies also used a locomotive as their war memorial, hence the name Valour, carried by a succession of engines in honour of the war dead (and now on a Class 66 locomotive). Wars could also lead to de-naming; many locomotives with German-sounding names were de-named in the early months of the First World War.	GWR Iron Duke Class; GCR Class 11F; NBR C Class
Waverley Novels	Sir Walter Scott's Waverley Novels provided a source of distinctive names for steam locomotives built before World War I, and again for the post-war LNER-designed Class A1; both characters and locations in the novels being used.	GWR Waverley Class; GWR Saint Class; GCR Class 11F; LNER Class A1
