= British Rail Class 76 =

Class of British electric Bo-Bo locomotives

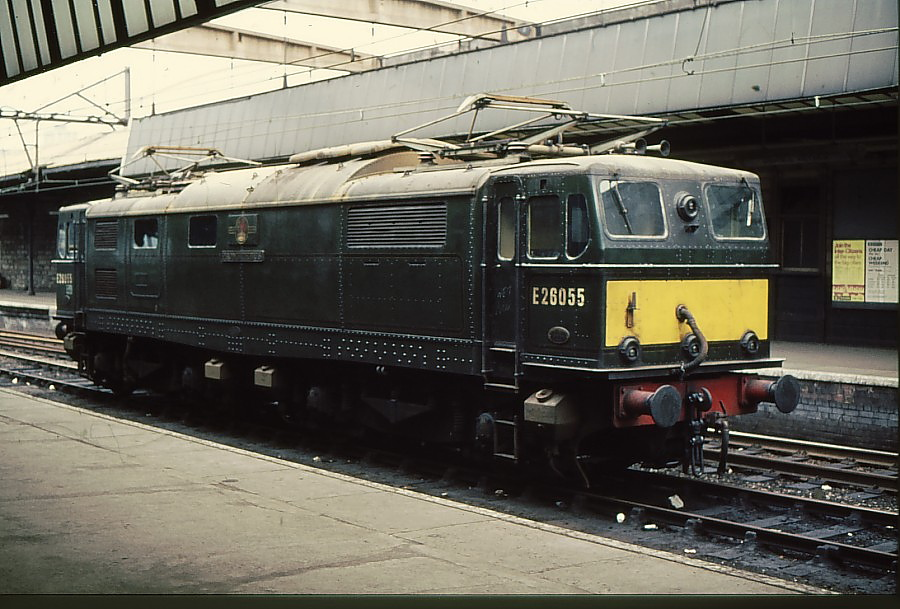
- Locomotive no. E26055 at Sheffield Victoria in 1969.
Type and origin
- Power type: Electric
- Builder: LNER Doncaster Works (prototype) BR Gorton Works
- Serial number: Doncaster 1914; Gorton 1008–1064
- Build date: 1941 (prototype), 1950–1953
- Total produced: 58
Specifications
- Configuration
  - AAR: B-B
  - UIC: Bo′Bo′
  - Commonwealth: Bo+Bo
- Gauge: 4 ft 8 1/2 in (1,435 mm) standard gauge
- Wheel diameter: 4 ft 2 in (1.270 m)
- Length: 50 ft 4 in (15.34 m)
- Loco weight: 87 long tons 18 hundredweight (89.3 t; 98.4 short tons)
- Electric system/s: 1500V DC Catenary
- Current pickups: Pantograph, 2 off
- Traction motors: Metropolitan-Vickers 186, 4 off
- Transmission: Electric
- MU working: Some fitted
- Train heating: Steam generator (14 locomotives)
- Loco brake: Vacuum, Regenerative Braking, later Dual brake
- Train brakes: Vacuum, some later Dual Vacuum / Air
Performance figures
- Maximum speed: 65 mph (105 km/h)
- Power output: Continuous: 1,300 hp (969 kW); One-hour: 1,868 hp (1,393 kW)
- Tractive effort: 45,000 lbf (200 kN)
- Brakeforce: 72 long tons-force (717 kN)
Career
- Operators: LNER (prototype) British Railways
- Numbers: 26000–26057; later E26000–26057; later 76001–76057
- Axle load class: LNER: RA 9 BR: RA 8
- Locale: Manchester–Sheffield–Wath line
- First run: 1947 (prototype)
- Withdrawn: 1970 (prototype), 1981
- Scrapped: 1972 (prototype), 1981-83
- Current owner: National Railway Museum
- Disposition: E26020 preserved, remainder scrapped
- A cab from 76039 Hector and a door from 76051 are also preserved

The British Rail Class 76, also known as Class EM1 (Electric Mixed-Traffic 1), is a class of 1.5 kV DC, Bo+Bo electric locomotive designed for use on the now-closed Woodhead Line in northern England.

== Tommy — the prototype ==
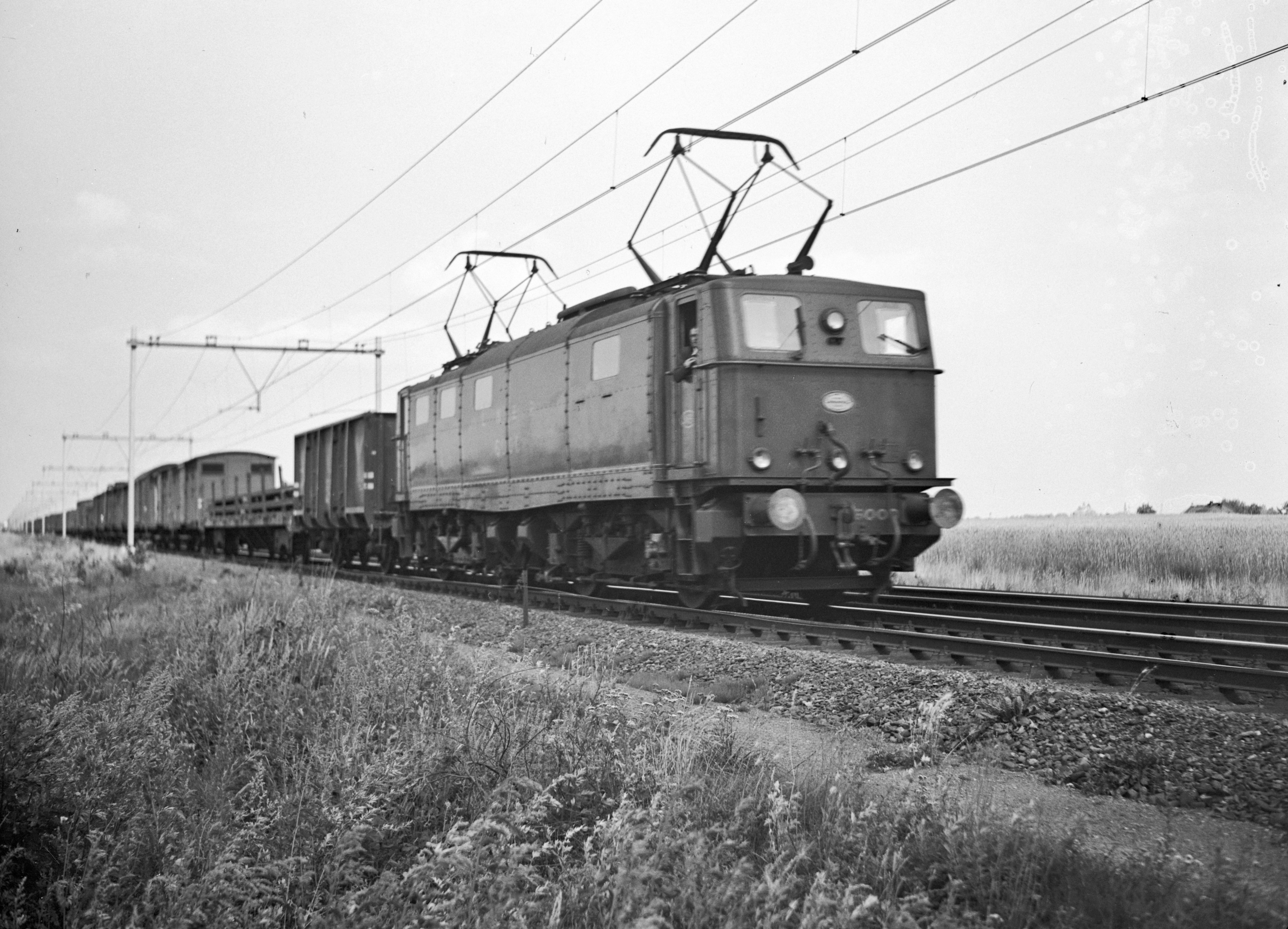
Prototype LNER 6000 Tommy on loan in the Netherlands, hauling a freight train in 1949.

The prototype, LNER No. 6701, was completed at Doncaster Works in 1941 to a design by Sir Nigel Gresley, but electrification of the Woodhead Route, together with construction of 69 similar units, was delayed by the Second World War. It was tested on the few sections of 1500 V DC lines owned by the LNER, but had not worked any great distance by 1947 when it was loaned to Dutch Railways to help with their post-war shortage of locomotives. In September 1945, the LNER assigned it the classification EM1; previously, it had been unclassified.

The prototype locomotive, renumbered 6000 in June 1946, remained on Dutch Railways until 1952 when the Woodhead electrification was complete. While in the Netherlands, it gained the name Tommy after the nickname given to British soldiers and ran for the rest of its working life with a nameplate, which included an explanation of the origin: "So named by drivers of the Netherlands State Railway to whom this locomotive was loaned 1947-1952." It was renumbered to 26000 following the formation of British Railways.

When new, the locomotive had Westinghouse air brakes and dual air and vacuum brakes were provided for the train. For operations in the Netherlands, the vacuum brake equipment was disconnected. When returned to Britain, the vacuum brake was restored but the air brake for the train was removed.

26000 Tommy was used in everyday service, alongside the other EM1 locomotives equipped with train heating boilers. It was withdrawn in March 1970 and scrapped at Crewe two years later, when passenger services were withdrawn over the Woodhead route and several locomotives became surplus to requirements.

The time in the Netherlands had shown that the design did not ride well at high speed, due to the bogie design. The buffers and couplings were mounted on the bogies which were then linked together by a drawbar, a feature intended to remove stress from the superstructure. It was also felt that the cabs were too small with poor visibility.

== Production locomotives ==
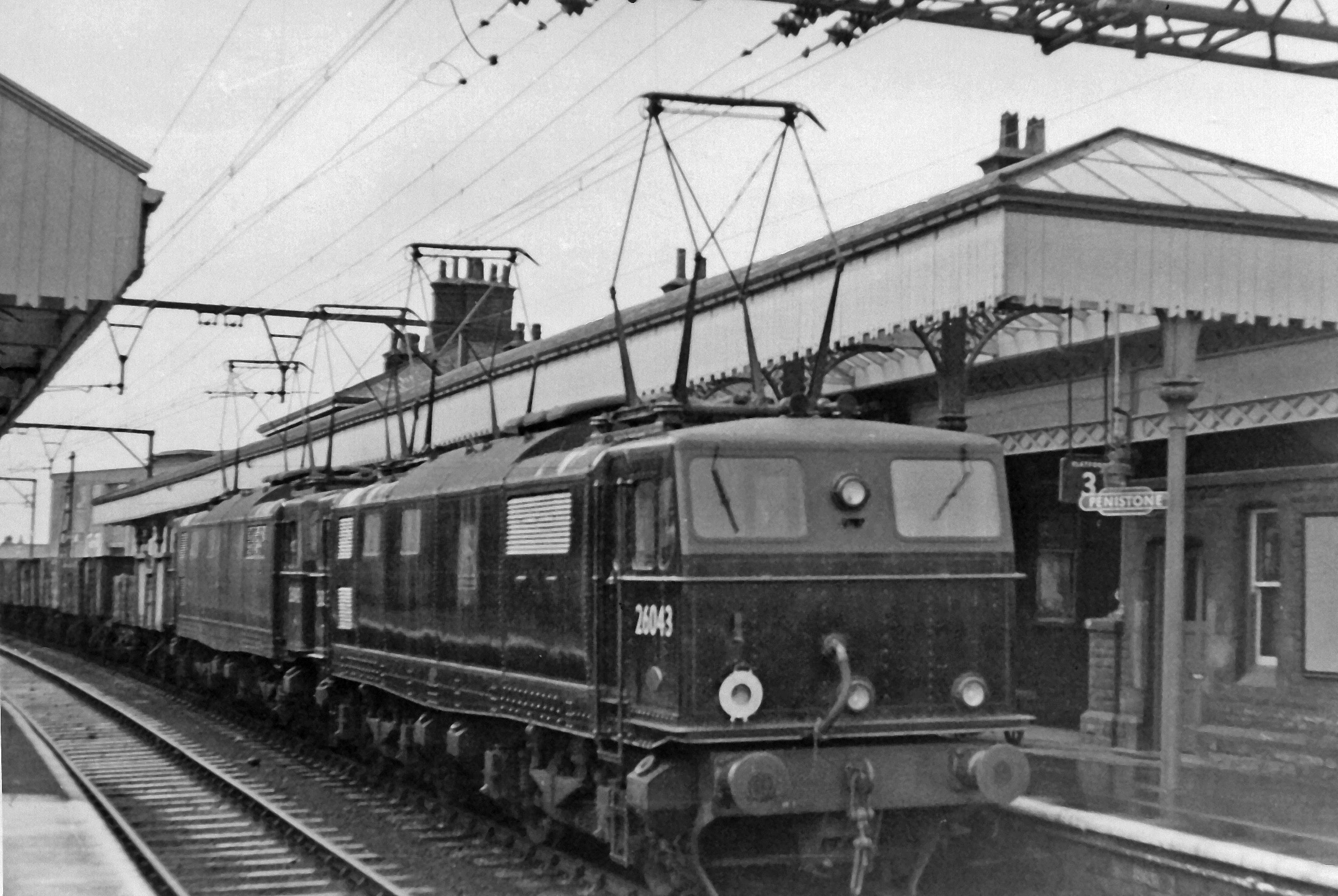
Two Class EM1 locomotives at Penistone in 1954

Between 1950 and 1953, a further 57 locomotives were built at Gorton locomotive works, Manchester, to a modified design; these were also classified EM1. There were also to have been 24 built at Darlington Works, but these were cancelled. Electrical equipment was supplied by Metropolitan-Vickers, who completed the final assembly of the locomotives at Dukinfield Works. They were later reclassified as Class 76, under the TOPS classification scheme introduced on 28 March 1968.

The locomotives were fitted with twin diamond-shaped pantographs. At certain points on the Woodhead Line, notably in the vicinity of steam locomotive water-columns, the electric overhead lines were as high as 20 feet above the tracks. The pantographs had to stretch to almost their full height to reach the wires at some points, as BR practice utilised both raised in normal Woodhead operation in order to maximise current collection under any weather condition.

Although mainly intended for freight working, the locomotives also regularly worked Woodhead Line passenger services – especially after the sale of the Class 77 locomotives to the Netherlands Railways in 1968. Fourteen locomotives (26020, 26046–26057) were fitted with Bastian & Allen steam heating apparatus. Thirteen of these gained classical Greek names; these were removed in 1970, after the discontinuance of passenger services in January of that year.

Named Class 76 locomotives
Loco	Name	Named
26046	Archimedes	May 1959
26047	Diomedes	September 1960
26048	Hector	March 1960
26049	Jason	August 1960
26050	Stentor	August 1960
26051	Mentor	June 1959
26052	Nestor	August 1961
26053	Perseus	October 1960
26054	Pluto	April 1961
26055	Prometheus	June 1959
26056	Triton	July 1959
26057	Ulysses	April 1960

=== Brief stay in Essex ===
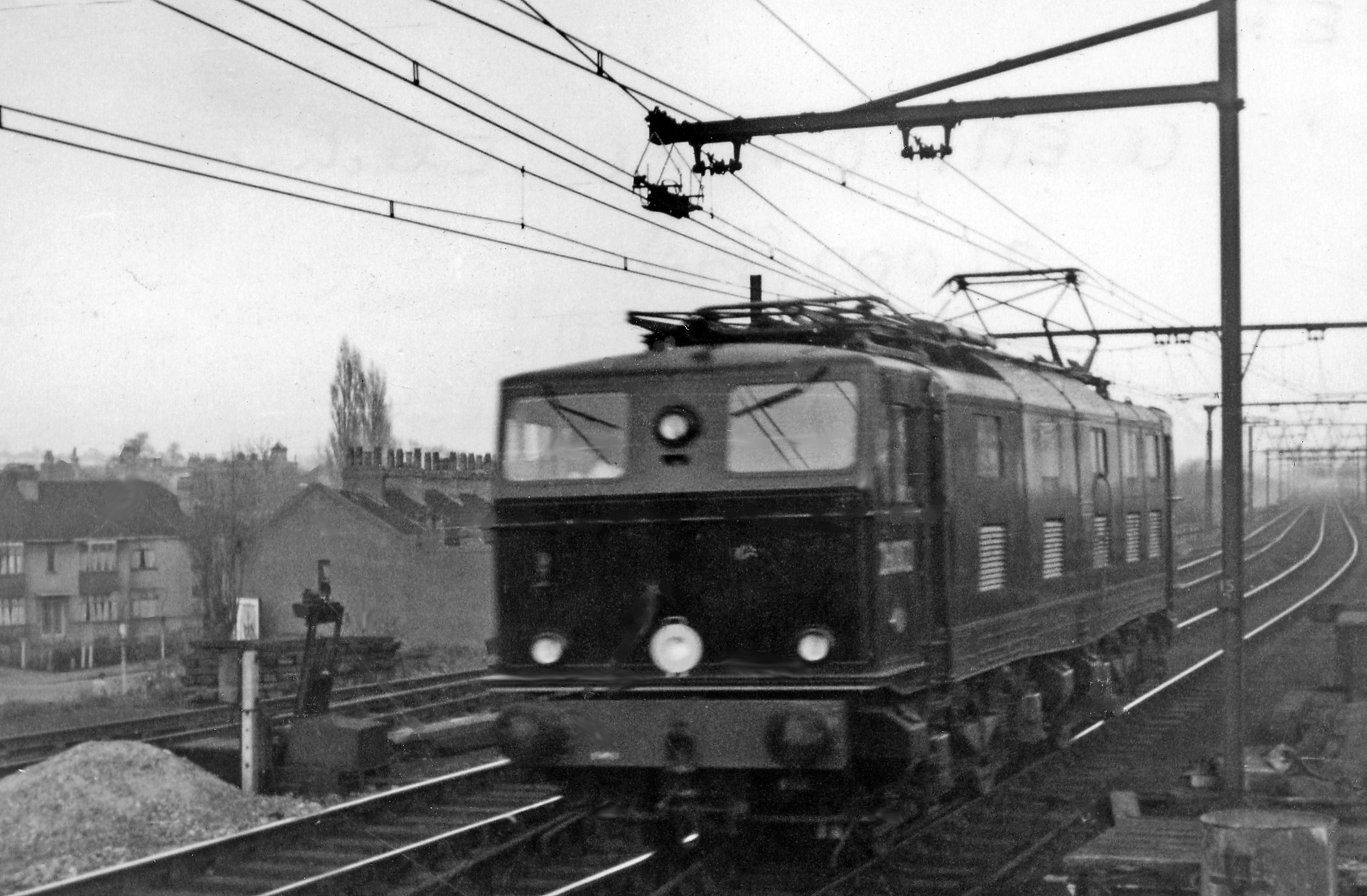
An EM1 under trial in Essex in 1950

The first section of the Manchester to Sheffield Woodhead route, between Dunford Bridge and Wath, was not electrified until 4 February 1952. The lines between London Liverpool Street and Shenfield had already been electrified in September 1949, using the same 1500 V DC system. On 27 October 1950, the first two locomotives to be completed, nos. 26001 and 26002, were sent to Ilford depot in Essex for trials; these were joined by 26003–26010 in early 1951. The trials involved a variety of trains, passenger and freight, including tests of the regenerative braking system on Brentwood bank, which has a gradient of 1:103 (0.97%). In June 1951, the ten locomotives were sent north to Wath, where the overhead lines had recently been energised, for further trials.

=== Brakes and controls ===
The locomotives were fitted with air brakes and regenerative braking; the latter, which could only be used at speeds between 16 and 55 mph (26 and 89 km/h), caused current to be fed back into the wires during the long descents on both sides of the Woodhead Tunnel and so assisting any train which was ascending at the time. Rheostatic braking was also fitted several years later as an additional safety precaution; this was effective below 20 mph (32 km/h). Train brakes were operated by vacuum. From November 1968, thirty of the locomotives were modified for multiple unit (M.U.) control. This became particularly important from January 1970 with the introduction of Merry-Go-Round coal trains from South Yorkshire to Fiddlers Ferry power station near Widnes, operated by two Class 76s (and banked by two extra locomotives up the Worsborough incline between Wombwell and Silkstone). Such trains became the mainstay of the Woodhead Line in the 1970s. Locomotives fitted with M.U. control were also given train air brakes; the last nine conversions had their train vacuum brakes removed at the same time. A Clearcall intercom system was fitted, allowing communication between the drivers of the leading pair and the banking pair of locomotives via the overhead line. An early version of this system had been tried on six of the locomotives in the late 1950s, but had been abandoned as unsatisfactory following tests concluding 26 May 1960. Beyond the Woodhead Line, the trains to Fiddlers Ferry were diesel-hauled west of Manchester.

=== Liveries ===
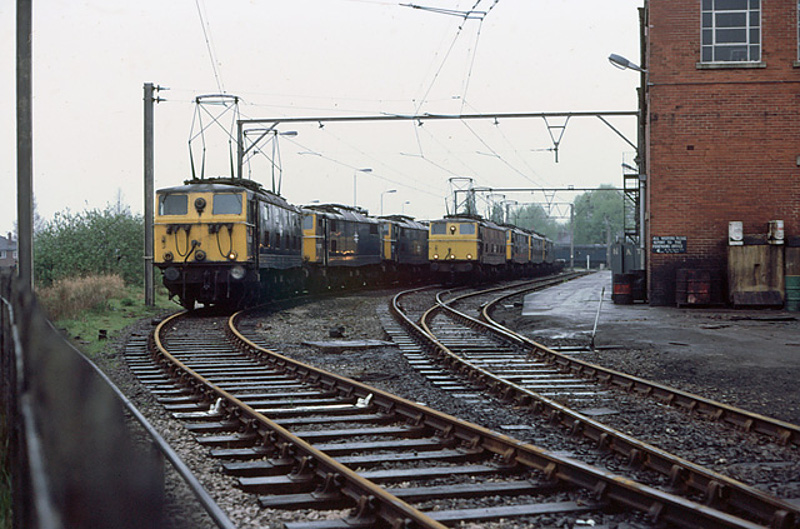
Class 76s at Reddish depot in 1981, shortly before their withdrawal

As delivered, the locomotives were painted black with red lining. No. 26020 was given a special finish for exhibition at the Festival of Britain in 1951; this included stainless steel handrails and cab window surrounds. From the late 1950s onwards, Brunswick green was adopted, with black and orange lining; small yellow warning panels on the cab ends being applied from 1966. From the late 1960s and until withdrawal, the Class 76s started to appear in British Rail monastral blue with yellow cab ends.

=== Renumbering ===
The production series of locomotives were numbered 26001–57 when new, following on from the prototype. From 1966, a prefix letter "E" (for Electric) was added; the process was gradual, and by March 1970, only nos. 26035/42 remained without the prefix – they were withdrawn that month. The TOPS class 76 was allotted on 28 March 1968, and beginning in November 1971 (when no. E26050 was renumbered 76050), most of the locomotives were given TOPS numbers. By this time, a further six (E26000/5/17/9/31/45) had been withdrawn, and so 50 locomotives took up numbers between 76001 and 76057. During 1976, some locomotives were again renumbered, the intention being to bring the nine locomotives having train air brakes (without vacuum brake) into the block 76031–9. Under this plan, nos. 76044/18 took the vacant numbers 76031/35 respectively, while three pairs of locomotives exchanged numbers: 76003 and 76036; 76050 and 76038; 76048 and 76039.

== Withdrawal ==
The disposition of the Class 76 was inextricably tied to the fate of the Woodhead Line. The reduction of the freight traffic on the line, along with the ending of passenger services, resulted in the early withdrawal of several locomotives. Five, nos. E26000/5/17 and 26035/42, were withdrawn in March 1970 – of these, E26000 was non-standard and surplus; E26017 had received accident damage at one end; and 26035/42 had sustained electrical damage. Three more, nos. E26019/31/45 were withdrawn in October and November 1971. These eight early withdrawals were all scrapped between March 1971 and October 1972.

No more withdrawals took place until 1977: nos. 76048/50/5/7 were withdrawn in February that year; 76020 in August; nos. 76002/4/43/52/6 in June 1978; and nos. 76001/41/6/7/9/53 followed in November 1980. No. 76020, the locomotive that had been exhibited at the Festival of Britain, was selected for preservation, but the other 1977–1980 withdrawals were stored, not being scrapped until some years later. All of the withdrawn locomotives up to this point were equipped with vacuum brakes only.

By the late 1970s, the locomotives were amongst the oldest in service and yet one of the most reliable classes, on account of robust design on British Rail; their replacement would ultimately become necessary. However, in July 1981, the closure of the Woodhead Line, between Hadfield in the west and Penistone in the east, resulted in the withdrawal of the entire fleet. The final service was operated in the early hours of 18 July 1981 by 76006 and 76014, hauling freight to Manchester. The remaining 34 locomotives, nos. 76003/6–16/21–40/51/4, which included all of those having dual or air train brakes, were withdrawn en masse in July 1981. Scrapping of these, together with those withdrawn in 1977–1980 (except for the preserved no. 76020), began in February 1983 and was completed in December 1984.

The class had served well, having been built to a sound design and well-maintained by the maintenance teams of Reddish and Wath. Most were still entirely serviceable when withdrawn. However, the Netherlands Railways were interested in their purchase for their heavy freight trains mainly from the North Sea Europoort inland, following a good service record of the prototype 6000 Tommy.

Controversy regarding the closure of the Woodhead Line, BR and government policies, plus BR's intention to avoid embarrassment regarding a sale for further use (thus discrediting their claims of expired working life from their traction policies, as had happened with the sale of the Class 77s) as well the greater age of the Class 76s compared with the Class 77s back in 1968, ultimately cancelled the sale. Accordingly, the remaining locomotives were scrapped, many at the yards of Booths of Rotherham, apart from a single preserved example now in the National Railway Museum in York.

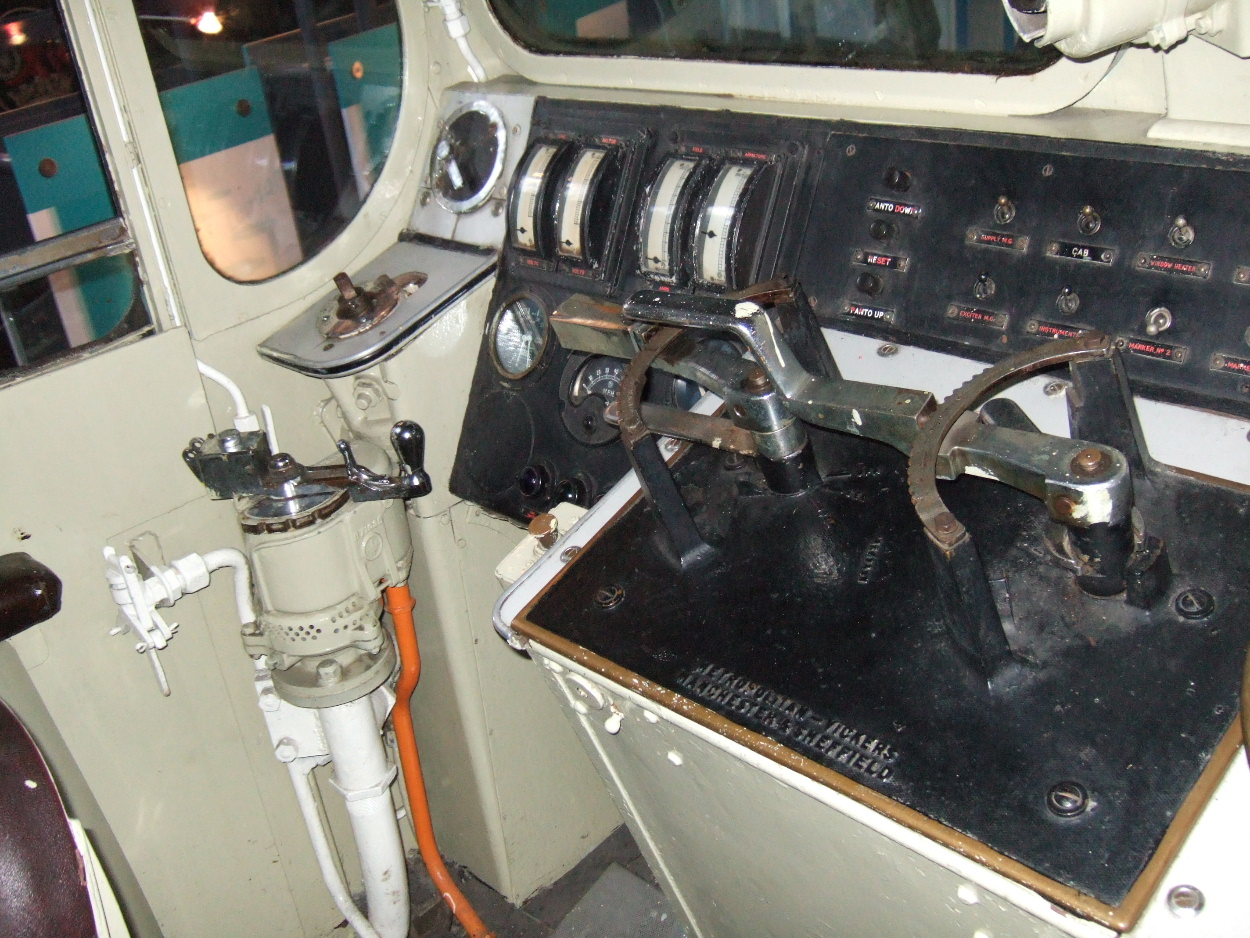
The drivers controls of a Class 76

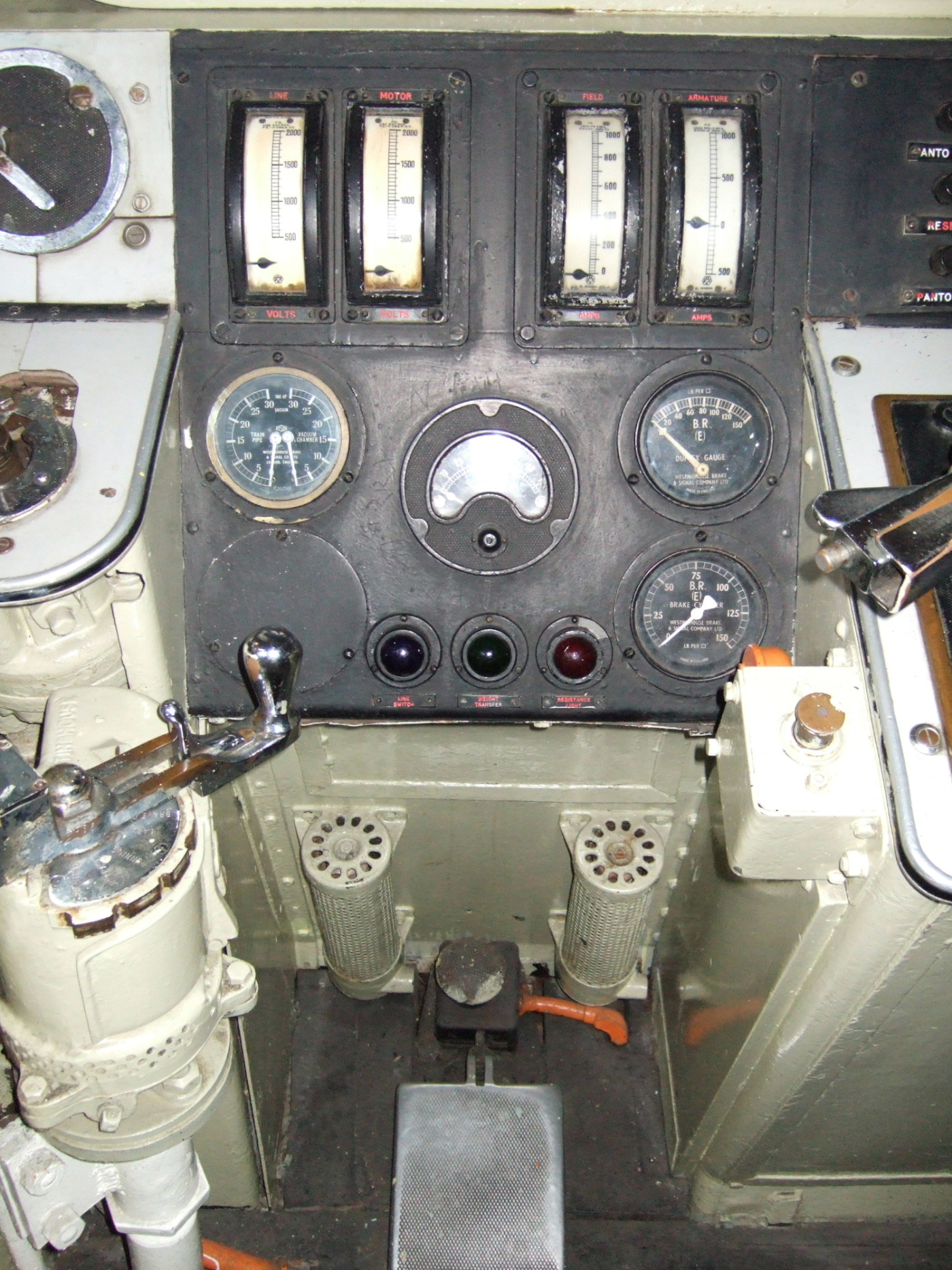
Controls and gauges in a Class 76 cab

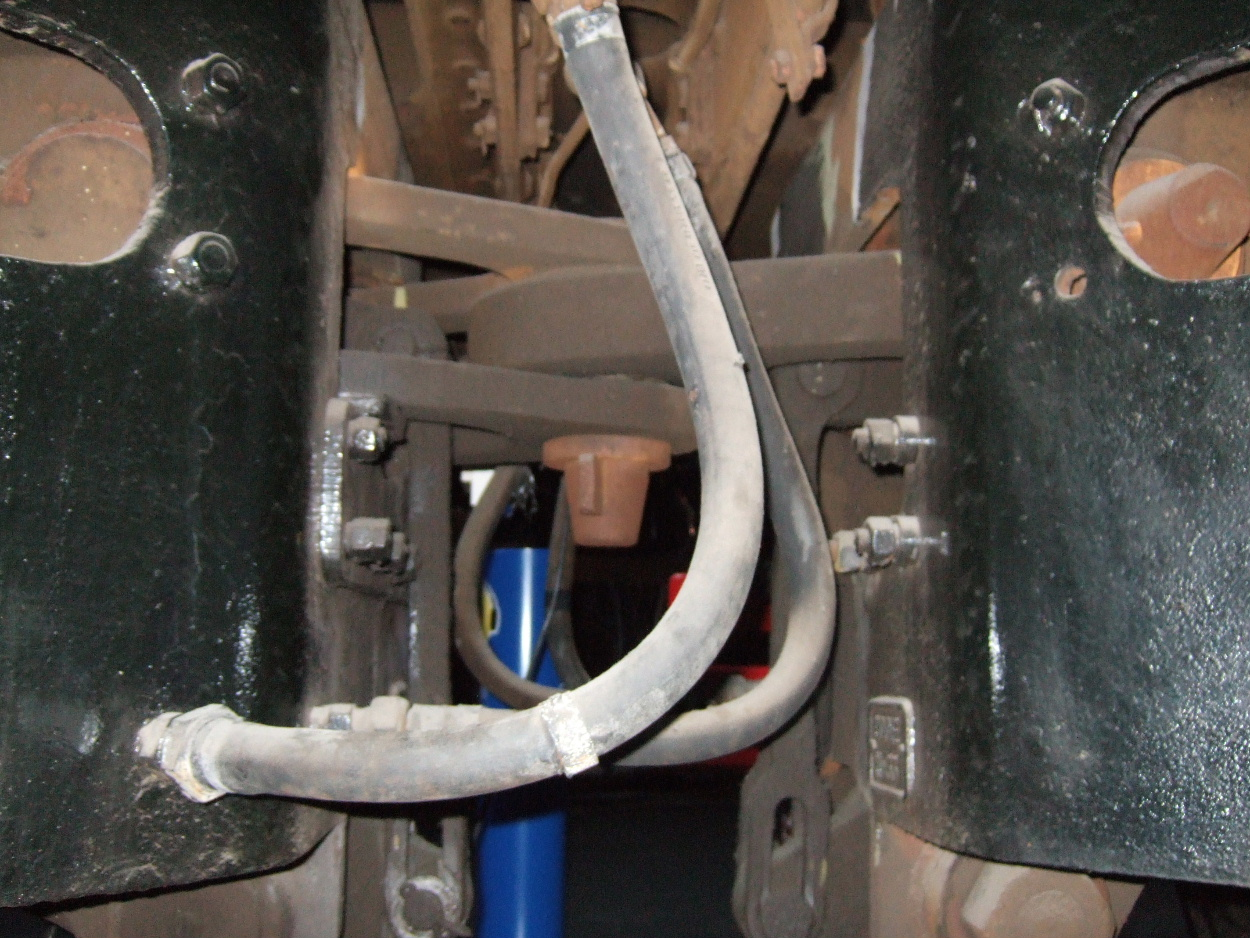
Coupling between bogies on a Class 76

== Preservation ==
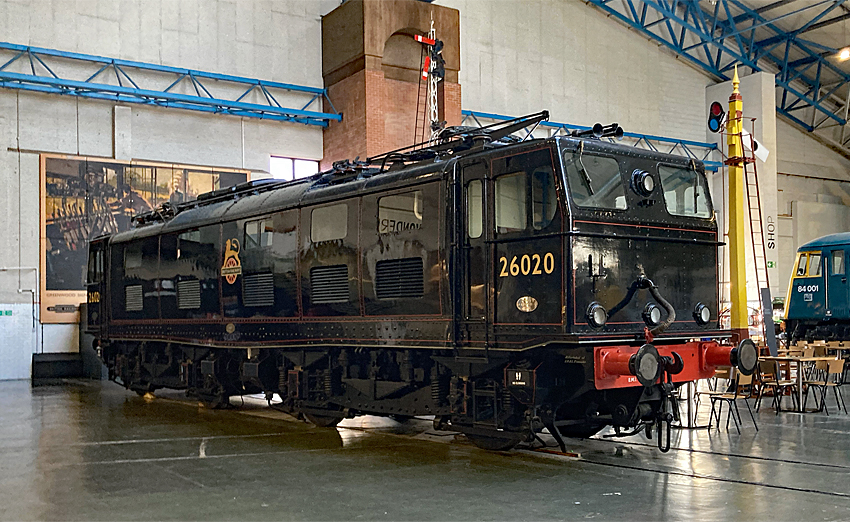
26020 preserved at the NRM

One locomotive has been preserved by the National Railway Museum in York; no. 26020, later 76020, was specially chosen because it was built with stainless steel handrails and had been exhibited at the Festival of Britain. Later, it was the locomotive that pulled the opening day train through the Woodhead Tunnel. It retains the stainless steel handrails, although they are currently painted over.

One cab from another locomotive, 76039 Hector, which was formerly displayed at the Science and Industry Museum in Manchester, is now at the South Yorkshire Transport Museum in Aldwarke, Rotherham.

A complete cabside and a driver's door from 76051 Mentor are preserved, in their original condition, at Barrow Hill Roundhouse, near Chesterfield.

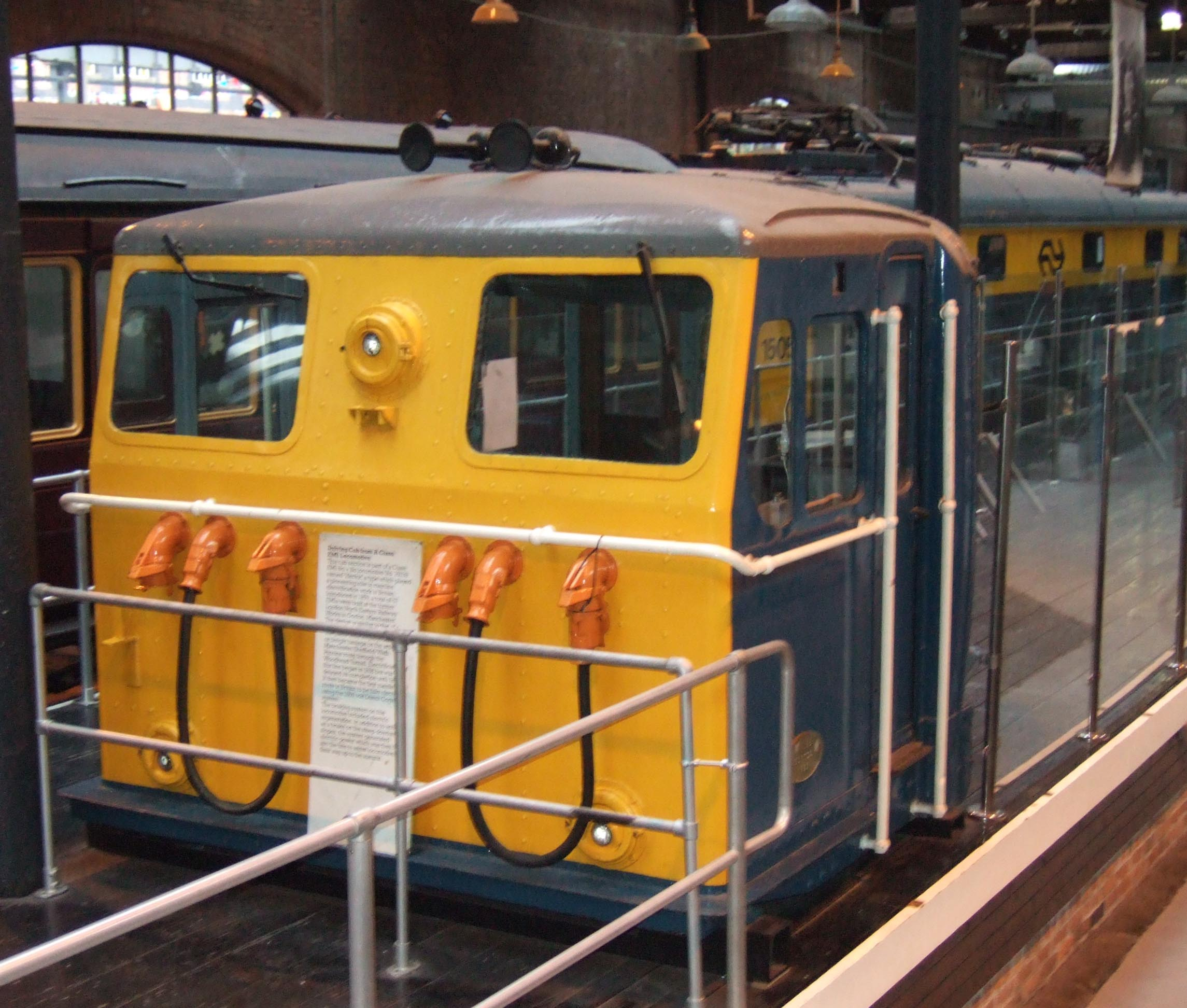
A cab of 76039 at the Science and Industry Museum in Manchester

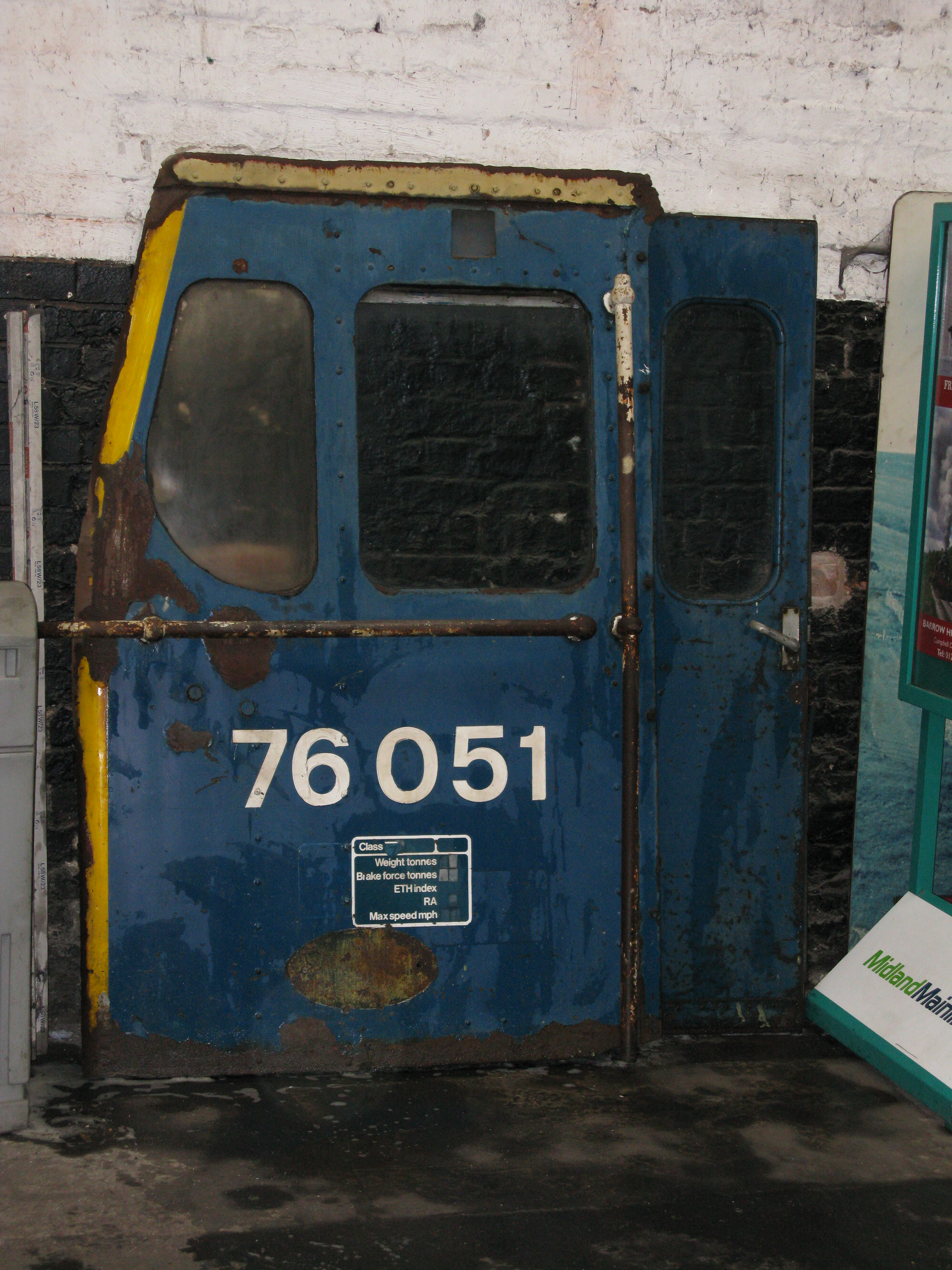
Cabside and a door from 76051 at Barrow Hill, near Chesterfield

== Models ==
Trix Twin Railway produced an H0 scale model of E26010 in black livery in 1959 and in green livery in 1960.

Heljan produces 00 scale models of E26051, in BR Green with half yellow panels, and 76014 in BR Blue.

Class 76 is being made as a kit and a ready-to-run model in OO gauge by Silver Fox Models.

The EM1 - Class 76 model is being made as a 3D printed resin kit in N gauge by Bees Hill Models.

== See also ==
- British Rail Class 77
- New South Wales 46 class locomotive
