= Rotherwood exchange sidings =

Coordinates: 53.371642°N 1.364686°W

Rotherwood exchange sidings were set at the eastern extremity of the Manchester-Sheffield-Wath electric railway between Orgreave Lane and Retford Road, on the south eastern boundary of the City of Sheffield with the Parish of Orgreave, within Rotherham.

The sidings, located approximately at milepost 46¾ (measured from Manchester Piccadilly), consisted of two sets of lines split between the up and down sides of the line, and were laid out for the purpose of locomotive changing on trains passing through the area. Originally steam, later diesel locomotives brought trains, particularly coal from the Nottinghamshire coalfield to the down sidings, where the motive power was changed to electric traction for the run over Woodhead to Mottram yard where it was changed again for steam (later diesel) to continue its journey. The returning empty traffic was changed over in the up sidings.

Entry to the down sidings was by Permissive block regulations from Woodhouse East Junction and on busy days trains would queue for the full distance. The sidings were controlled by a British Railways built signal box set at the east end of the up sidings on the down side of the line.
