= GCR Class 8H =

Class of British steam locomotives

Great Central Railway class 8H
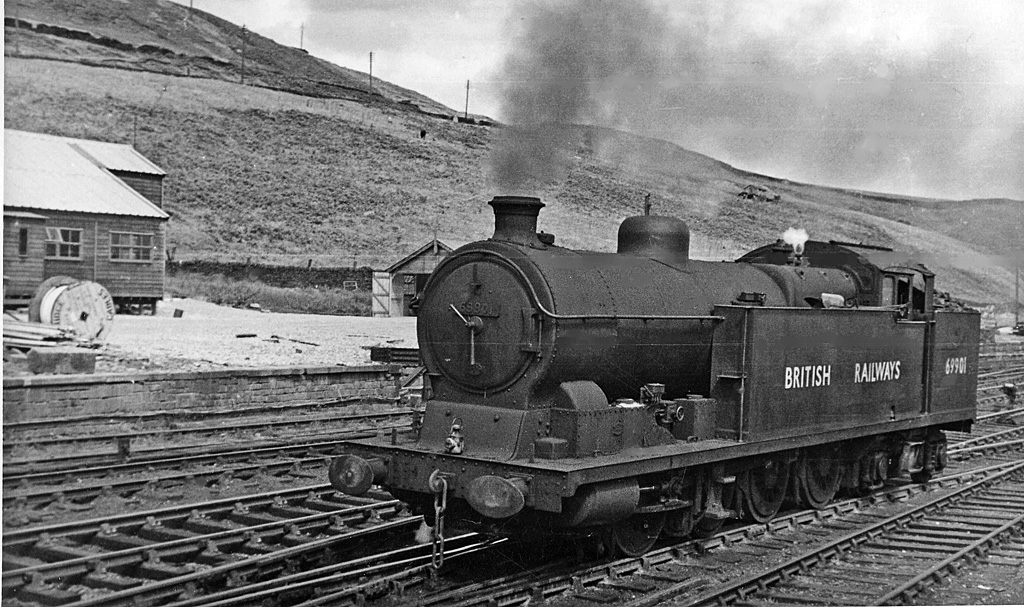
- 69901 at Dunford Bridge on the Woodhead Line in 1950
Type and origin
- Power type: Steam
- Designer: John G. Robinson
- Build date: 1907 (4), 1932 (2)
- Total produced: 6
Specifications
- Configuration
  - Whyte: 0-8-4T
  - UIC: D2′ n3t, later D2′ h3t
- Gauge: 4 ft 8 1/2 in (1,435 mm)
- Driver dia.: 4 ft 8 in (1.422 m)
- Trailing dia.: 3 ft 2 in (0.965 m)
- Loco weight: S1/1: 99 long tons 6 cwt (222,400 lb or 100.9 t); S1/2: 99 long tons 2 cwt (222,000 lb or 100.7 t); S1/3: 99 long tons 1 cwt (221,900 lb or 100.6 t)
- Fuel type: Coal
- Boiler pressure: 180 psi (1.24 MPa)
- Cylinders: Three
- Cylinder size: 18 in × 26 in (457 mm × 660 mm)
- Valve gear: Stephenson
- Valve type: Slide valves
Performance figures
- Tractive effort: 34,525 lbf (153.6 kN)
Career
- Operators: Great Central Railway; → London and North Eastern Railway; → British Railways
- Class: GCR: 8H; LNER: S1
- Numbers: GCR: 1170–1173; LNER: 6170–6173; later 9900–9905; BR: 69900–69905
- Withdrawn: 1955–1957
- Disposition: All scrapped

The Great Central Railway Class 8H (LNER Class S1) was a class of 0-8-4T steam tank locomotives designed by John G. Robinson for hump shunting at Wath marshalling yard.

== Overview ==
Four locomotives were built in 1907/1908 for the Great Central Railway. They were fitted with three cylinders. This gave a more even torque than with a 2-cylinder locomotive and reduced the risk of wheelslip under heavy load. All four passed into London and North Eastern Railway ownership at the 1923 grouping. At the time all four locomotives were allocated to Mexborough engine shed.

These were powerful locomotives but even more power was required so, in 1930, one locomotive was fitted with a superheater and a booster engine and classified S1/2. Two new locomotives (with superheaters and boosters) were built by the LNER in 1932 and classified S1/3. The remaining (non-booster) locomotives were classified S1/1 and were also fitted with superheaters. All the boosters were removed in 1943.

All six locomotives passed into British Railways ownership in 1948 and were numbered 69900-69905.

== Dimensions ==
- Locomotive weight:
  - S1/1, 99 tons 6 cwt
  - S1/2, 99 tons 2 cwt
  - S1/3, 99 tons 1 cwt
- Superheater:
  - S1/1, No, but fitted later
  - S1/2, Yes
  - S1/3, Yes
- Tractive effort, 34,525 lbf (153.6 kN)
  - Booster tractive effort, 12,373 lbf (55.0 kN)
    - Combined tractive effort, 46,896 lbf (208.6 kN)

For terminology, see Steam locomotive components
