= British Rail Class 77 =

Class of electric locomotives

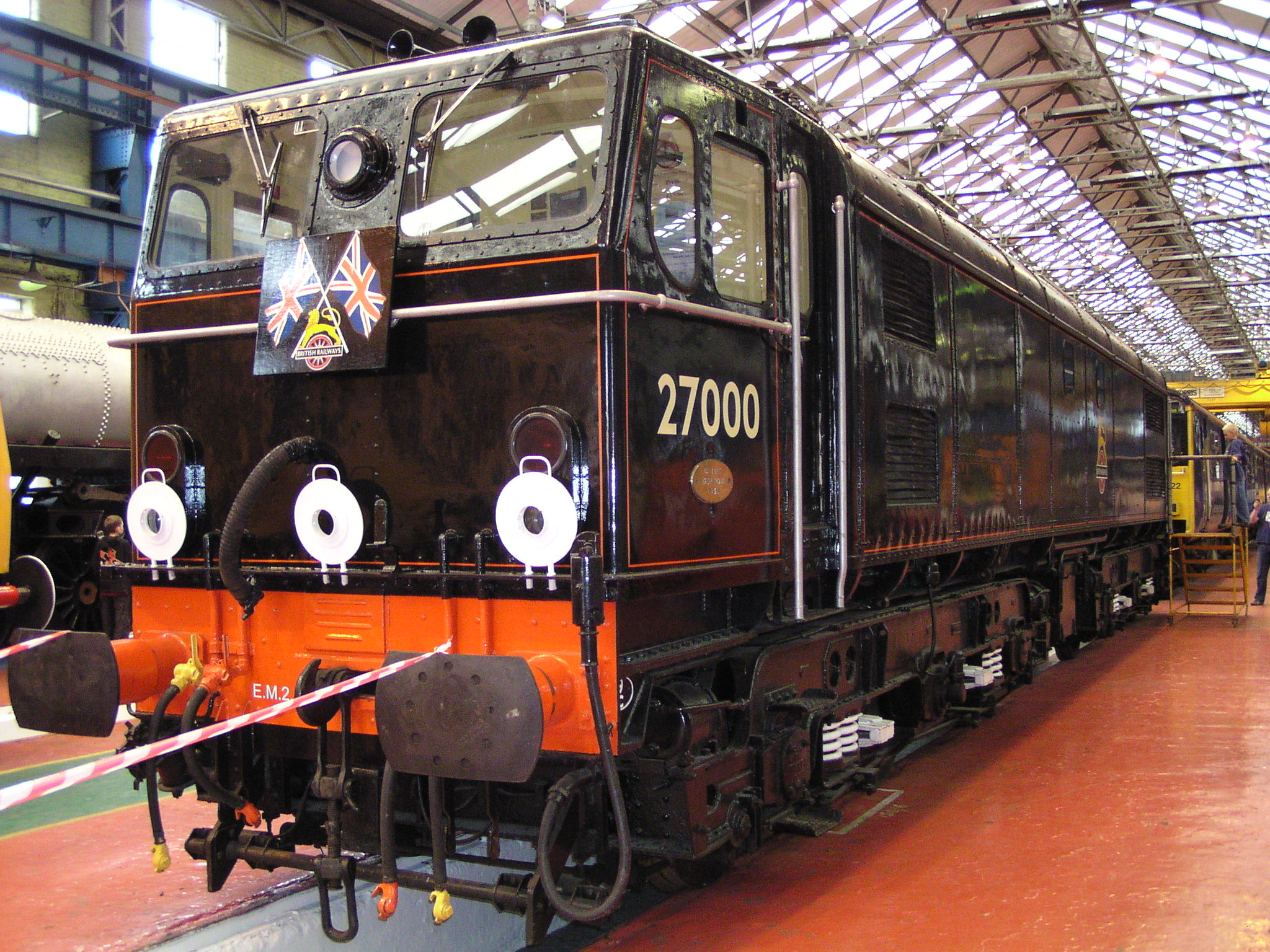
- Preserved locomotive no. 27000 in original black livery
Type and origin
- Power type: Electric
- Builder: BR Gorton Works
- Build date: 1953–1954
- Total produced: 7
Specifications
- Configuration
  - UIC: Co′Co′
  - Commonwealth: Co-Co
- Gauge: 4 ft 8 1/2 in (1,435 mm) standard gauge
- Wheel diameter: 3 ft 7 in (1.092 m)
- Length: 59 ft 0 in (17.98 m)
- Loco weight: 102.5 long tons (104.1 t; 114.8 short tons)
- Electric system/s: 1500V DC Catenary
- Current pickups: Pantograph, x 2
- Traction motors: Metropolitan-Vickers
- Train heating: Steam generator
- Loco brake: Air and electrical regenerative
- Train brakes: Vacuum
Performance figures
- Maximum speed: 90 mph (145 km/h)
- Power output: 2,490 hp (1,857 kW)
- Tractive effort: 45,000 lbf (200 kN)
- Brakeforce: 85 long tons-force (847 kN)
Career
- Operators: British Railways
- Numbers: 27000–27006
- Locale: Manchester–Sheffield–Wath line
- Retired: September 1968
- Disposition: All sold to Netherlands as NS 1500 Class

The British Rail Class 77, also known as Class EM2, is a class of 1.5 kV DC, Co-Co electric locomotive. They were built by Gorton Works in 1953 and 1954 for use over the Woodhead Line, between Manchester and Sheffield.

== Description ==
Seven locomotives of this type were constructed. They represented the first Co-Co type of overhead electric locomotive built for use in the United Kingdom. The design was based on that of the smaller Class EM1, which dated from 1941. Initially, 27 locomotives of this type had been planned, but by the early 1950s, the benefits of using the 25 kV AC system had been demonstrated, which meant that the Woodhead Line would be an isolated electric system. Consequently, the order was reduced to just seven locomotives.

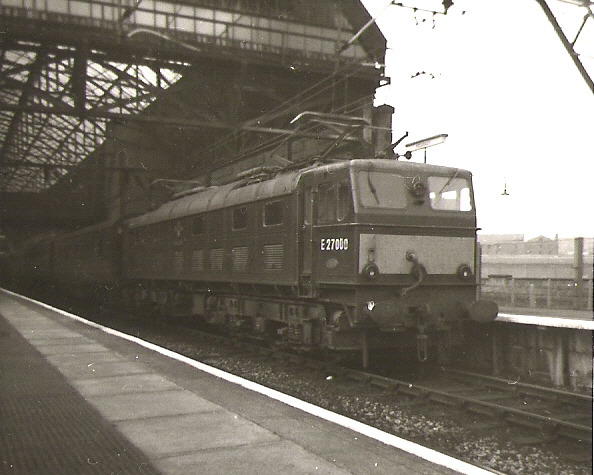
A Class 77 (E27000 Electra) hauled passenger train waiting at Manchester Piccadilly in 1967

The locomotives were initially numbered 27000 to 27006 and were painted in British Railways' black livery. Construction of the bodies and bogies took place at Gorton Works, Manchester (Gorton works numbers 1065–71) with electrical equipment supplied by Metropolitan-Vickers and fitted at Dukinfield. In 1959 and 1960, all seven locomotives were given names from characters from Greek mythology. The engines were primarily used for express passenger trains between Manchester Piccadilly and Sheffield Victoria. To heat the carriages, the locomotives were each fitted with a Bastian & Allen electrically-powered steam generator. In 1957, the class was renumbered with the addition of an "E" prefix to the number. In the early 1960s, the class started to receive the standard BR green livery. At least one of the class, E27002, received the electric blue livery carried by the AC electric locomotives.

The class was withdrawn en masse in September 1968. They were stored at Bury by BR in the hope of sale to a foreign railway. The passenger service for which the Class 77s were built continued to be operated by Class 76s, until its withdrawal on 5 January 1970. The Woodhead Line was closed as a through route in 1981, leaving just stubs between Manchester Piccadilly and Hadfield in the West and Sheffield Victoria and Deepcar in the East.

In the mid-1950s, forty new and more powerful 46 class electric locomotives were built by Metropolitan-Vickers for the New South Wales Government Railways. The 46 class was based on the EM1 and EM2.

== Further use ==
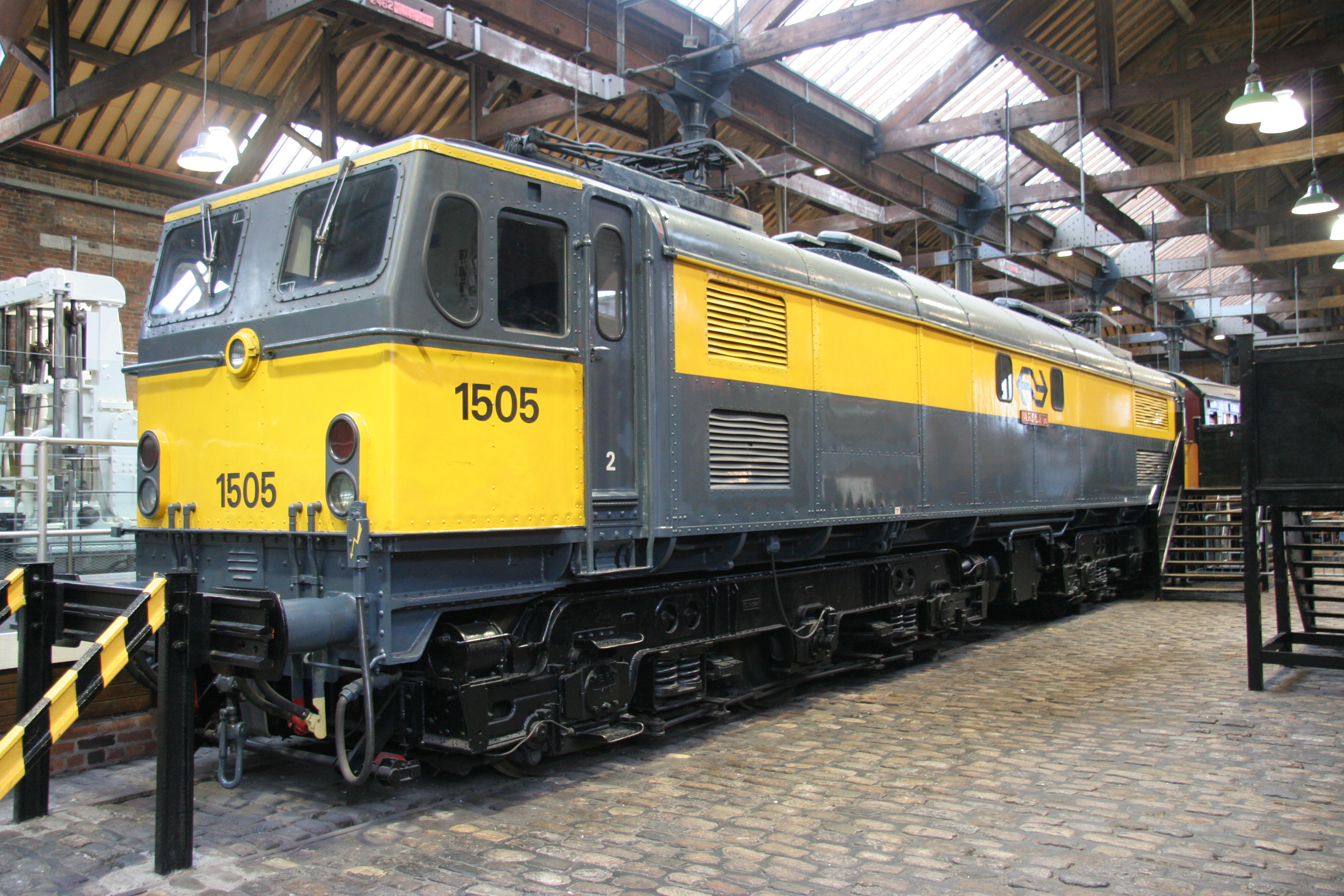
NS 1500 Class no. 1505 at Manchester Museum of Science and Industry

In September 1969 the entire class was sold to the Dutch national railway operator Nederlandse Spoorwegen (NS), where they became NS 1500 Class. They were renumbered in the 1500 series in the order they left their workshops, where they received various modifications, including new headlight clusters. The locomotives also retained their names. One locomotive, no. E27005 Minerva was broken up and used for spares. The remaining six locomotives were employed until final withdrawal in 1985. Their main work was on The Hague—Cologne express trains as far as the border at Venlo although they travelled to their home depot at Maastricht either with a train or light engine on Sunday for their weekly examination before returning to traffic the following day. They were sometimes to be found on freight trains bound for the German border originating in the Rotterdam area.

Upon retirement by NS, two were repatriated to England for preservation. In May 1989. 27000 returned to the Netherlands for the NS 150th celebrations, operating a number of tours.

Two bogies that were originally under 27004 and obtained as spares for 27000 were purchased by the Ivatt Diesel Re-creation Society for future use as part of their re-creation of LMS 10000, whose bogies were of similar construction.

== Fleet details ==
Key:	Preserved	Scrapped

BR number		NS number	Name	Disposal
1955	1957	NS number	Name	Disposal
27000	E27000	1502	Electra	Preserved at Midland Railway - Butterley
27001	E27001	1505	Ariadne	Preserved at the Science and Industry Museum in Manchester
27002	E27002	1506	Aurora	Scrapped (02/1985)
27003	E27003	1501	Diana	Preserved in the Utrecht Railway Museum by Werkgroep 1501
27004	E27004	1503	Juno	Scrapped (10/1986)
27005	E27005	-	Minerva	Used for parts by NS. Scrapped (11/1969)
27006	E27006	1504	Pandora	Scrapped (02/1985)

== Model railways ==
In 2013, Heljan was commissioned to produce OO gauge models of EM2 locomotives in several liveries.
