= Wath marshalling yard =

Railway marshalling yard in England

Coordinates: 53.510°N 1.3542°W

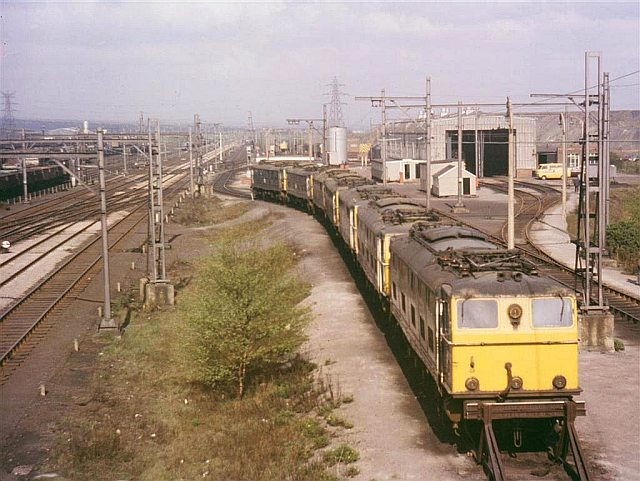
Wath Railway Depot and Yards

Wath marshalling yard, also known as Wath concentration yard (grid reference SE428017), was a large railway marshalling yard specifically designed for the concentration of coal traffic. It was set at the heart of the South Yorkshire Coalfield, at Wath-upon-Dearne, approximately halfway between Barnsley and Doncaster, in the United Kingdom. It opened in 1907 and closed in 1988.

== History ==
The idea of a yard for the concentration of coal traffic developed following a visit by the Great Central Railway's General Manager, Sam Fay (later Sir Sam Fay) to the United States. It was built by Logan and Hemingway, a contractor regularly used by the Great Central Railway and the Manchester, Sheffield and Lincolnshire Railway before them, and opened in August 1907.

At this time a significant amount of rail-borne coal traffic was wagon-load. Customers would order coal direct from individual collieries, which would utilise the railways to deliver the coal in the colliery's own four-wheel wagons that usually carried between 12 and 16 tons of coal. These customers could be anything from a domestic coal merchant ordering a single wagon of coal to be delivered to a station goods yard for local delivery, up to rail-connected industry that would consume many thousands of tons of coal a month. All this generated a very complex pattern of rail traffic from the 45 collieries that were working within a ten-mile radius of Wath.

The purpose of the yard was to make this traffic more efficient by concentrating the marshalling of the wagons of coal from the local collieries in a central position. Coal wagons were "tripped" in local trains from each colliery to the yard, then sorted into longer distance trains which would deliver to a marshalling yard near the customer, from where the wagons would again be re-sorted into new local "trip" trains that delivered the wagons to their individual destinations. Throughout its lifetime, the yard handled loaded and empty coal and coke wagons almost to the exclusion of other traffic.

Many trains were sent over the Woodhead Line to a yard at Mottram, near Manchester, where they were divided for distribution throughout the North-West. Another major destination for the coal traffic was the steam trawler bunkering sidings at New Clee, near Grimsby, and after 1912 export coal was sent via the new dock facilities at Immingham.

The temporary nationalisation of the coal industry during the hostilities of the Second World War, leading to full nationalisation in 1947, led to an end to the system of individual collieries selling direct to individual end customers, however different collieries produced different grades of coal, and domestic and industrial customers were still dotted at many locations throughout the country, and so Wath Yard was still needed to efficiently manage the coal traffic flows from the area. This was so much so, that in the early 1950s, the yard became one of the eastern ends of the Manchester-Sheffield-Wath electric railway, over the Woodhead route. A prime justification of this scheme was the heavy coal flows from Wath up the steep grades over the Pennines.

By the 1970s, the energy requirements of Britain's households and industry had changed. The Clean Air Act and North Sea gas meant that the number of domestic users of coal was dwindling, industry was now powered by electricity, and the centralisation of the power industry under the Central Electricity Generating Board meant that power was generated in a new fleet of large power stations rather small municipal generators. The remaining coal traffic was block-train rather than wagon-load and consequently did not require much marshalling: the coming of Merry-go-round trains for coal that travelled from colliery or dock to power station in a continuous cycle further reduced this need.

In 1981, the Woodhead route and the associated electrification system closed. Wath Yard was busy with coal trains for a few more years, but the impending closure of many of the remaining local collieries after the 1984-85 miners' strike resulted in a sudden decline. The western exit to Wombwell and Barnsley was lifted in 1986. The yard finally closed and was lifted in 1988 with the closure of the last of the local collieries.

The whole site of the yard was cleared in stages in the mid-1990s and is now an area of office, light industry and residential developments set around a lake which forms the Old Moor Wetland Centre RSPB reserve. When visiting today it is very difficult to detect that the area was once a large and busy railway marshalling yard.

== The yard ==
The yard was set to the south of the main line from Doncaster and Barnsley. It was built on the 'hump' principle, where trains were uncoupled and then propelled over a hump, allowing the wagons to run by gravity into sidings to await collection. However unlike later hump yards it was built without automatic retarders to slow the rolling wagons down. Instead the yard employed human runners who chased the rolling wagons to pin down their hand brakes and control their movement through the sidings. This was a particularly hazardous occupation.

With a total length of over 1¼ miles, between Wath Central railway station and Elsecar Junction, and with over 36 miles of track this was two yards in one: Eastbound traffic was received in eight reception sidings feeding 31 departure sidings and controlled by "B" Box, whilst for westbound traffic there was a fan of nine reception sidings, again feeding 31 departure sidings and controlled by "A" Box. The western entry/exit to the yard was under the control of Elsecar Junction signal box whilst the eastern end was controlled by Moor Road signal box, with additional control from the Wath Central signal box, which controlled the main lines through the yard and was situated by the station. The yard could handle as many as 5,000 wagons per day.

== The locomotive depot ==
Initially the yard did not have major locomotive stabling facilities: locomotives were provided by Mexborough shed. With the coming of the electrification a two-road engine shed was built to the north of the yard adjacent to the Moor Lane Bridge to stable the new electric locomotives. In 1963 the replacement of steam with diesel locomotives on the non-electrified lines in the area resulted in the closure of Mexborough shed: a small diesel depot was built on the site of the old turntable in the centre of Wath yard, although diesel locomotives were also stabled at the electric locomotive shed. This shed closed in 1983, after then a shunter was provided as a trip from Tinsley until closure. After closure of the depot and yard, the locomotive shed was for a few years the home of a toxic waste processing company, which resulted in a local protest movement being formed.

In a lane off Moor Road to the south of the yard was the 'power house', along with the Yard Master's and Inspectors Offices and the Yard Master's House. At the time of opening the points within the yard, controlled by "A" and "B" boxes, were controlled by electro-pneumatic power, this being extended to control points on the main line and signals. The compressed air was supplied from the 'power house' through a network of pipes running throughout the yard.

== Special locomotives ==
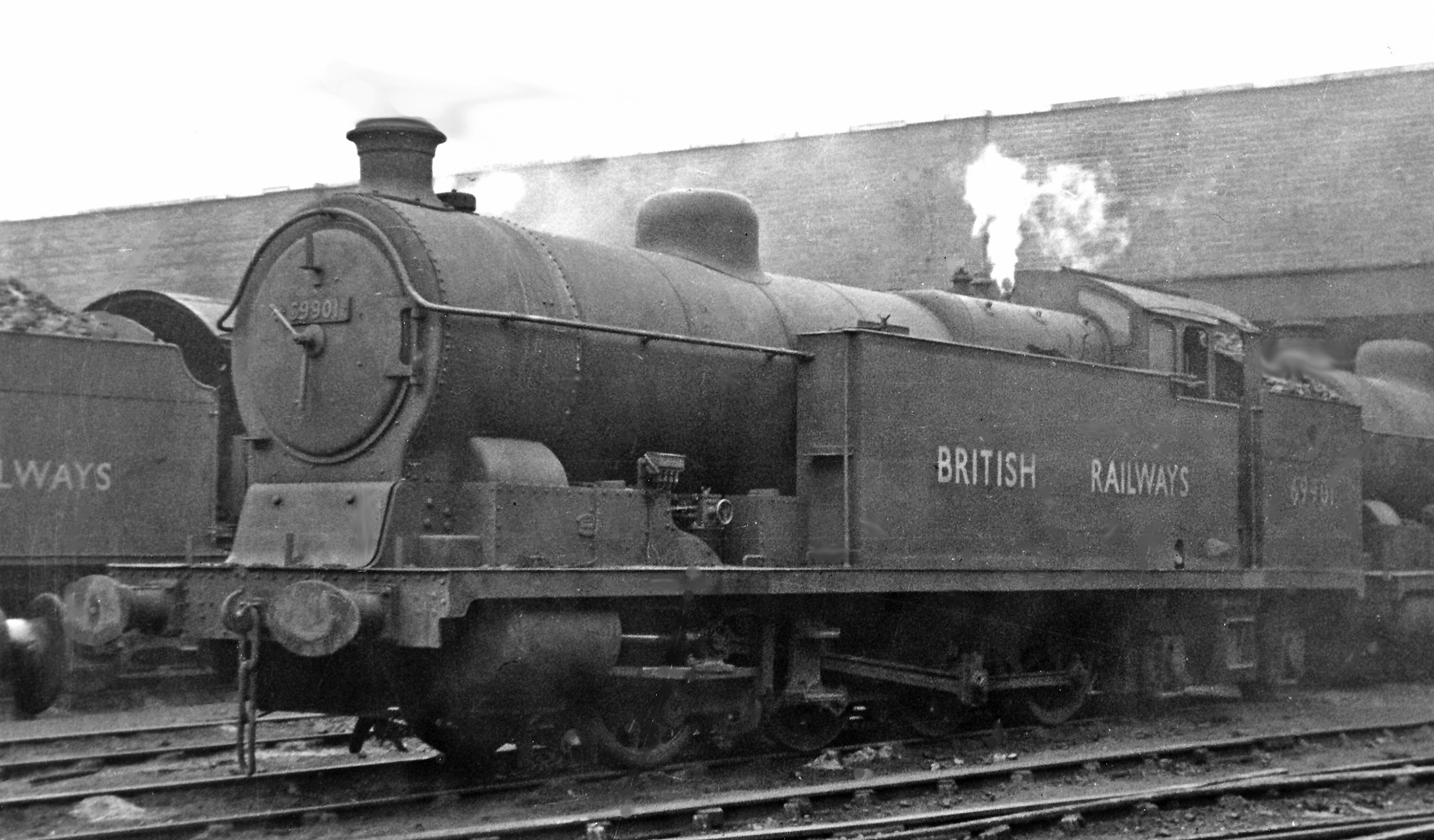
GCR Class 8H in 1949

To operate the yard special, powerful, locomotives were needed and the GCR developed a large, three-cylinder, 0-8-4T tank locomotive, four of which were built by Beyer, Peacock and Company, at Gorton Foundry, being delivered in December 1907 and January 1908. On delivery these were numbered 1170-1173, which in 1923 became L.N.E.R. 6170-6173. They were known as Wath Daisies, GCR Class 8H (LNER Class S1).
