= NS Class 1500 =

Dutch class of British electric locomotives

Class 1500
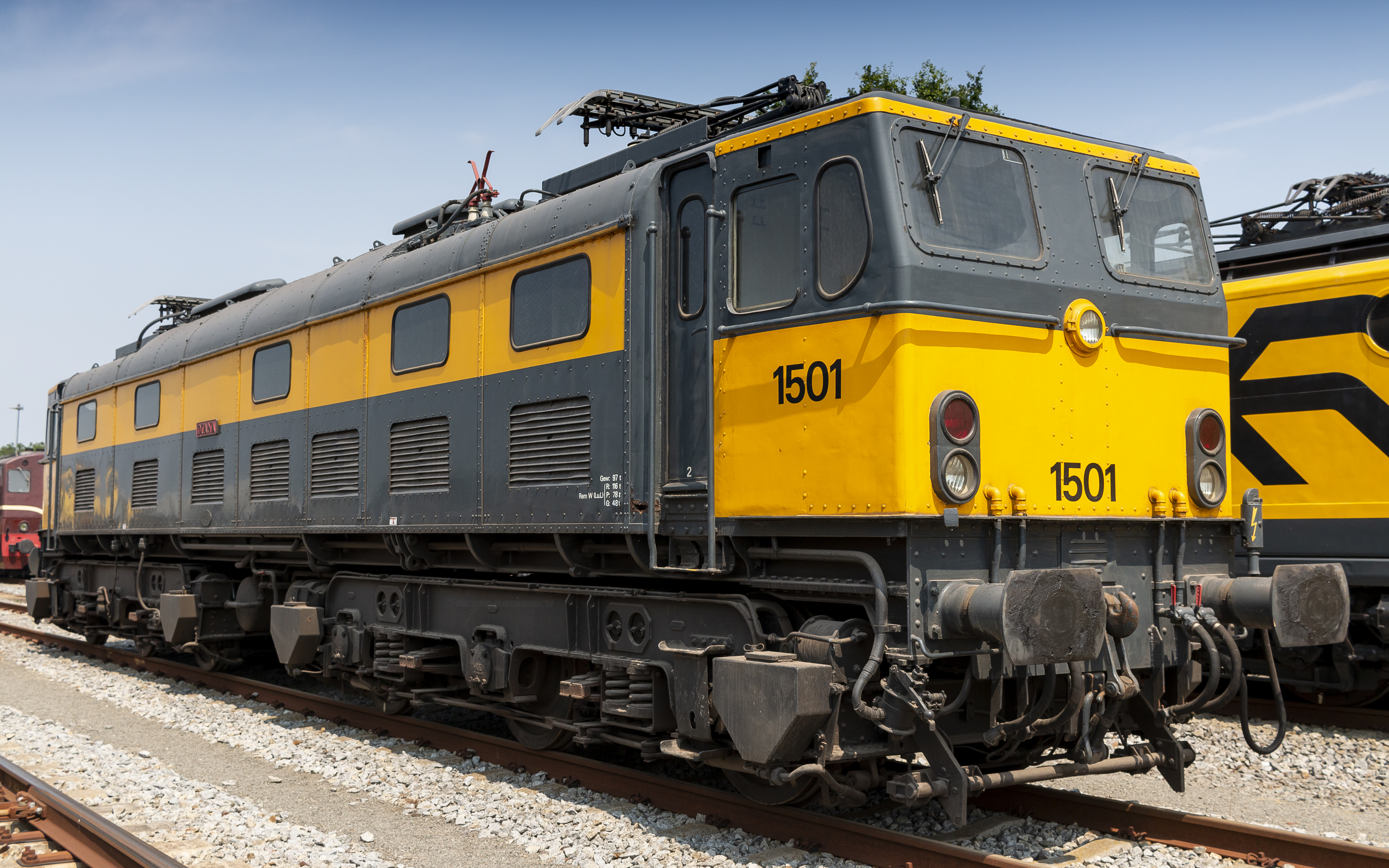
- Preserved locomotive no. 1501
Type and origin
- Power type: Electric 1500 V DC OHL
- Builder: Gorton Locomotive Works, Manchester, England
- Serial number: 1065-71
- Build date: 1953-1954
- Total produced: 7
Specifications
- Configuration
  - Commonwealth: Co-Co
- Gauge: 1,435 mm (4 ft 8 1/2 in) standard gauge
- Driver dia.: 1,092 mm (42.99 in)
- Loco weight: 102 t (100 long tons; 112 short tons)
- Electric system/s: 1.5 kV DC OHL
- Current pickup: Pantograph
- Loco brake: Air
- Train brakes: Air
Performance figures
- Tractive effort: 200 kN (45,000 lb_{f})
Career
- Operators: Nederlandse Spoorwegen
- Class: 1500
- Number in class: 6
- Numbers: 1501-1506 (Note: Previously E27000-6 with BR; one did not enter service with NS.)
- Delivered: 1969
- Disposition: 3 preserved, 4 scrapped

The NS Class 1500 electric locomotives were acquired by Nederlandse Spoorwegen in 1969, following a locomotive shortage, and operated until 1986. They were built by Gorton Works in Manchester, England, between 1953 and 1955. The locomotives were first operated by British Railways (BR) as Class EM2 (later Class 77), hauling passenger services on the Woodhead line between Manchester London Road and Sheffield Victoria until 1968.

== History ==
Seven were constructed; the bodies and bogies were manufactured at Gorton Works, with electrical equipment supplied by Metropolitan-Vickers and fitted at nearby Dukinfield.

They were withdrawn en masse in September 1968 by BR and were stored at Bury in the hope of sale to a foreign railway. Around this time, NS had been suffering from a shortage of electric locomotives. In August 1969, Dutch officials inspected no. E27002, which then performed a test run between Sheffield and Reddish Electric Depot, where they had been based. NS subsequently purchased all seven locomotives.

The class was shipped by ferry to the Netherlands in September 1969, from Harwich International Port to Port of Zeebrugge. They were then tripped to Tilburg workshops for assessment and repairs. One locomotive, no. E27005 Minerva, was considered to be beyond economical repair and was broken up consequently for spare parts. The remaining six locomotives entered the workshops for various modifications, including the fitting of Dutch headlight clusters, new single-arm pantographs (Note: They had been equipped previously with double-armed diamond pantographs.) and a new braking system. Driving controls were also relocated from the left side of the cab to the right. They were renumbered in the 1500 series in the order they left their workshops, starting with E27003 as 1501 in May 1970 and ending with E27002 as 1506 in June 1971.

The 1500s were primarily used on services in the southern part of the Netherlands. Typical passenger duty was Den Haag to Venlo. Freight duties were mainly operated at night and included the Rotterdam Kijfhoek freight yard to Roosendaal route.

By the early 1980s, new electric locomotives in the form of Class 1600 were being introduced. The 1500s were therefore made obsolete and withdrawals started in 1985; the final locomotives were withdrawn in 1986.

Two were repatriated to England for preservation. In May 1989, 1502 returned to the Netherlands for the NS 150th celebrations, operating a number of tours.

== Fleet details ==
Key:	Preserved	Scrapped

NS number	BR number		Name	Disposal
NS number	1955	1957	Name	Disposal
1501	27003	E27003	Diana	Preserved at the Utrecht Railway Museum
1502	27000	E27000	Electra	Preserved at Midland Railway - Butterley, England
1503	27004	E27004	Juno	Scrapped (10/1986)
1504	27006	E27006	Pandora	Scrapped (02/1985)
1505	27001	E27001	Ariadne	Preserved at the Science & Industry Museum, Manchester, England
1506	27002	E27002	Aurora	Scrapped (02/1985)
-	27005	E27005	Minerva	Used for spare parts by NS. Scrapped (11/1969)
