= Gorton Locomotive Works =

Railway workshops in Gorton, Manchester, England

Coordinates: 53°28′13″N 2°10′20″W

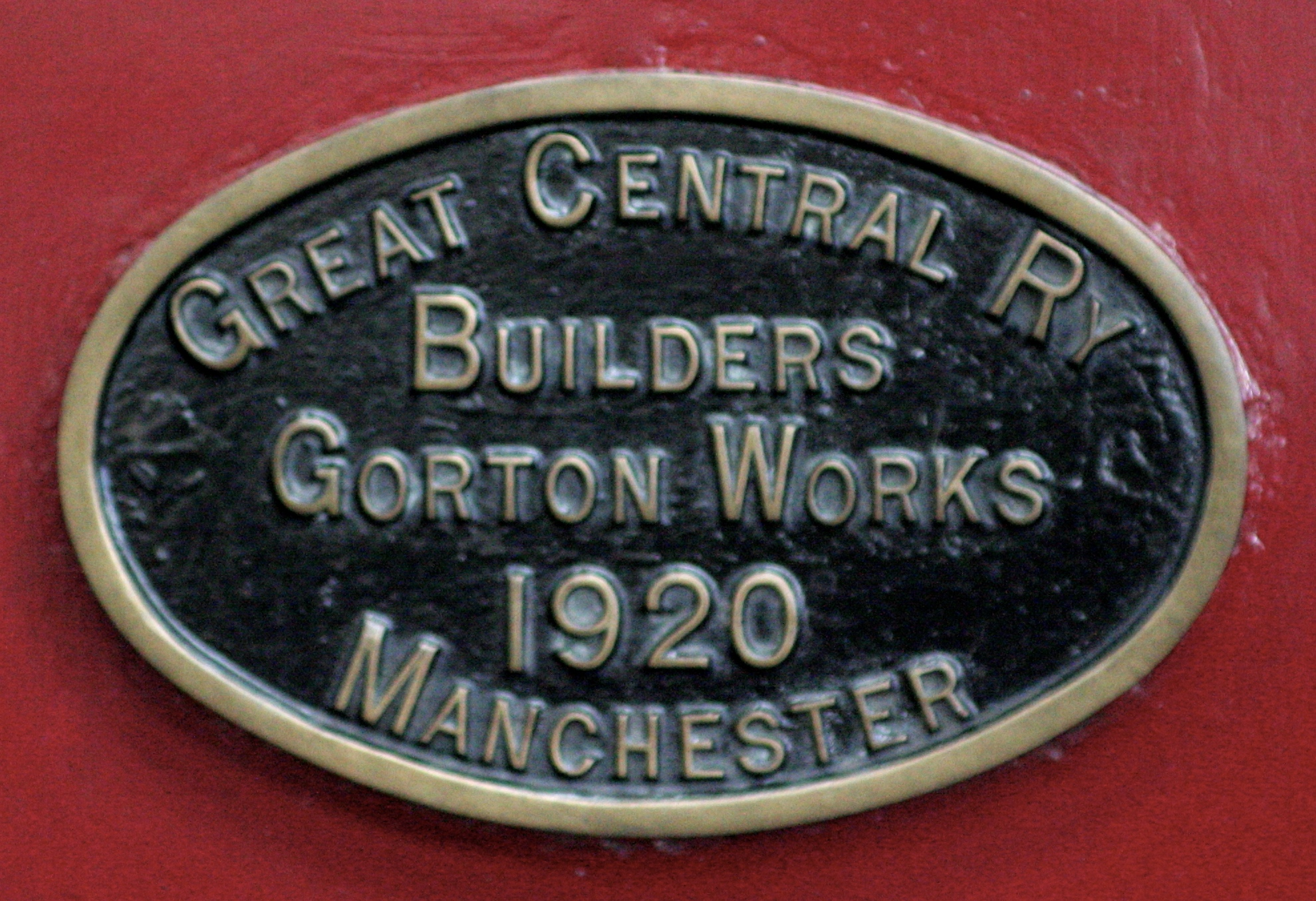
Gorton Works works plate from a GCR Class 11F locomotive

Gorton Locomotive Works, known locally as Gorton Tank, was in West Gorton in Manchester, England and was completed in 1848 by the Sheffield, Ashton-under-Lyne and Manchester Railway.

== History ==
The original workshops of the Sheffield, Ashton-under-Lyne and Manchester Railway were in Newton near Hyde in Cheshire but were inconveniently situated, cramped and makeshift. In 1845 the railway asked their locomotive superintendent, Richard Peacock, to find a more suitable site for a locomotive and carriage and wagon works. The site selected was two and a half miles east of Manchester at the side of the railway line between the Manchester to Guide Bridge. Peacock was responsible for the planning and design of the works, which at the time of completion covered about 20 acres (81,000 m^{2}), and eventually growing to 30 acres (120,000 m^{2}). By the time the works were completed in 1848 the railway had become the Manchester, Sheffield & Lincolnshire Railway.

The original motive power depot at Gorton, in the form of a roundhouse, was unique in that it had two roads instead of the customary one with a pillar in the centre supporting the glazed roof. It was later replaced by a larger facility but was converted to a smithy. The locomotive workshops were next to the roundhouse on its Western side, with the carriage and wagon shops and a paint shop on the other side of the loco shops. A reservoir was constructed by the nearby Ashton Canal.

Richard Peacock left the Manchester, Sheffield & Lincolnshire Railway in 1854 and with Charles Beyer founded the Beyer Peacock locomotive company at Gorton Foundry, directly opposite Gorton Works on the southern side of the railway line. He was replaced by William Grindley Craig, who served until 1859, followed by Charles Sacré until 1886. Between 1871 and 1880 the works was unable to keep pace with new construction and repairs; Gorton therefore manufactured new parts for locomotives that were constructed or renewed at the Sheffield running shed.

In 1880 Sacré's Carriage and Wagon Superintendent, Thomas Parker, oversaw the construction of new carriage and wagon shops on the site, enabling the original shops to be converted into an enlarged erecting shop the following year. Following Sacré's retirement in 1889, Parker took over as Locomotive Superintendent until his own retirement in 1893. He was responsible for the construction of a new machine shop and stores in 1889, and the enlargement of the motive power depot to accommodate 120 locomotives.

Parker was succeeded by Harry Pollitt, who served until 1900. During this time the Manchester, Sheffield & Lincolnshire Railway changed its name to the Great Central Railway following the opening of its London extension to Marylebone station. Pollitt was succeeded by John G. Robinson as Locomotive and Marine Superintendent in 1900 and was appointed Chief Mechanical Engineer in 1902.

Under Robinson, new erecting shops were built, and the old erecting shop (the original carriage and wagon shops) were converted into machine and fitting shops; the construction of a new carriage and wagon works at Dukinfield in 1910 enabled additional locomotive work to be carried out in the former carriage and wagon shops.

=== Grouping and nationalisation ===
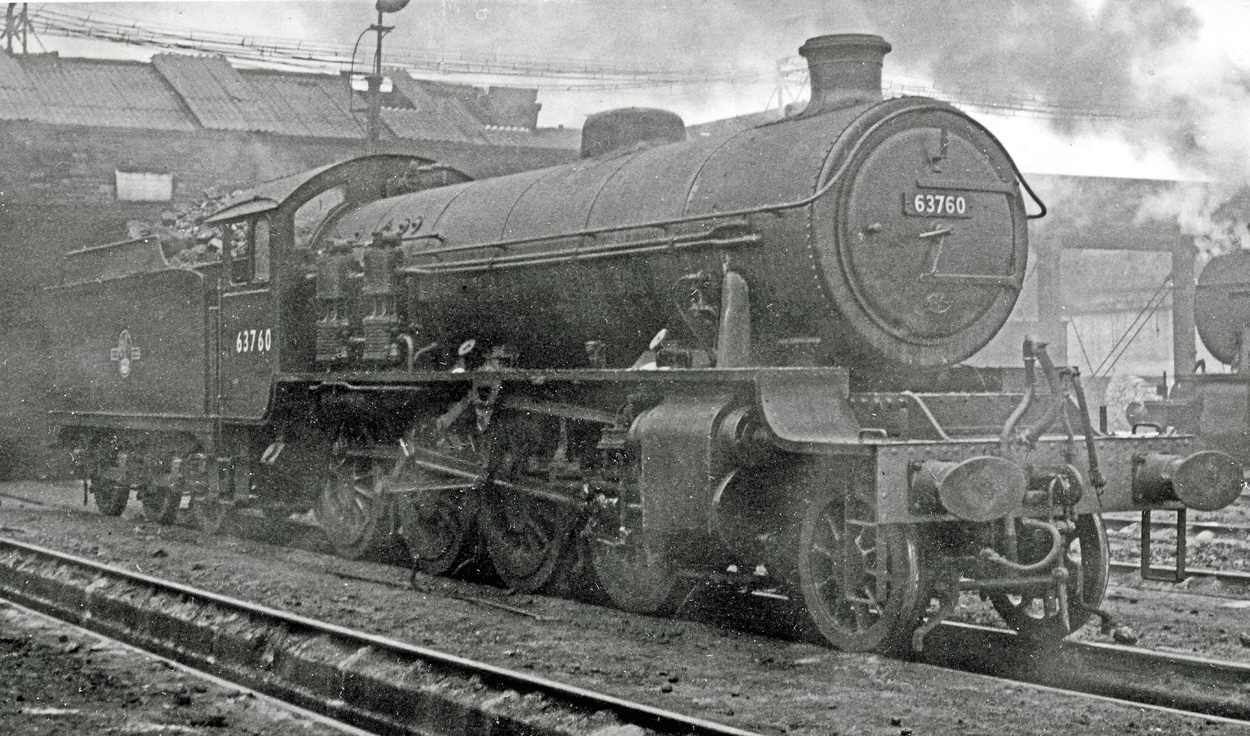
Thompson LNER Class O1 2-8-0 loco 63760 at Gorton on 8 November 1958 after overhaul in the works. This loco is fitted with air pumps in front of the cab for working heavy iron ore trains from Tyne Dock to Consett steel works

Following the merger of the Great Central Railway and other railways in eastern England and Scotland to form the London and North Eastern Railway as a result of the Railways Act grouping of 1923, most new locomotive design and construction moved to the larger facilities at Doncaster and Darlington Works. Between the 1930s and late 1950s, Gorton Works mainly concentrated on repair and modification of locomotives and manufacture of parts. Locomotives were from throughout the LNER system. British Railways scrapped many locomotives at the works during the run-down of steam in the 1950s and early 1960s Beeching era. The workforce remained large: even in the 1960s the number of men employed at Gorton Works was large enough to sustain nine public houses in nearby Ogden Lane.

=== Closure ===
The railway works were closed 31 May 1963 following a reorganisation of railway workshops. Work was transferred to Doncaster. The motive power depot was closed in 1965. A wholesale fruit and vegetable market (New Smithfield Market), a police motor vehicle garage, and a cash-and-carry warehouse now stand on the site. The folk comedy group Gorton Tank were based in Gorton and were popular in the Manchester area.

== Locomotive construction at Gorton ==
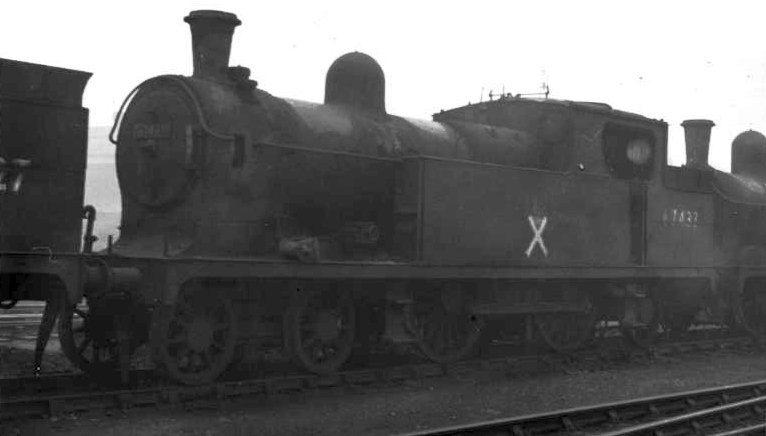
GCR Class 9K (LNER Class C13) 4-4-2T 67433 was built by the GCR at Gorton works in 1905. Photo at Gorton on 8 November 1958 shortly before scrapping in the works

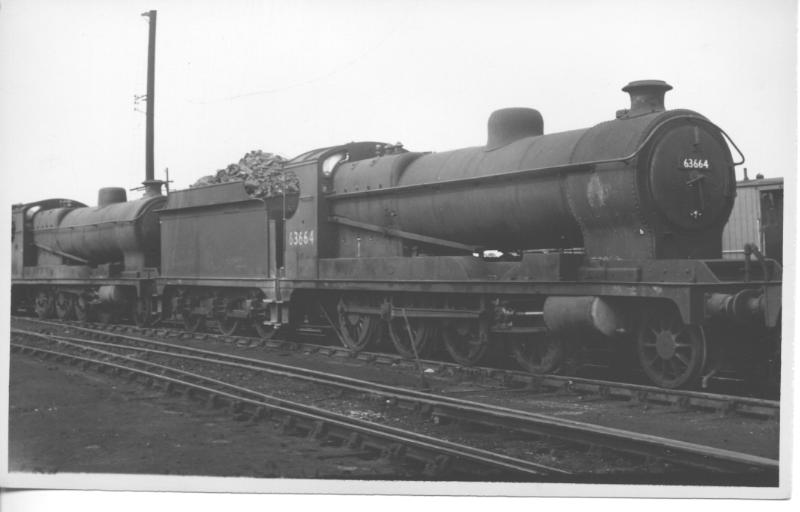
63664 was a GCR Robinson Class 8K (LNER Class O4/1) 2-8-0 loco built at Gorton works in 1912. Photo at Langwith Junction in service on 7 August 1960

Locomotive building began at Gorton under Craig in 1858 with the completion of 0-6-0 No. 6 Archimedes. Over the next sixty years the works constructed many of the MS&LR and GCR locomotives, including Parker and Sacré 2-4-0 and 0-6-0 freight classes and several of the Robinson 4-6-0 and 4-4-0 express passenger and mixed traffic classes. The 500th locomotive was GCR Class 11A (LNER Class D6) 4-4-0 No.858.

From 1911, the works constructed 130 of Robinson's GCR Class 8K (later O4) 2-8-0 heavy freight locomotives. During the First World War the design was adopted by the War Department's Railway Operating Division (ROD) for use in continental Europe. Six of the ROD 2-8-0s were built at Gorton in 1918 and 1919, with the remainder of 521 engines being built by private locomotive manufacturers, including 369 from the North British Locomotive Company in Glasgow.

By the end of Great Central Railway ownership in December 1922, 921 steam locomotives had been built at Gorton Works. This figure had reached 1006 by 1951, when the last steam locomotive, a LNER Thompson Class B1 4-6-0 no. 61349 was completed.

Following the nationalisation of British Railways (BR) in 1948, Gorton was used for the construction of 64 electric locomotives of Class 76 and Class 77, between 1950 and 1954, which were required for the newly electrified Woodhead Line from Manchester London Road to Sheffield Victoria. Overhauls of these locomotives were carried out at Gorton. After closure in 1963, this work transferred to Crewe Works.

== Preservation ==
=== Australia ===
- ROD 2-8-0 J&A Brown 23 (Ex-ROD 2004, Gorton built 1919) is preserved at the Richmond Vale Railway Museum in Kurri Kurri, New South Wales, Australia.
- ROD 2-8-0 J&A Brown 24 (Ex-ROD 2003, Gorton built 1919) is preserved at the Dorrigo Steam Railway and Museum in Dorrigo, New South Wales, Australia.

=== Netherlands ===
- NS Class 1500 No. 1501 (ex-British Rail 27003) is preserved at the Utrecht Railway Museum by Werkgroep 1501.

=== United Kingdom ===
- GCR Class 8K 63601 (EX-GCR 102, Gorton built 1911) is preserved at the Great Central Railway in Loughborough, Leicestershire.
- GCR Class 11F 506 Butler Henderson (Gorton built 1920) is preserved at Barrow Hill Engine Shed in Barrow Hill, Derbyshire.
- British Rail Class 76 No. 26020 is preserved at the National Railway Museum.
- British Rail Class 77 No. 27000 is preserved at the Midland Railway - Butterley.
- British Rail Class 77 No. 27001 is preserved at the Manchester Museum of Science and Industry.
