= Newton, Greater Manchester =

Area of Hyde, Greater Manchester, England

Coordinates: 53.460°N 2.090°W

Newton
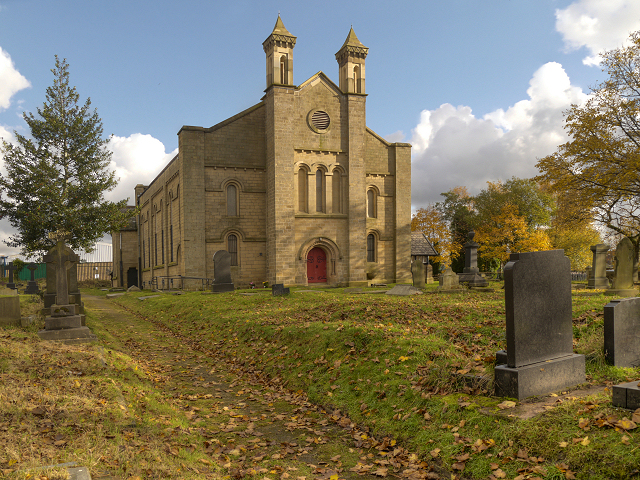
- St Mary's Church, Newton

- Location within Greater Manchester
- Metropolitan borough: Tameside
- Metropolitan county: Greater Manchester
- Region: North West
- Country: England
- Sovereign state: United Kingdom
- Post town: HYDE
- Postcode district: SK14
- Dialling code: 0161
- Police: Greater Manchester
- Fire: Greater Manchester
- Ambulance: North West
- UK Parliament: Stalybridge and Hyde

Newton is an area of Hyde, in the Tameside district, in Greater Manchester, England; it occupies a narrow strip of land from the River Tame, near Newton Hall, to Matley, between Hyde and Dukinfield.

Newton can be divided into four separate parts:

- Newton Green
- Flowery Field
- Newton Moor
- Newton

The former site of Shaw Hall factory lies on Matley Lane.

== Governance ==
There is one main tier of local government covering Newton, at metropolitan borough level: Tameside Metropolitan Borough Council. The council is a member of the Greater Manchester Combined Authority, which is led by the directly-elected Mayor of Greater Manchester. The Hyde Newton electoral ward is named after Newton.

For national elections, the Hyde Newton ward is part of the Stalybridge and Hyde constituency.

=== Administrative history ===
Newton was historically a township in the ancient parish of Mottram-in-Longdendale, which formed part of the Macclesfield Hundred of Cheshire. From the 17th century onwards, parishes were gradually given various civil functions under the poor laws, in addition to their original ecclesiastical functions. In some cases, including Mottram-in-Longdendale, the civil functions were exercised by each township separately rather than the parish as a whole. In 1866, the legal definition of 'parish' was changed to be the areas used for administering the poor laws, and so Newton became a civil parish.

In terms of ecclesiastical parishes, Newton was separated from Mottram-in-Longdendale in 1841, following the construction of St Mary's Church the previous year.

In 1871, the Newton township or civil parish was converted into a local government district, administered by an elected local board. The district was also known as Newton Moor and was abolished just six years later in 1877, when the area was absorbed into the Hyde local government district. The Hyde local government district was raised to the status of a municipal borough in 1881.

Newton continued to exist as an urban parish within the borough of Hyde until 1923, when all the parishes within the borough were merged into a single civil parish called Hyde. At the 1921 census (the last before the parish was abolished), Newton had a population of 7,715.

The borough of Hyde was abolished in 1974 under the Local Government Act 1972. The area became part of the Metropolitan Borough of Tameside in Greater Manchester.

== Transport ==
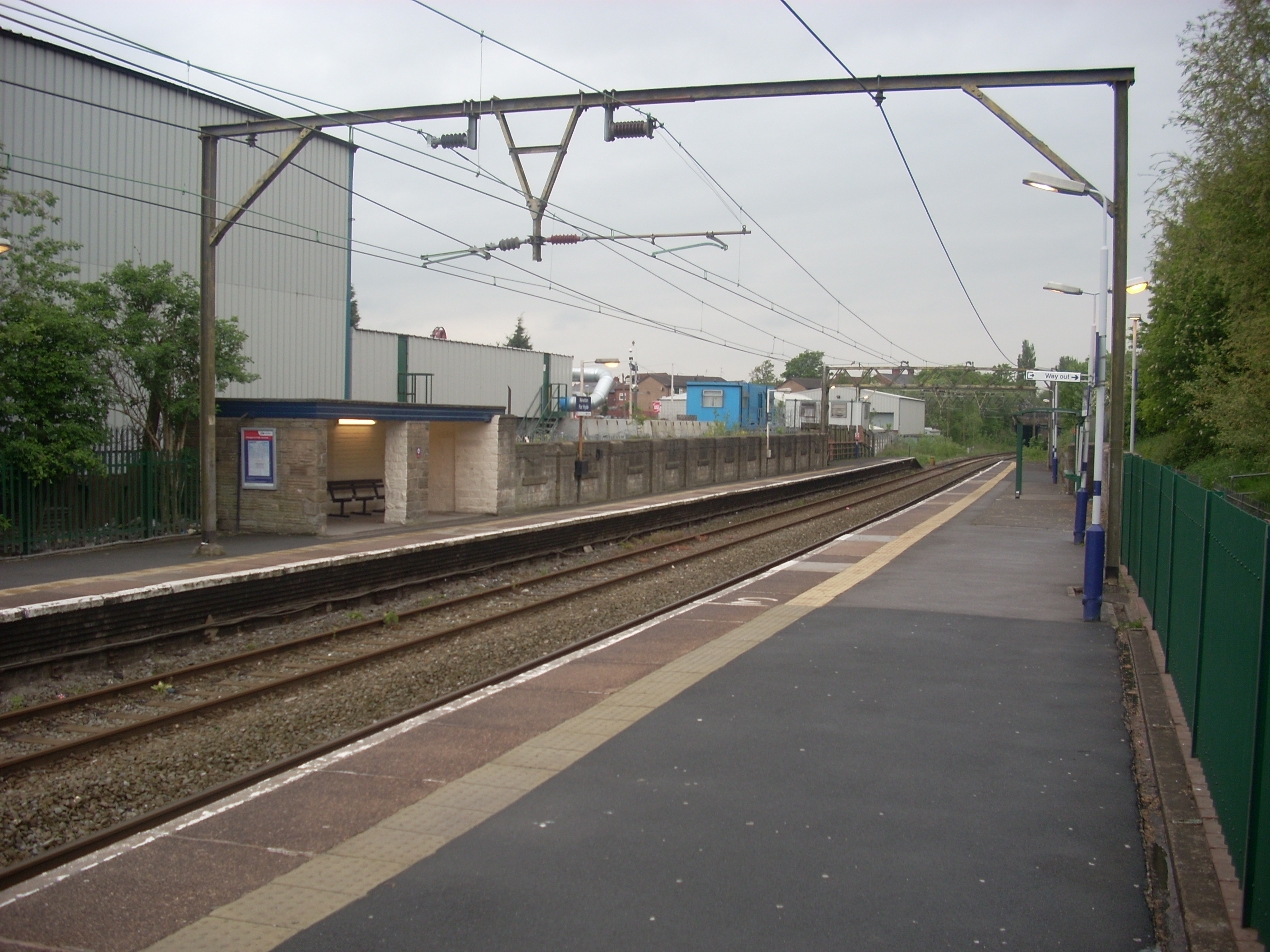
Newton for Hyde station

The area is served by two railway stations: Newton for Hyde and Flowery Field; both are stops on the Glossop Line between Manchester Piccadilly, Glossop and Hadfield. Services are operated by Northern Trains.

The main bus route in the area is the 346, which links Hyde with Ashton-Under-Lyne; it is operated by Stagecoach Manchester.

== Education ==
Newton is served by the following primary and secondary schools:

- Bradley Green Primary School
- Flowery Field Primary School
- Oakfield Primary School
- St Paul's Catholic Primary & Nursery School
- Hyde Community College

== Notable people ==
- Michael Barber (1934 - 1991), chemist and mass spectrometrist, best known for his invention of fast atom bombardment ionisation; born at 166 Lodge Lane in Newton
