= Hattersley (disambiguation) =

Hattersley is a neighbourhood in Greater Manchester, England.

Hattersley may also refer to:

- Hattersley (surname)
- Hattersley loom, in weaving
- Hattersley railway station, England (opened 1978)
