= Glossop line =

Railway line in Greater Manchester and Derbyshire, England

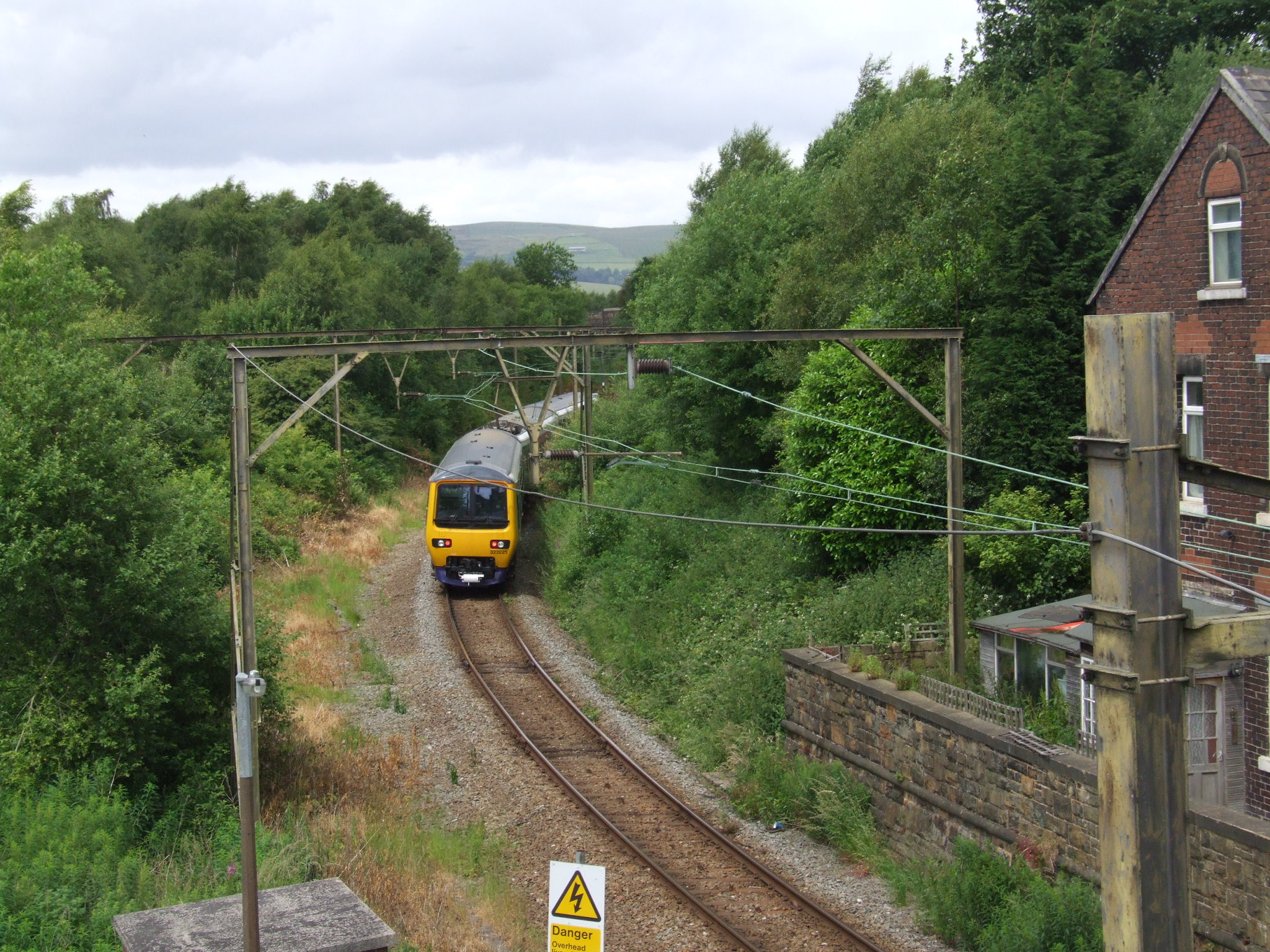
- A Northern Rail Class 323 electric multiple unit rounds a curve near Dinting in 2008

Overview
- Status: Operational
- Owner: Network Rail
- Locale: East Midlands; North West England
- Termini: Manchester Piccadilly; Glossop
- Stations: 13

Service
- Type: Heavy rail
- System: National Rail
- Operator: Northern Trains
- Depot: Longsight Electric TMD
- Rolling stock: Class 323

Technical
- Number of tracks: Double track
- Character: Suburban rail
- Track gauge: 4 ft 8 1/2 in (1,435 mm) standard gauge
- Electrification: 25 kV 50 Hz AC OHLE
Route map
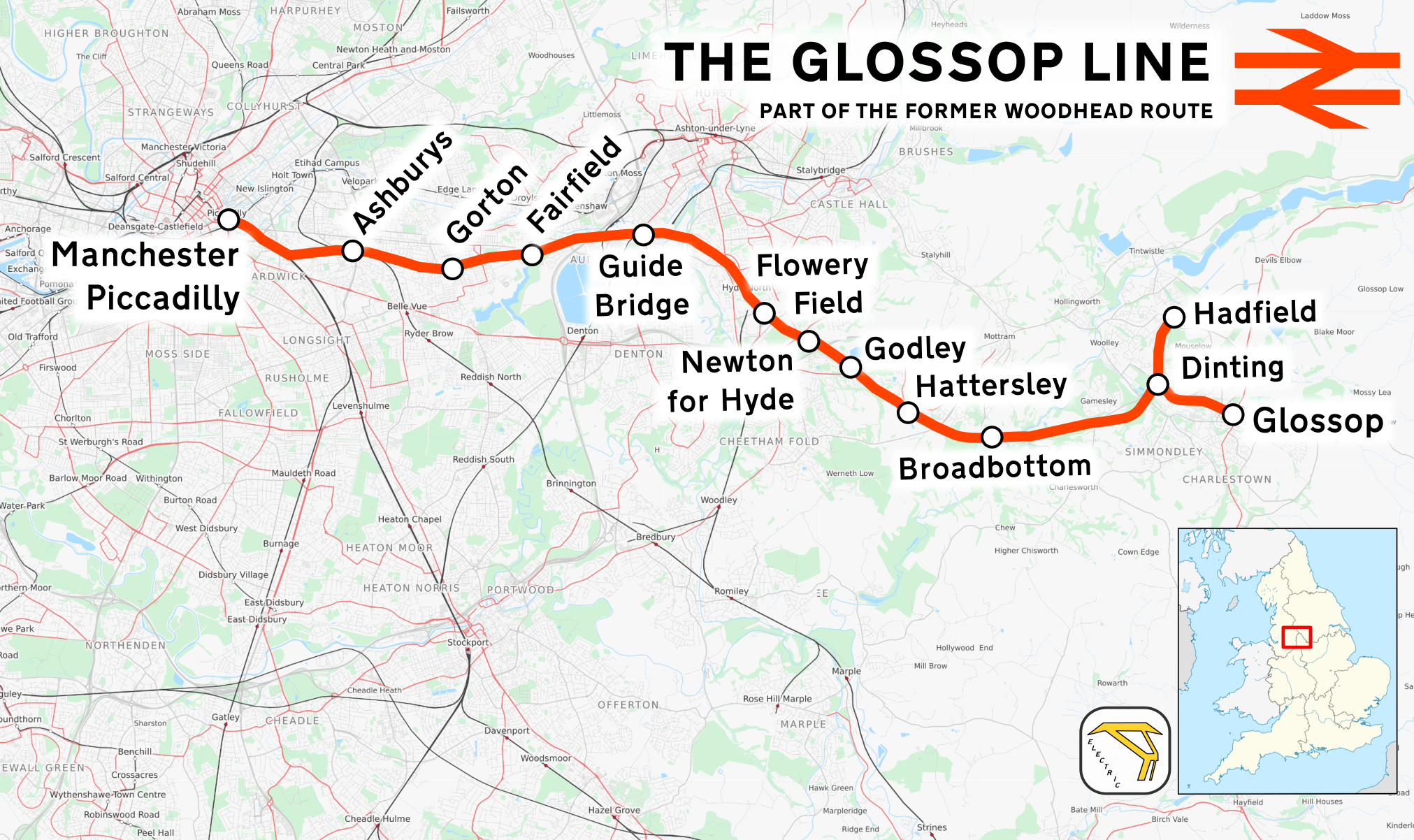
(Click to expand)

The Glossop line is a railway line connecting the city of Manchester with the towns of Hadfield and Glossop in Derbyshire, England. It formed part of the historic Great Central Main Line between Manchester Piccadilly and Sheffield Victoria. Passenger services on the line are operated by Northern Trains.

== History ==
The line is the surviving section, west of the Pennines, of the Woodhead Line, which was electrified in the early 1950s; passenger services east of Hadfield were withdrawn in 1970, followed by complete closure of the line in 1981.

Hattersley was opened in 1978, around 750 metres (820 yd) east of the then Godley station site, to serve the 1960s Hattersley estate. In 1985, the Flowery Field and new Godley stations were built; this new Godley site is around 500m west of the original Godley station, then renamed Godley East. These two stations, along with Ryder Brow on the Hope Valley Line, were built to a minimum standard, using hollow wooden structures compared the more grandiose stonework of original stations, like Newton for Hyde or Glossop. Godley East was then closed in 1986, effectively being replaced by the newer Godley and Hattersley stations.

In December 1984, the Manchester–Glossop/Hadfield line electrification was converted from 1500 V DC to 25 kV AC. Class 303 EMUs took over from the veteran Class 506 units. The 303s later returned to the Glasgow area and were, in turn, replaced by Class 304 and Class 305 units before the then-new Class 323 units were introduced to the line in November 1997. These units were due to transfer to the West Midlands in 2017 to be replaced by four car units, and as these trains were longer, platform extensions at Godley and Flowery Field were carried out in the late 2010s. Network Rail plans to further lengthen platforms to support six carriage Class 331/0 units by 2043.

After Manchester Piccadilly, the busiest station on the line is Glossop, followed by Hadfield and Guide Bridge.

== Route ==
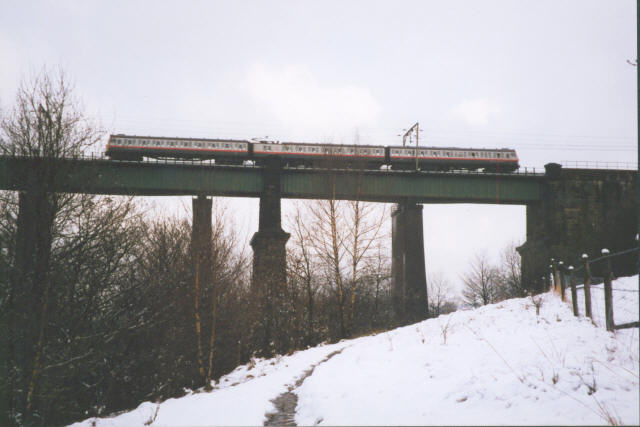
A Class 304 in Greater Manchester PTE livery crossing Dinting Viaduct in 1994

The following table summarises the line's thirteen stations, their distance measured from Manchester Piccadilly and estimated number of passenger entries/exits in 2019/20:

Station	Location	Local authority	Mileage	Patronage
Manchester Piccadilly	Manchester city centre	City of Manchester	0	32.199 m
Ashburys	Openshaw	City of Manchester	1.61	0.129 m
Gorton	Gorton	City of Manchester	2.81	0.126 m
Fairfield	Fairfield	Tameside	3.72	43,316
Guide Bridge	Audenshaw	Tameside	5.02	0.386 m
Flowery Field	Flowery Field	Tameside	6.8	0.253 m
Newton for Hyde	Newton	Tameside	7.4	0.210 m
Godley	Godley	Tameside	8.1	0.107 m
Hattersley	Hattersley	Tameside	8.8	0.110 m
Broadbottom	Broadbottom	Tameside	9.8	0.202 m
Dinting	Dinting	High Peak	11.9	0.163 m
Hadfield	Hadfield	High Peak	12.6	0.397 m
Glossop	Glossop	High Peak	12.9	1.129 m

The same train serves Glossop and Hadfield via one of three routings:

Routing	In use
Dinting–Hadfield–Glossop–Dinting	Morning peak services
Dinting–Glossop–Hadfield–Dinting	Evening peak services
Dinting–Glossop–Hadfield–Glossop–Dinting	All other times

During the autumn "leaf fall" timetable, this pattern is modified so that the morning rush hour pattern is extended to about midday and the evening rush hour pattern starts as soon as the morning rush hour pattern finishes.

The line also includes a closed station at Godley East. This station was originally Godley Junction and was renamed Godley when the line to Stockport Tiviot Dale, via Woodley, was closed. The station became Godley East when the current Godley station was built slightly west in the 1980s.

There are also remnants of a platform and shelter near Gamesley, between Broadbottom and Dinting. Known as Mottram Staff Halt, it served the former Mottram Goods Yard.

== Future proposals ==
Network Rail's Route 20 NW Urban Route Plan 2008 suggested the following improvements for 2009–2014 (Control Period 4) and 2014+ (Control Period 5). Potentially introduce a new Piccadilly – Stalybridge service, helping the Hadfield/Glossop service to achieve better utilisation and consequently avoid excessive platform lengthening.

Other potential changes include raising the linespeed around Dinting triangle from the present 10 mph-40 mph to 10 mph-50 mph, and the linespeed from Guide Bridge to Dinting from 60 mph to "up to 90 mph". Raising the linespeed will help the same number of units to work a 4tph (train per hour) service when they currently can only work 3 TPH, and incidentally avoids platform lengthening that would otherwise be necessary. New turnback facility would be provided (with associated OHLE works) in the Broadbottom/Gamesley area.

A new facility to stable 20 vehicles at Guide Bridge, will be required for new vehicles to arrive as part of the DfT Rolling Stock Plan.

=== Metrolink ===
In the early 1980s, proposals were put forward to convert the Glossop line to light rail operation for the proposed Manchester Metrolink system. While construction of Metrolink went ahead, the Glossop line was not included in the system. In November 2013 the Greater Manchester Combined Authority approved a recommended strategy for reconfiguring existing commuter services into tram-train operation; identifying the Glossop line as potentially suitable for conversion within Phase 2 of the tram-train strategy.

== See also ==
- Manchester–Sheffield–Wath electric railway
- Audenshaw Junction rail accident
