= Godley East railway station =

Former railway station in Greater Manchester, England

Coordinates: 53.4486°N 2.0495°W

Godley East
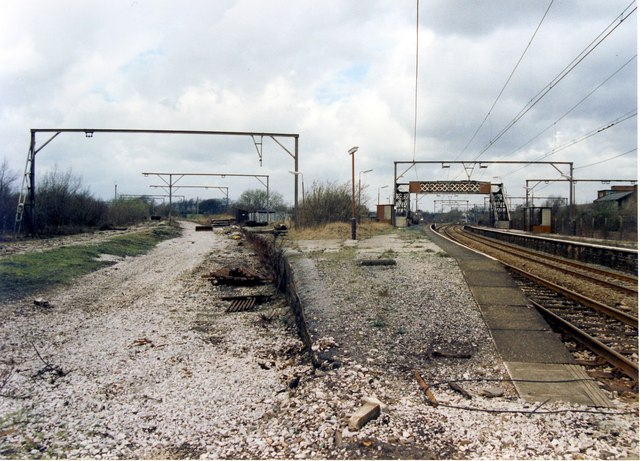
- The station's remains in 1989.

General information
- Location: Godley, Tameside, England
- Grid reference: SJ968946
- Platforms: 4

Other information
- Status: Disused

History
- Original company: Sheffield, Ashton-under-Lyne and Manchester Railway (first station), Manchester, Sheffield and Lincolnshire Railway (second station)
- Pre-grouping: Great Central Railway
- Post-grouping: London and North Eastern Railway

Key dates
- 17 November 1841: Godley Toll Bar opened
- 11 December 1842: Closed
- 1 February 1866: Godley Junction opened
- 6 May 1974: Renamed Godley
- 7 July 1986: Renamed Godley East
- 27 May 1995: Closed
Location

Godley East was a railway station on the Woodhead Line; it served the Godley area of Hyde, in Tameside, Greater Manchester, England.

== Early history ==
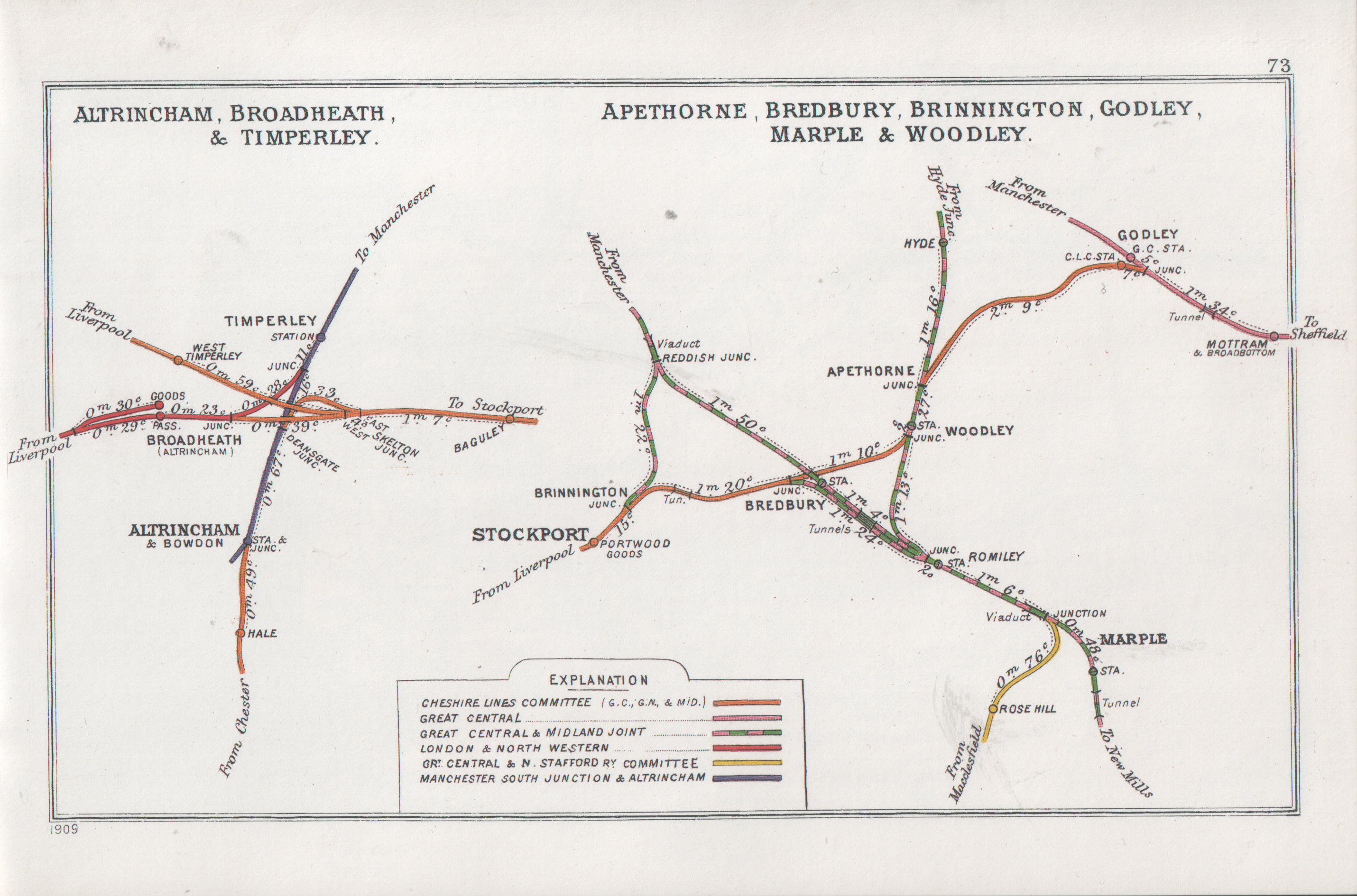
Early 1900s junction diagram, showing the layout at Godley with the then extant stations

On 17 November 1841, Godley was the temporary terminus of the Sheffield, Ashton-under-Lyne and Manchester Railway's (SAuLMR) Woodhead Line from Manchester Store Street. The station was located close to the Hyde and Mottram Road and was sometimes referred to as Godley Toll Bar. It closed on 11 December 1842 when the line was extended to Broadbottom. A permanent station was opened after the Cheshire Lines Committee (CLC) opened the Stockport, Timperley and Altrincham Junction Railway as far as Broadheath on 1 February 1866 and the SAuLMR, by now renamed the Manchester, Sheffield and Lincolnshire Railway (MS&LR), opened a line from Woodley to Godley via Apethorne Junction.

The station, which was named Godley Junction, had four platform faces: two on the Manchester line and two on the CLC route. The CLC platforms were only ever used lightly. The station and sidings were controlled by a single mechanical signal box which was located at the east end of the 'up' (Hadfield) platform.

The connection to Woodley gave the MS&LR access to the Port of Liverpool without the need to go via Manchester. This resulted in Godley becoming the point where freight traffic from as far away as Merseyside met with traffic going to and fro over the Pennines. Exchange sidings were laid on both the MS&LR and the CLC sides of the station; those on the CLC side were known as Brookfold Sidings. Brookfold Sidings had their own turntable and signal box. A CLC traffic office was based at Godley and, during the Second World War, the London and North Eastern Railway had an operational headquarters at the rear of the up main line platform which controlled operations as far east as Wath and Doncaster.

Preceding station	Historical railways	Following station
Newton for Hyde; Line and station open	Manchester, Sheffield and Lincolnshire Railway; Woodhead Line	Broadbottom; Line and station open
Woodley; Line closed, station open	Cheshire Lines Committee via Apethorne Junction	Broadbottom; Line and station open

== Electrification ==
The electrification of the Woodhead line in 1954 gave Godley a strategic importance, as it was the point where steam and then diesel workings over the former CLC system met with electric services via Woodhead. A traction change-over siding was installed and loops on each side of the line ran from Godley Junction to a point 700 yards (640 m) to the east. These loops were controlled by their own signal box known as Godley East.

On 1 April 1969, the turntable was taken out of use. The station was renamed from Godley Junction to Godley on 6 May 1974.

By the late 1970s, traffic had declined on the Woodhead line and the sidings at Godley had become overgrown. Nearby, Manchester City Council erected high-rise housing estates which were served by a newly-opened station at Hattersley. On 20 July 1981, the connection to Woodley closed along with the Woodhead line between Hadfield and Penistone. Track lifting followed in 1985–6.

== Closure ==
On 7 July 1986, a new station called Godley was opened on the site of the original Godley Toll Bar station, and the original station was renamed Godley East. Thereafter, a parliamentary train ran to Godley East on Saturdays only: the 12:38 Hadfield to Manchester Piccadilly service. The station formally closed on 27 May 1995.

== The site today ==
The main platforms remain intact, although largely overgrown. Those on the Hadfield line are fenced off and the remains of the other platforms are visible from the shared-use path, which now runs along the former trackbed from Apethorne Junction. The derelict footbridge was removed during the late 2000s.

The turntable pit is still extant; it remains in remarkably good condition and free of debris.
