= Hyde High School =

Location
- Old Road; Flowery Field; Hyde, Greater Manchester, SK14 4SP; England; 53.4587°N 2.0832°W

Information
- Type: Community school
- Local authority: Tameside Council
- Department for Education URN: 106268 Tables
- Ofsted: Reports
- Headteacher: Georgina Arnold
- Gender: Co-educational
- Age: 11 to 16
- Enrolment: 1,094 as of April 2022
- Colours: Blue, white, black, red
- Website: http://www.hydehighschool.uk/

Hyde High School is a co-educational secondary school located in the Flowery Field area of Hyde in the English county of Greater Manchester.

It is a community school administered by Tameside Metropolitan Borough Council, and offers GCSEs and BTECs as programmes of study for pupils.

The school was previously awarded Technology College status, and was named Hyde Technology School for a time before the new school building opened in 2012 as Hyde Community College. In 2016, the school closed its sixth form provision and was renamed Hyde High School. The school continues to expand, with a high demand for school places in the local area.

On 1 April 2025, the school joined the Tame River Educational Trust, and is now an academy.

== Controversy ==
A pro-Palestinian demonstration was organised by the Palestine Solidarity Campaign, following allegations made against the school and its staff.
