= Broadbottom railway station =

Railway station in Greater Manchester, England

Coordinates: 53.4408°N 2.0165°W

Broadbottom
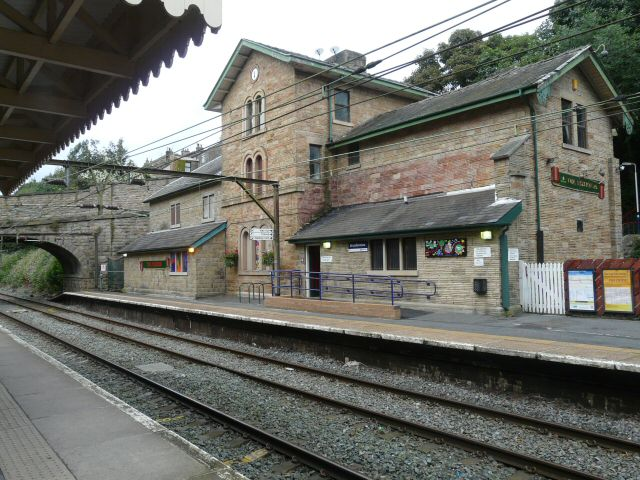
- Broadbottom railway station in 2008

General information
- Location: Broadbottom, Tameside; England
- Grid reference: SJ989937
- Managed by: Northern Trains
- Transit authority: Transport for Greater Manchester
- Platforms: 2

Other information
- Station code: BDB
- Classification: DfT category E

Passengers
- 2020/21: ▼35,400
- 2021/22: ▲99,086
- 2022/23: ▲0.103 million
- 2023/24: ▲0.120 million
- 2024/25: ▲0.130 million
Location
Notes
- Passenger statistics from the Office of Rail and Road

Broadbottom railway station serves the village of Broadbottom in Greater Manchester, England. It is on the Manchester-Glossop Line, 10 miles (16 km) east of Manchester Piccadilly. It was opened by the Sheffield, Ashton-Under-Lyne and Manchester Railway in 1842. It was renamed Mottram in 1845, but has since reverted to its original name.

East of the station is Broadbottom Viaduct which carries the line 120 feet (37 m) over the River Etherow. The official length of the viaduct is 422 feet 6 inches (128.78 m).

== History ==
The station is situated between mileposts 9 3/4 and 10 and has had various names over time. The Sheffield, Ashton-under-Lyne & Manchester Railway called it Broadbottom when it opened on 10 December 1842. In July 1845, the name became Mottram. The MS&L later decided on the best of both worlds when they renamed the station Mottram and Broadbottom on 1 May 1884. From 1 August 1897, the MS&LR became the Great Central Railway (GCR) and this was merged with other companies to form the London and North Eastern Railway (LNER) on 1 January 1923. Modern officials were not happy with such duplicity and the station reverted to its original title on 1 January 1954. Something of the former legend, though, was applied with the suffix for Mottram and Charlesworth remaining in use until comparatively recently.

Goods facilities here ceased on 15 July 1963, but the station remains open to passengers today. Never catering for more than local traffic, the station did have a moment of glory for a short period in the 1920s, when the LNER's morning restaurant car express from Manchester London Road to London Marylebone called here.

The wooden shelter was removed in March 2021.

== Facilities ==
The station has retained its ticket office, which is staffed six days per week (Mondays to Fridays 06:15 - 13:25, Saturdays 06:40 - 14:00, closed Sundays). Outside these times, tickets must be purchased prior to travel or on board the train. There is also a waiting room in the main building and a shelter on the Glossop-bound platform; the remaining buildings on the westbound side are now in private ownership. Train running details can be obtained via timetable posters, digital CIS displays and telephone. Level access is available only from the car park to platform 1, as both access routes to the opposite side require the use of steps.

== Services ==
There is a generally half-hourly daily service each way, with weekday peak extras, between Manchester Piccadilly, Glossop and Hadfield. Trains operate hourly in the evenings in each direction. Early morning, rush hour and late evening services start or terminate at Glossop.

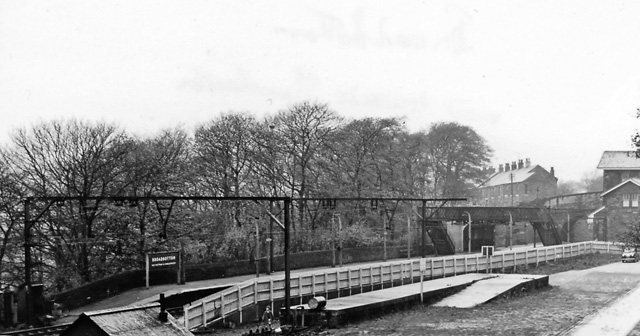
The platforms in 1965.

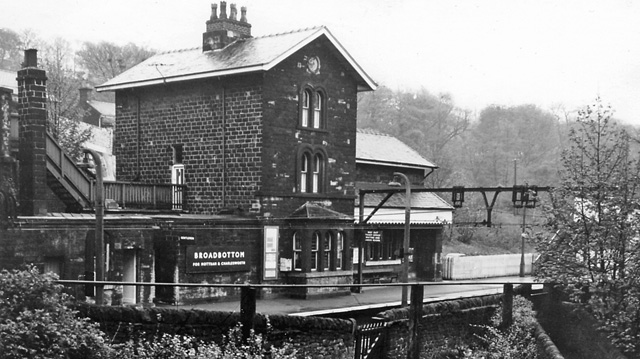
The station offices in the same year.

Preceding station	National Rail	Following station
Hattersley	Northern Trains Glossop Line	Dinting
Historical railways
Godley Junction Line open, station closed	Manchester, Sheffield and Lincolnshire Railway Woodhead Line	Dinting Line and station open
