= Godley, Greater Manchester =

Coordinates: 53.4536°N 2.0635°W

Godley
- Location within Greater Manchester
- Metropolitan borough: Tameside
- Metropolitan county: Greater Manchester
- Region: North West
- Country: England
- Sovereign state: United Kingdom
- Post town: HYDE
- Postcode district: SK14
- Dialling code: 0161
- Police: Greater Manchester
- Fire: Greater Manchester
- Ambulance: North West
- UK Parliament: Stalybridge and Hyde

Godley is a suburb of Hyde, in Greater Manchester, England, lying to the east of the town centre.

== History ==
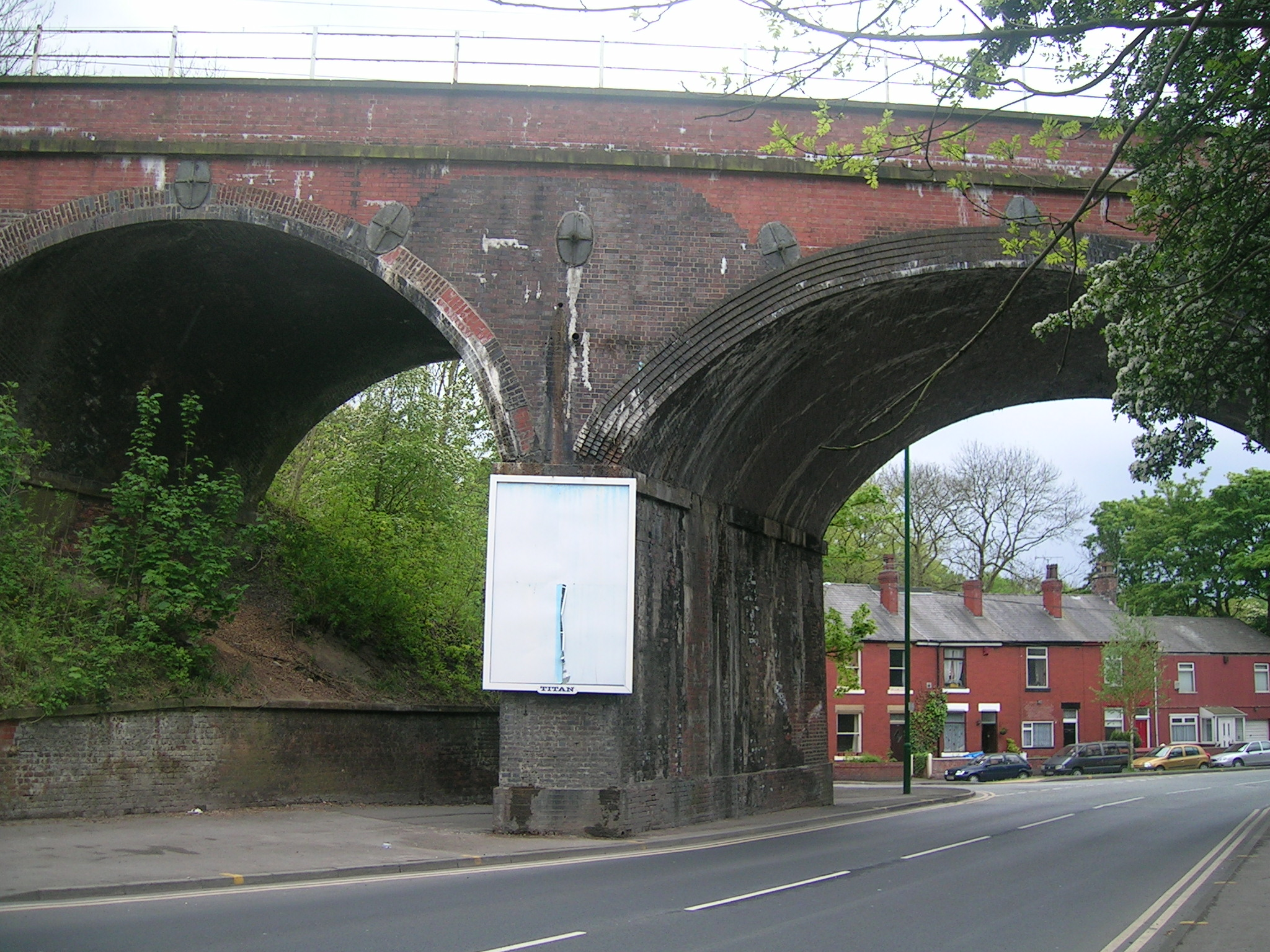
Mottram Road in Godley, with a viaduct of the Glossop Line

The earliest recorded agriculture in Tameside east of the River Tame was in Godley, from 1211–1249.

In 1851, Godley Reservoir was completed.

In 2023, Tameside Council granted planning permission for Godley Green Garden Village which includes 2,150 dwellings on land between the A560 road and the Manchester-Glossop railway line. This will be developed by MADE Partnership, a consortium of Barratt Redrow, Homes England and Lloyds Banking Group.

== Governance ==
There is one main tier of local government covering Godley, at metropolitan borough level: Tameside Metropolitan Borough Council. The council is a member of the Greater Manchester Combined Authority, which is led by the directly-elected Mayor of Greater Manchester. The Hyde Godley electoral ward is named after Godley. For national elections, the Hyde Godley ward is part of the Stalybridge and Hyde constituency.

=== Administrative history ===
Godley was historically a township in the ancient parish of Mottram-in-Longdendale, which formed part of the Macclesfield Hundred of Cheshire. From the 17th century onwards, parishes were gradually given various civil functions under the poor laws, in addition to their original ecclesiastical functions. In some cases, including Mottram-in-Longdendale, the civil functions were exercised by each township separately rather than the parish as a whole. In 1866, the legal definition of 'parish' was changed to be the areas used for administering the poor laws, and so Godley became a civil parish.

In terms of ecclesiastical parishes, Godley was separated from Mottram-in-Longdendale in 1847, and a church dedicated to St John the Baptist was completed in 1850.

In 1877, the township or civil parish of Godley was absorbed into the Hyde local government district. The Hyde local government district was raised to the status of a municipal borough in 1881. Godley continued to exist as an urban parish within the borough of Hyde until 1923, when all the parishes within the borough were merged into a single civil parish called Hyde.

The borough of Hyde was abolished in 1974 under the Local Government Act 1972. The area became part of the Metropolitan Borough of Tameside in Greater Manchester.

== Industry ==
In the early 1880s, John Broomer developed an early form of margarine called Butterine. He established a factory in the Olive Tree works, a former hat factory on Mottram Road previously occupied by Henry Taylor Wrigley. In 1888, the Danish margarine manufacturer Otto Monsted acquired the Olive Tree works. The factory was sold to Maypole Dairies in 1902 and later used by Walls to manufacture ice cream and meat products.

== Transport ==
Godley is served by Godley railway station, which replaced the nearby Godley East railway station.
