= Godley railway station =

Railway station in Greater Manchester, England

Godley
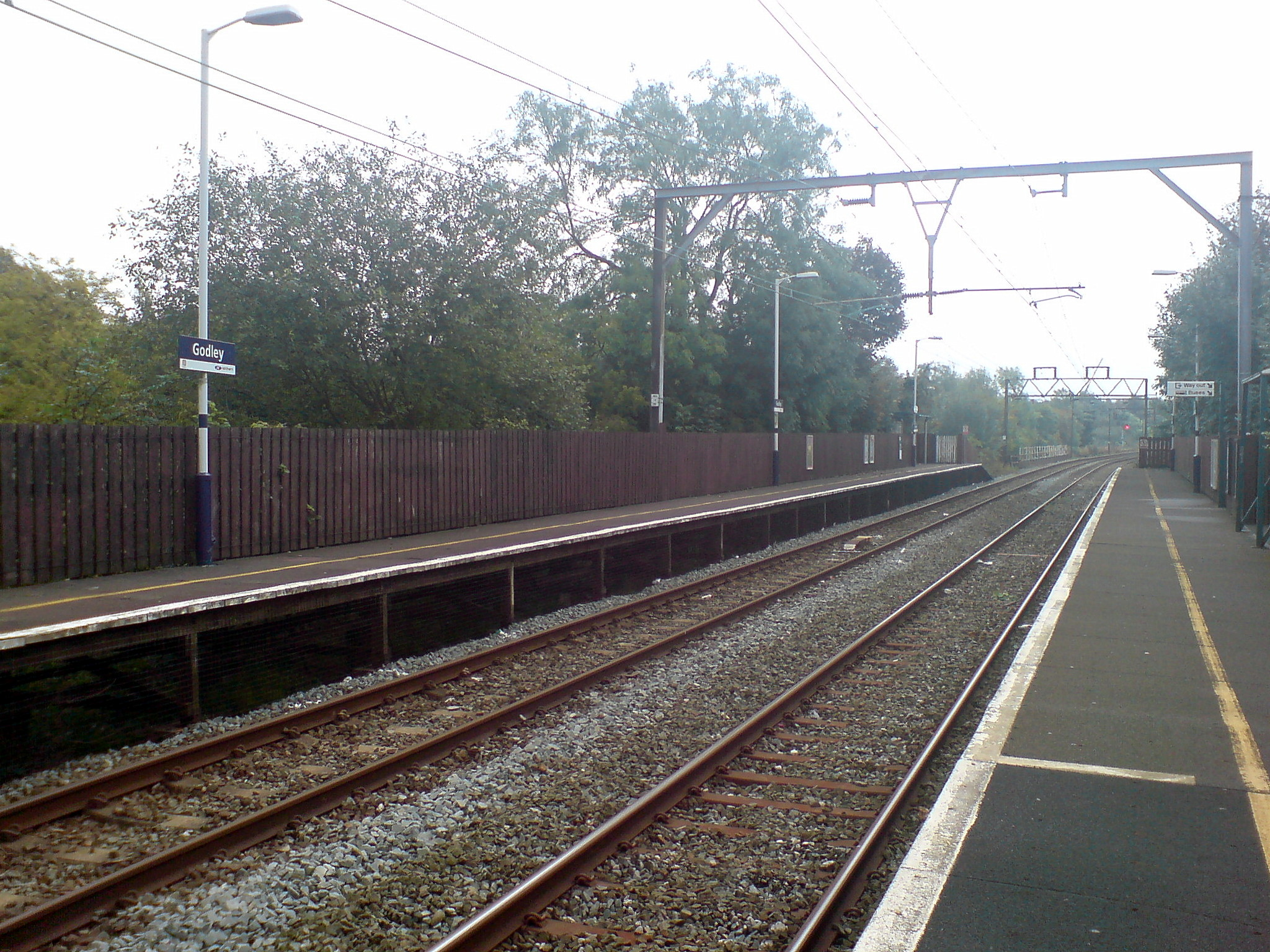

General information
- Location: Godley, Tameside; England
- Coordinates: 53.452°N 2.055°W
- Grid reference: SJ963950
- Managed by: Northern Trains
- Transit authority: Transport for Greater Manchester
- Platforms: 2

Other information
- Station code: GDL
- Classification: DfT category F2

History
- Original company: British Railways Board

Key dates
- 7 July 1986: Station opened

Passengers
- 2020/21: ▼23,142
- 2021/22: ▲63,618
- 2022/23: ▼59,912
- 2023/24: ▲71,324
- 2024/25: ▲74,244
Location
Notes
- Passenger statistics from the Office of Rail and Road

Godley railway station serves the Godley area of Hyde, Tameside, Greater Manchester, England. It is 8 1/2 miles (13.7 km) east of Manchester Piccadilly on the Manchester-Glossop Line.

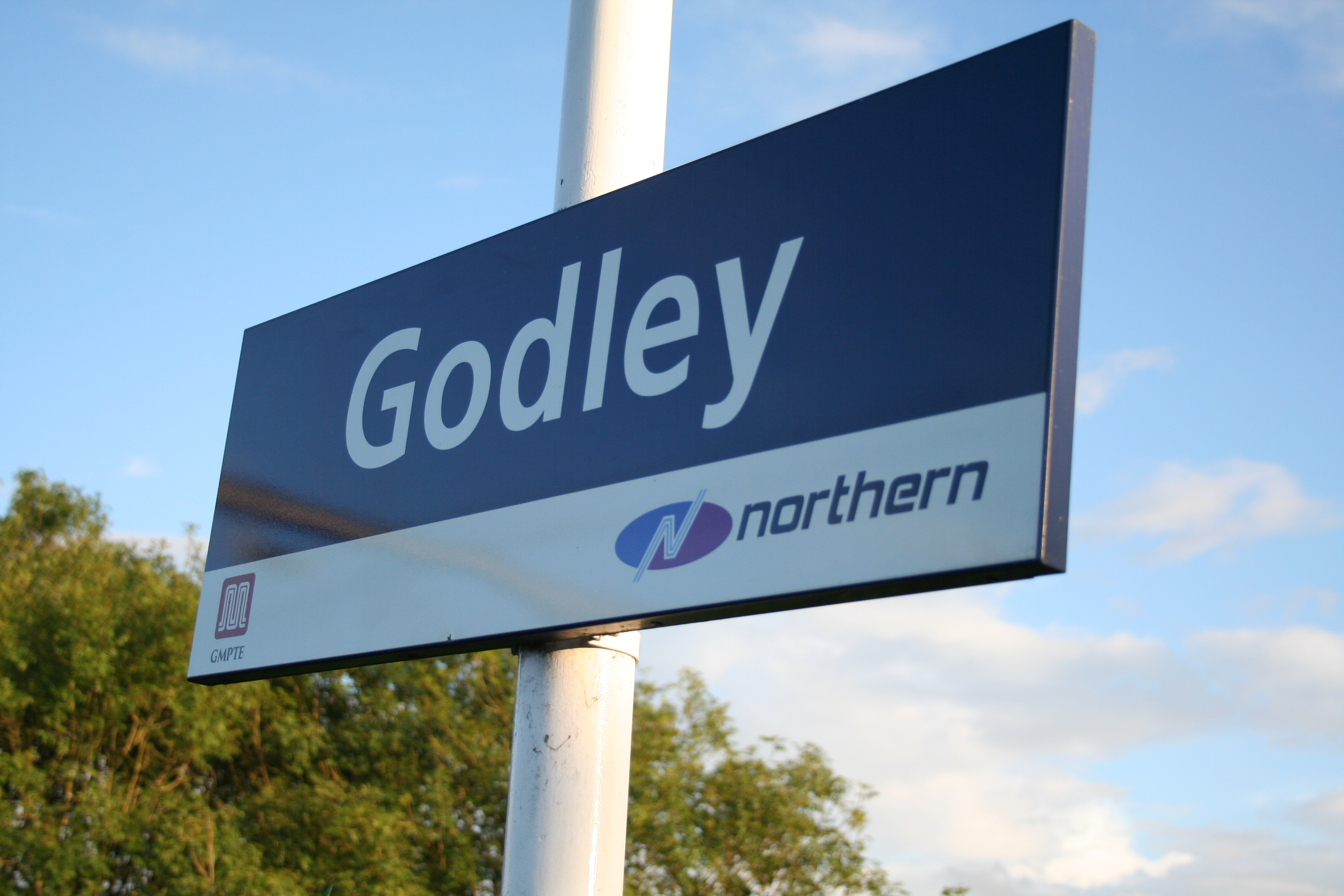
Sign at Godley

It was built to replace the original Godley Junction station. It is placed above a bridge, hence the narrow platforms. Unlike most stations built on the line (with the exception of Flowery Field), it is built on wooden stilts, unlike the stone platforms built for the Woodhead Line.

== Services ==
There is a half-hourly daily service (including Sundays) to Manchester Piccadilly and Hadfield, with an hourly service in the evenings and extra trains during the weekday business peaks.

Additionally the 17:26 service from Hadfield to Piccadilly is the only service not to call at Godley, which only calls at Dinting, Broadbottom, Hattersley, Newton for Hyde, Flowery Field, Guide Bridge, Ashburys and Piccadilly.

== Facilities ==
The station is unstaffed, has one ticket machine at the bottom of the stairs by the entrance to the station and does not have customer help points. Waiting shelters are located on each side, with train running information provided by timetable posters and by LED screens with automated announcements. No step-free access is available to the platforms.

Preceding station	National Rail	Following station
Newton for Hyde	Northern Trains Manchester-Glossop Line	Hattersley
