= Hattersley (surname) =

Hattersley is an English surname, originally given to people from Hattersley, Greater Manchester. Notable people with the surname include:

- Camilla Hattersley (born 1995), British swimmer
- Giles Hattersley (born 1979), British journalist
- Martin Hattersley (1932–2020), British-born Canadian lawyer and politician
- Roy Hattersley (1932–2026), British politician and author
