= Tameside =

Borough in Greater Manchester, England

Metropolitan Borough of Tameside
- Metropolitan borough
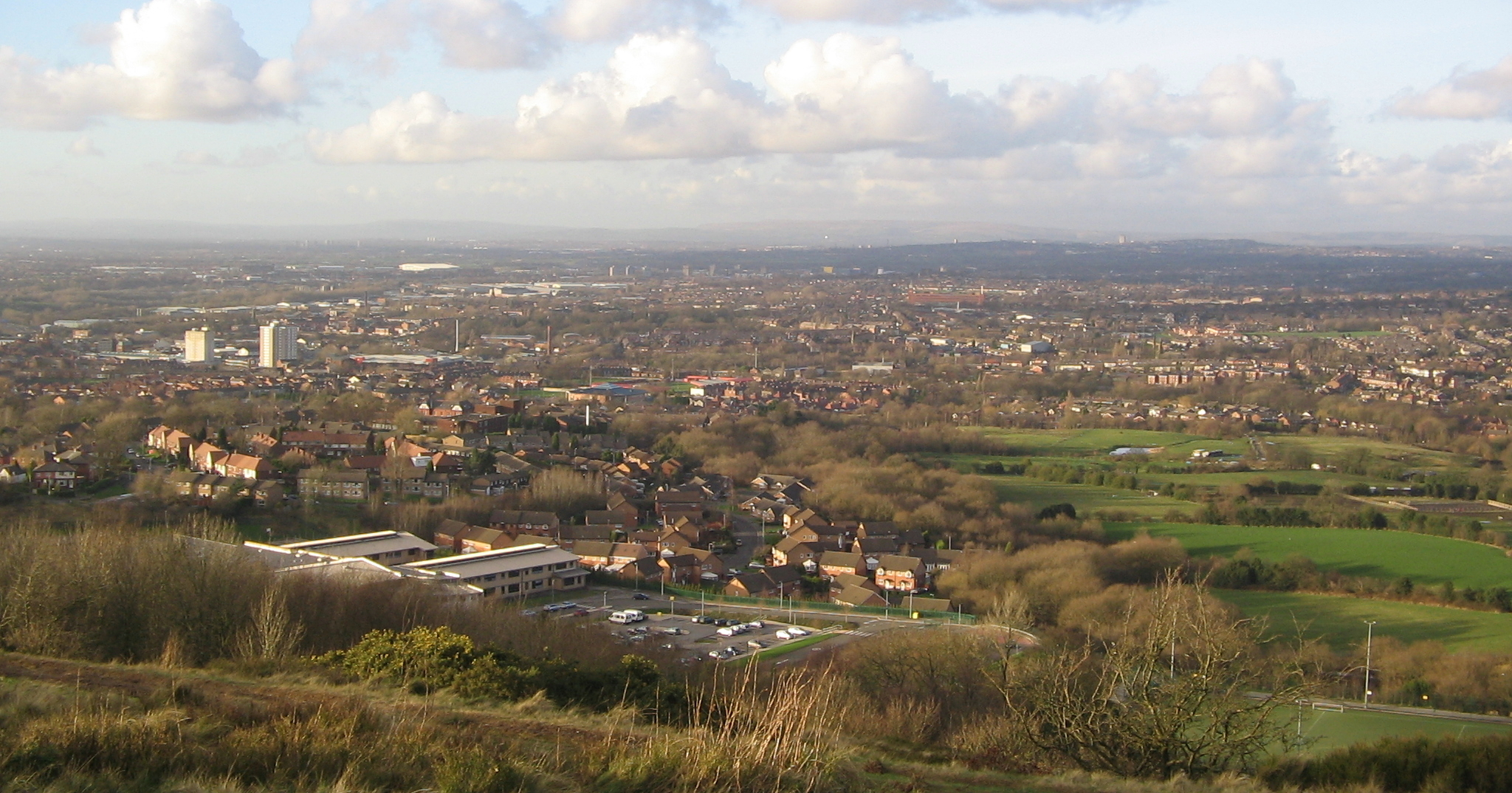
- Tameside from Werneth Low

- Coat of arms
- Motto: Industry and integrity
- Tameside shown within Greater Manchester
- Coordinates: 53°29′24″N 2°5′39″W
- Sovereign state: United Kingdom
- Country: England
- Region: North West
- Ceremonial county and city region: Greater Manchester
- Incorporated: 1 April 1974
- Named for: River Tame
- Administrative HQ: Ashton-under-Lyne

Government
  - Type: Metropolitan borough
  - Body: Tameside Metropolitan Borough Council
  - Executive: Leader and cabinet
  - Control: No overall control
  - Leader: Eleanor Wills (L)
  - Mayor: Betty Affleck
  - MPs: 3 MPs: Hannah Spencer (G); Angela Rayner (L); Jonathan Reynolds (L)

Area
  - Total: 103 km^{2} (40 sq mi)
  - Rank: 195th

Population (2025)
  - Total: 240,822
  - Rank: 80th
  - Density: 2,335/km^{2} (6,050/sq mi)

Ethnicity (2021)
  - Ethnic groups: List: 85.5% White; 9.2% Asian; 2.3% Black; 2.1% Mixed; 0.8% other

Religion (2021)
  - Religion: List: 47.8% Christianity; 38.0% no religion; 7.3% Islam; 1.3% Hinduism; 0.3% Buddhism; 0.1% Sikhism; 0.0% Judaism; 0.4% other; 4.7% not stated
- Time zone: UTC+0 (GMT)
  - Summer (DST): UTC+1 (BST)
- Postcode area: M; OL; SK
- Dialling code: 01457; 0161
- ISO 3166 code: GB-TAM
- GSS code: E08000008
- Website: tameside.gov.uk

Tameside is a metropolitan borough of Greater Manchester, England, named after the River Tame, which flows through it. It includes the towns of Ashton-under-Lyne, Audenshaw, Denton, Droylsden, Dukinfield, Hyde, Mossley and Stalybridge. Tameside is bordered by the metropolitan boroughs of Stockport to the south, Oldham to the north and northeast, Manchester to the west, and to the east by the Borough of High Peak in Derbyshire. As of 2025, the population of Tameside was 240,822, making it the 8th-most populous borough of Greater Manchester.

There are over 300 listed buildings in Tameside and three Scheduled Ancient Monuments, including Buckton Castle. Its townships were agricultural until the Industrial Revolution when they grew with the cotton industry. The borough was created in 1974 under the Local Government Act 1972.

== History ==
The history of the area stretches back up to 10,000 years; there are 22 Mesolithic sites in Tameside, the oldest dating to around 8000 BC; 21 of the 22 sites are in the hilly uplands in the north east of the borough. Evidence of Neolithic and Bronze Age activity is more limited in the borough, although the Bronze Age Stalybridge Cairn is the most complete prehistoric funerary monument in the borough. The people in the area changed from hunter-gatherers to farmers around 2500 BC–1500 BC due to climate change. Werneth Low is the most likely Iron Age farmstead site in the borough, probably dating to the late 1st millennium BC. Before the Roman conquest of Britain in the 1st century AD, the area was probably part of the territory of the Brigantes, the Celtic tribe controlling most of what is now north west England.

The area came under control of the Roman Empire in the second half of the 1st century. Roads through the area were established from Ardotalia fort in Derbyshire to Mamucium (Manchester) west of Tameside and Castleshaw Roman fort in the north. Romano-British finds in the borough include a bog body in Ashton Moss, occupation sites at Werneth Low, Harridge Pike, Roe Cross, and Mottram. A 4th-century coin hoard was found in Denton and is one of only four hoards from the 4th century in the Mersey basin. A Byzantine coin from the 6th or 7th centuries, also found in Denton, indicates continued or renewed occupation once the Romans left Britain in the early 5th century.

Nico Ditch, an earthwork stretching from Stretford to Ashton-under-Lyne, is evidence of Anglo-Saxon activity in Tameside. It was probably dug between the 7th and 9th centuries and may have been used as a boundary between the kingdoms of Mercia and Northumbria. Further evidence of Anglo-Saxon era activity in Tameside comes from the derivation of settlement names from Old English such as -tun, meaning farmstead, and leah meaning clearing.

According to the Domesday Survey of 1086, Tameside was divided into four manors, those of Tintwistle, Hollingworth, Werneth, and Mottram. The land east of the River Tame was in the Hundred of Hamestan in Cheshire and held by the Earl of Chester while to the west of the river was in the Hundred of Salford under Roger de Poitevin. These manors were divided to create further manors, so that by the 13th century most of them were owned by local families and remained in the hands of the same families until the 16th century. Manorialism continued as the main form of administration and governance until the mid-19th century.

The Industrial Revolution had a significant impact on Tameside; the area, whose main towns had previously been Ashton-under-Lyne and Mottram-in-Longdendale, was transformed from a collection of the rural, farming communities into mill towns. The towns of Ashton-under-Lyne, Dukinfield, Hyde, Mossley and Stalybridge have been described as "amongst the most famous mills towns in the North West". With only a brief interruption for the Lancashire Cotton Famine of 1861 to 1865, factories producing and processing textiles were the main industry in Tameside from the late-18th century until the mid-20th century.

In 1964, Dukinfield Borough Council convened a meeting of neighbouring local authorities with the aim of formulating a policy of cross-authority social improvement for the districts in the Tame Valley. Following deindustrialisation, the area had suffered "gross-neglect" and had large areas of housing unsuitable for human habitation. This joint enterprise comprised the nine districts that would become Tameside ten years later, plus the County Borough of Stockport. This collective agreed on creating "a linear park in the valley [of the River Tame] for the use of the townspeople and as a major recreational resource within the Manchester metropolis".

Tameside was created on 1 April 1974, by the Local Government Act 1972 as one of the ten metropolitan districts of Greater Manchester. The new district covered the territory of nine former districts which were abolished at the same time:

- Ashton-under-Lyne Municipal Borough
- Audenshaw Urban District
- Denton Urban District
- Droylsden Urban District
- Dukinfield Municipal Borough
- Hyde Municipal Borough
- Longdendale Urban District
- Mossley Municipal Borough
- Stalybridge Municipal Borough

Dukinfield, Hyde, Longdendale and Stalybridge had been in the administrative county of Cheshire prior to the 1974 reforms, whilst the other five districts had been in the administrative county of Lancashire.

A name for the metropolitan borough proved problematic. The Redcliffe-Maud Report had used the name Ashton-Hyde, but double-barrelled names were prohibited for the new districts. Had Ashton-under-Lyne been a county borough, or had had a less common name, "it might have been chosen as the new name" for the new district. The eight other towns objected, adamant that "a new name should be found". Thirty suggestions were put forward, including Brigantia, Clarendon, Hartshead, Kayborough, Tame, Ninetowns, and West Pennine, with Hartshead (with reference to Hartshead Pike) being the most popular throughout most of the consultation period. However, the name Tameside (with reference to the River Tame, but a concocted name with no historical basis) won 15 votes to Hartshead's 10 in a final stage of voting. The new district was awarded borough status from its creation, allowing the chairman of the council to take the title of mayor. In 1986 Tameside effectively became a unitary authority with the abolition of the Greater Manchester County Council.

== Geography ==
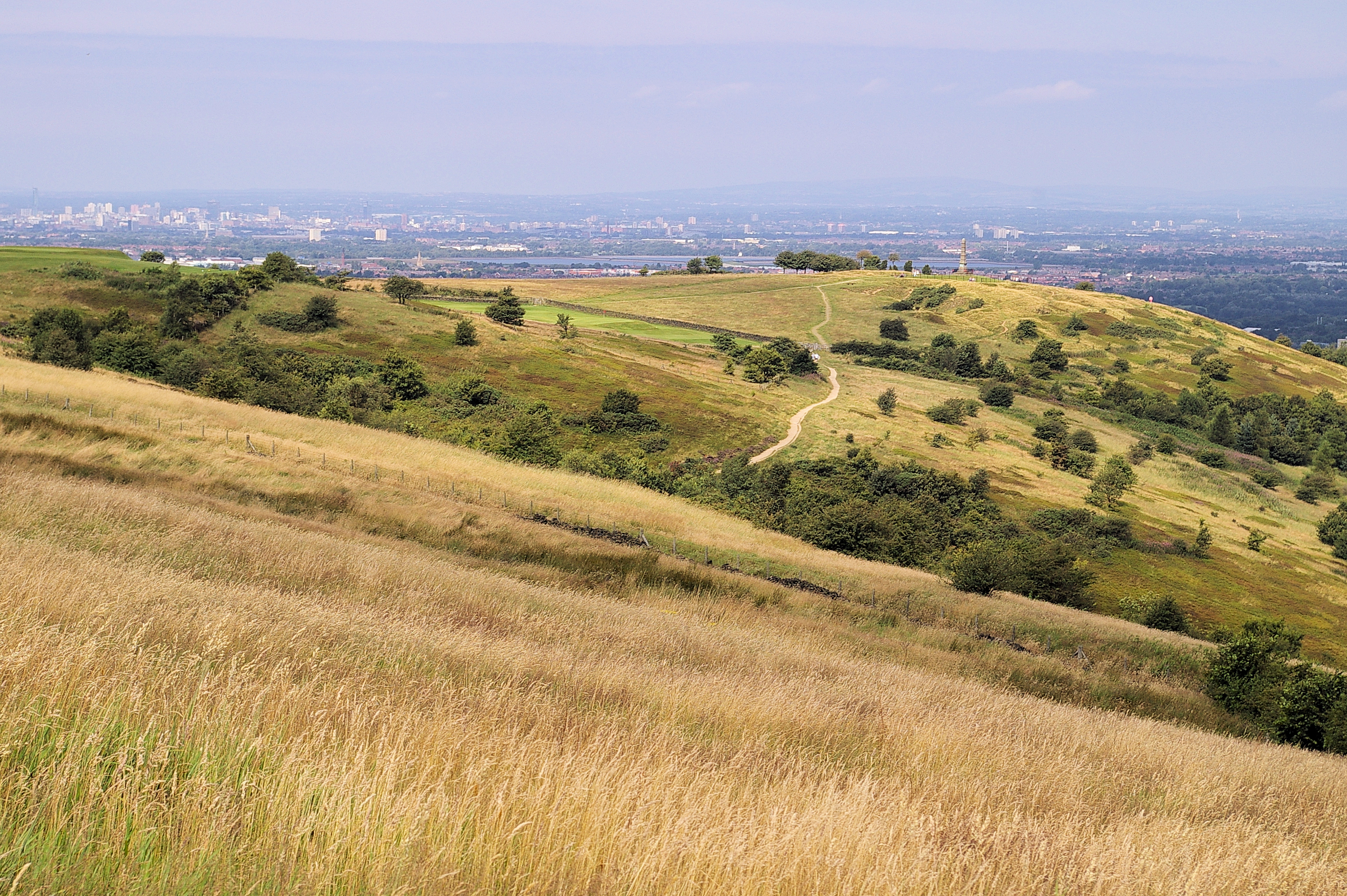
Werneth Low with the Greater Manchester Urban Area in the background.

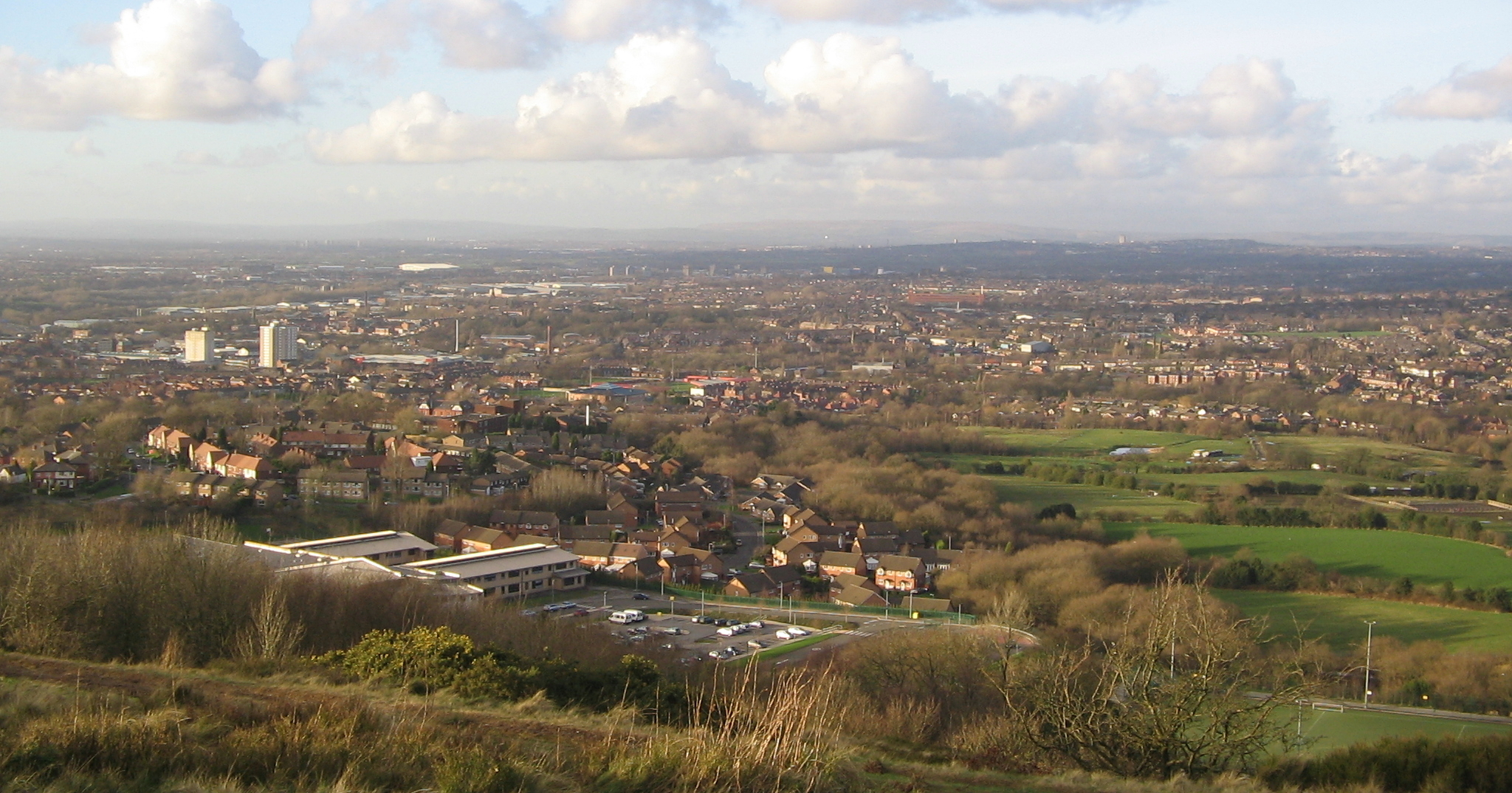
View from Werneth Low over Hyde (left, foreground), towards Ashton-under-Lyne (centre) in the background.

Tameside borders High Peak in Derbyshire to the east, the Metropolitan Borough of Oldham to the north, the Metropolitan Borough of Stockport to the south, and the City of Manchester to the west. Tameside features flat lowlands in the west and highlands in the east where the western edge of the Pennines encroaches on the borough. The hills in the east include Hartshead Pike and Werneth Low which is also a country park. As well as coal measures running north–south through the centre of the borough, there are areas of peat in the north east and there are large areas of boulder clay all over Tameside. Ashton Moss is a peat bog covering about 107 hectares (260 acres) and Denton Moor is an area of about 81 hectares (200 acres) of peat.

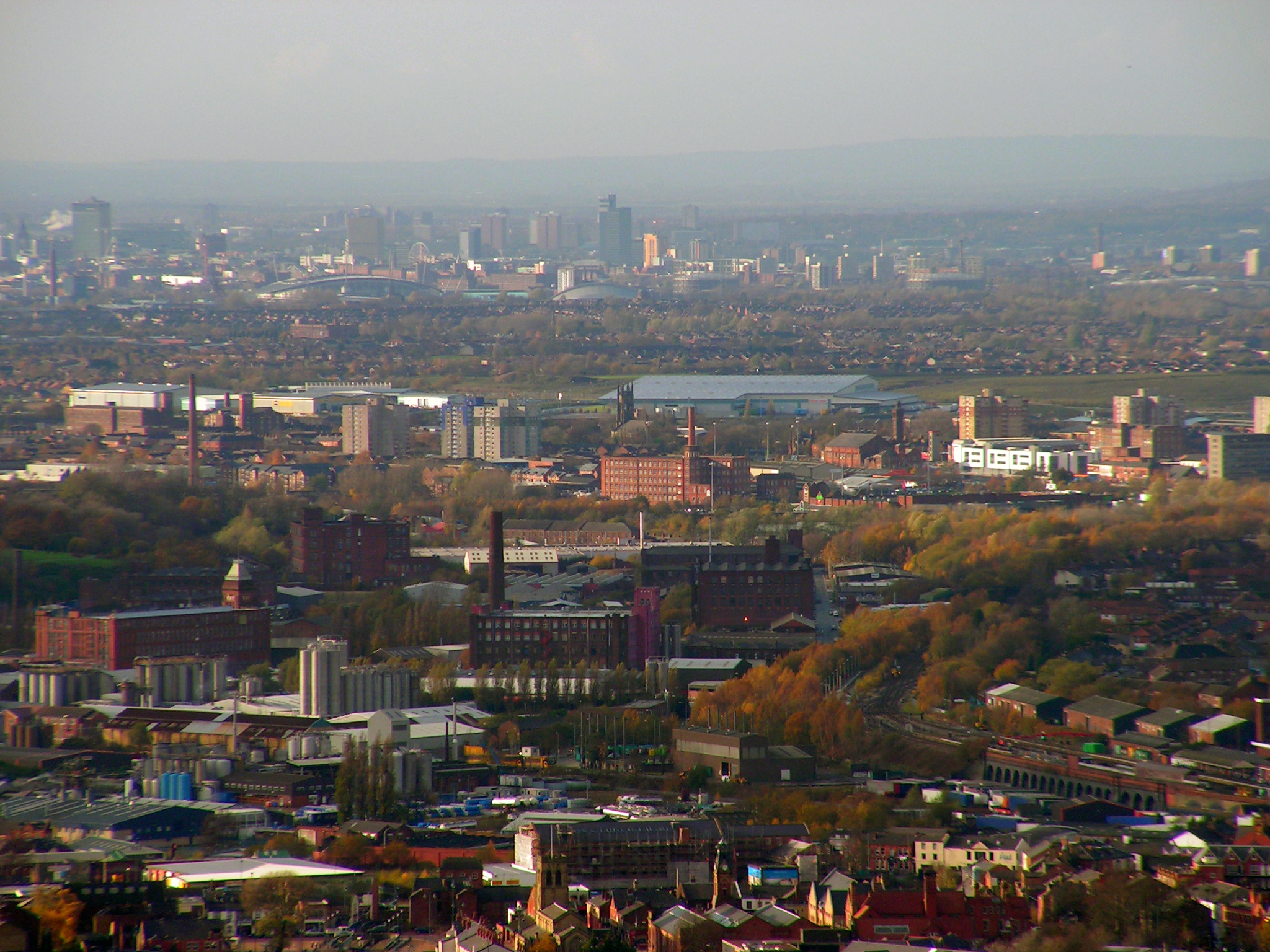
A view over Tameside, towards Manchester city centre.

Waterways in Tameside include the rivers Medlock and Etherow, which form parts of Tameside's western and eastern boundaries respectively, and the River Tame crosses the borough north to south, giving Tameside its name. The Ashton Canal, the Hollinwood Branch Canal, the Huddersfield Narrow Canal, and the Peak Forest Canal all run through the borough. There are also several reservoirs, including the Audenshaw Reservoirs. Greenspace accounts for 63.5% of the Tameside's total area, domestic buildings and gardens comprise 17.4%, and the rest is made up of roads and non-domestic buildings.

Localities within the boundaries of Tameside include: Ashton-under-Lyne, Audenshaw, Broadbottom, Carrbrook, Copley, Denton, Droylsden, Dukinfield, Flowery Field, Gee Cross, Godley, Godley Green, Guide Bridge, Hartshead Green, Hattersley, Haughton Green, Hazelhurst, Heyrod, Hollingworth, Hyde, Landslow Green, Luzley, Millbrook, Micklehurst, Mossley, Mottram in Longdendale, Newton, Park Bridge, Roe Cross, Stalybridge, Warhill, and Woolley Bridge.

== Governance ==
=== Parliamentary constituencies ===
The residents of the Tameside are represented in the United Kingdom Parliament by Members of Parliament (MPs) for three constituencies. Ashton-under-Lyne, which also includes parts of the Metropolitan Borough of Oldham, is represented by Angela Rayner (Labour). Gorton and Denton, which also covers parts of Manchester, is represented by Hannah Spencer (Green). Stalybridge and Hyde, which is entirely within Tameside, is represented by Jonathan Reynolds (Labour).

=== Council ===
In 2007, Tameside Metropolitan Borough Council was assessed by the Audit Commission and judged to be "improving strongly" in providing services for local people. Overall the council was awarded "four star" status meaning it was "performing strongly" and "well above minimum requirements", putting it in the top 38% of all local authorities.

Civil parishes form the bottom tier of local government; the parish councils are involved in planning, management of town and parish centres, and promoting tourism. Mossley is the only civil parish in Tameside. In 2001 9,856 people lived there, 4.6% of the borough's population.

Before becoming a civil parish, Mossley was a municipal borough. The unparished areas are: Ashton-under-Lyne (municipal borough), Audenshaw (urban district), Denton (urban district), Droylsden (urban district), Dukinfield (municipal borough), Hyde (municipal borough), Longdendale (urban district), and Stalybridge (municipal borough). The status of each area before 1974 is shown in brackets. An urban district was a type of local government district which covered an urbanised area. Ashton-under-Lyne, Audenshaw, Denton, Droylsden, and Mossley were previously in Lancashire. Dukinfield, Hyde, Longdendale, and Stalybridge were in Cheshire.

== Demography ==
=== Ethnicity ===
Ethnic Group	Year			
Ethnic Group	2001 census		2021 census	
Ethnic Group	Number	%	Number	%
White: Total	201,468	94.6%	197,676	85.6%
White: British	197,487	92.7%	190,305	82.4%
White: Irish	1,943		1,536	0.7
White: Roma			100	<0.05
White: Gypsy or Irish Traveller			112	<0.1
White: Other	2,038		5,623	2.4
Asian or Asian British: Total	9,097	4.3%	21,198	9.1%
Asian or Asian British: Indian	3,087		3,737	1.6
Asian or Asian British: Pakistani	2,596		8,966	3.9
Asian or Asian British: Bangladeshi	2,493		5,842	2.5
Asian or Asian British: Chinese	630		1,402	0.6
Asian or Asian British: Other Asian	291		1,251	0.5
Black or Black British: Total	572		5,275	2.3%
Black or Black British: African	160		4,115	1.8
Black or Black British: Caribbean	348		612	0.3
Other Black	64		548	0.2
Mixed or British Mixed: Total	1,681	0.8%	4,963	2.2%
Mixed: White and Black Caribbean	670		1,854	0.8
Mixed: White and Black African	238		859	0.4
Mixed: White and Asian	506		1,344	0.6
Mixed: Other Mixed	267		906	0.4
Other: Total	225		1,958	0.8%
Other: Arab			540	0.2
Other: Any other ethnic group			1,418	0.6
Non-White: Total				14.4%
Total	213,043	100%	231,071	100%

At the 2011 UK census, the Metropolitan Borough of Tameside had a total population of 219,324. Of the 94,953 households in Tameside, 30.8% were married couples living together, 32.7% were one-person households, 11.5% were co-habiting couples and 12.8% were lone parents.

The population density was 2,126/km^{2} (5,510/sq mi) and for every 100 females, there were 96.4 males. Of those aged 16 and over in Tameside, 28.1% had no academic qualifications, significantly higher than 22.5% in all of England. 7% of Tameside's residents were born outside the United Kingdom, significantly lower than the national average of 13.8%. The largest minority group was Asian, at 6.6% of the population.

In 1841, 8.5% of Tameside's population was middle class compared to 14% in England and Wales; this increased to 13.1% in 1931 (15% nationally) and 37.0% in 2001 (48% nationally). From 1841 to 1991, the working class population of Tameside and across the country was in decline, falling steadily from 58.0% (36% nationally) to 22.8% in 1991 (21% nationally). It has since increased slightly, up to 32.9% (26% nationwide). The rest of the population was made up of clerical workers and skilled manual workers.

=== Population change ===
Although Tameside has only existed as a Metropolitan Borough since 1974, the table below details the population change – including the percentage change since the last census 10 years earlier – in the area since 1801 using figures from the towns, villages, and civil parishes that would later become constituent parts of Tameside.

Population growth in Tameside since 1801
Year	1801	1811	1821	1831	1841	1851	1861	1871	1881	1891		
Population	20,716	27,219	45,440	64,044	103,928	120,183	129,346	138,509	147,672	158,343		
% change	–	+31.4	+66.8	+40.9	+62.3	+15.6	+7.6	+7.1	+6.6	+7.2		
Year	1901	1911	1921	1931	1941	1951	1961	1971	1981	1991	2001	2011
Population	175,877	195,353	192,764	190,210	198,492	207,137	213,973	221,067	217,050	219,769	213,043	219,324
% change	+11.1	+11.1	-1.3	-1.3	+4.4	+4.4	+3.3	+3.3	-1.8	+1.3	-3.1	+1.0
Source: A Vision of Britain through Time; accessed 9 January 2016.

=== Religion ===
The following table shows the religious identity of residents residing in Tameside according to the 2011 and the 2021 census results.

Religion	2011		2021	
Religion	Number	%	Number	%
Christian	140,322	64.0	110,539	47.8
Muslim	9,705	4.4	16,945	7.3
Jewish	89	<0.1	87	<0.1
Hindu	3,223	1.5	3,096	1.3
Sikh	102	<0.1	181	0.1
Buddhism	511	0.2	588	0.3
Other religion	651	0.3	879	0.4
No religion	51,674	23.6	87,910	38.0
Religion not stated	13,047	5.9	10,846	4.7
Total	219,324	100.00%	231,071	100.00%

Tameside is covered by the Roman Catholic dioceses of Shrewsbury and Salford, and the Church of England dioceses of Manchester and Chester.

There are two Grade I listed churches in Tameside, St Anne's Church, in Haughton, was built in 1881 in the Gothic Revival style by J Medland Taylor. St Michael and All Angels' Church in Ashton-under-Lyne is a 15th-century parish church which was virtually rebuilt in the 19th century. A church on the site dates back to at least 1262. St Lawrence's Church, in Denton, is a Grade II* listed building and a timber-framed church. It was remodelled by J Medland Taylor in 1872.

== Economy ==
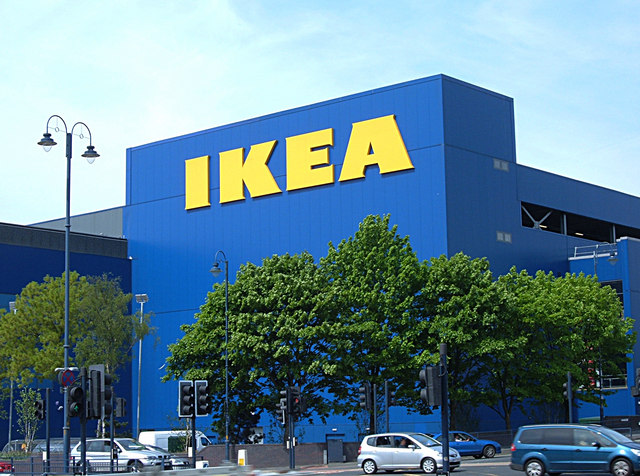
IKEA's store in Ashton-under-Lyne, which opened in 2006, was their first in a town centre.

Tameside is currently undergoing redevelopment through the Vision Tameside project which should be completed by 2018.

Vision Tameside – a partnership between Tameside council and Tameside College – is a redevelopment strategy.

Three "advanced learning centres" are being built in central Ashton town and at the college's Beaufort Road home.

Phase one comprises two sites. The new Clarendon Sixth Form College, which began taking students in the autumn of 2015, was officially opened by Coronation Street actress Brooke Vincent on 9 March 2016. The college theatre was named in Brooke's honour.

An "advanced technologies centre" is being built on Stamford Street, Ashton. When it opens in 2017 it will provide a learning facility to support the growth of advanced engineering and technology in Tameside.

Phase two of VisionTameside will create an advanced skills centre for Tameside College alongside a new joint service centre for Tameside Council and partners. The skills centre will provide facilities for students studying a wide range of vocational subjects including hair and beauty, hospitality and catering, bakery and confectionery, travel and tourism and business skills.

Ashton's Victorian town hall and the old water board offices, which are both listed buildings, are being retained. Work should be completed in early 2018.

Phase three will ensure the Beaufort Road campus offers learners modern, inspirational learning spaces. Alongside the new advanced technologies centre, they will have access to facilities for engineering, construction and the built environment, motor-vehicle, sport and public services and health and social care provision

Provision for students with severe learning difficulties and/or disabilities will continue to be based at the Beaufort Road where a new sports academy was opened in February, 2015, by former Manchester United and England footballer Paul Scholes.

In addition, Ashton's old public baths, which lay derelict for many years, has been reborn as a "high-tech business incubator" with help from the European Regional Development Fund and the Heritage Lottery Fund.

Work at the mid-Victorian building, which closed as a swimming baths in 1975, has involved cleaning, repairs and the replacement of external stonework. The new office space is housed inside a free-standing timber-clad pod within the former main pool.

At the same time, Ashton's market has been refurbished with the installation of kiosks alongside traditional stalls.

The Ashton Arcades shopping centre opened in 1995. The centre covers 13,000 square metres (140,000 sq ft) on two floors with over 40 shops. In 2006, after failing twice to gain permission to develop a site in the neighbouring borough of Stockport, IKEA announced plans to build its first town centre-store in Ashton-under-Lyne. The store is expected to create 500 new jobs as well as attract other businesses to the area. The store opened on 19 October 2006 and covers 27,500 square metres (296,000 sq ft) At the time of its creation, the store was the tallest in Britain.

Tameside Compared
2011 UK Census	Tameside	Greater Manchester	England
Population of working age	161,459	940,438	38,881,374
Full-time employment	40.6%	31.6%	38.6%
Part-time employment	13.2%	19.6%	13.7%
Self employed	7.4%	4.1%	9.8%
Unemployed	5.0%	3.8%	4.4%
Retired	14.7%	14.6%	13.7%

Life science industries have been identified as growth industries in Greater Manchester and are concentrated in Oldham and Tameside.

Average house prices in Tameside are the 5th lowest of the ten boroughs in Greater Manchester and are prices just 60% of the average price for the England.

At the 2011 UK census, Tameside had 161,459 residents aged 16 to 74. 4.3% of these people were students, 4.0% looking after home or family, 6.2% long-term sick or disabled and 2.2% economically inactive for other reasons.

In 2011, of 101,892 residents of Tameside in employment, the industry of employment was 17.7% retail and wholesale, 13.2% manufacturing, 12.4% health and social work, 8.5% construction, 8.3% education, 5.8% public administration and defence, 5.3% transport, 5.0% professional, scientific and technical, 4.8% administrative, 4.5% hotels and restaurants, 4.1% financial, 2.4% information and communication, 1.7% real estate, 1.6% energy and water supply, and 4.5% others.

== Landmarks ==
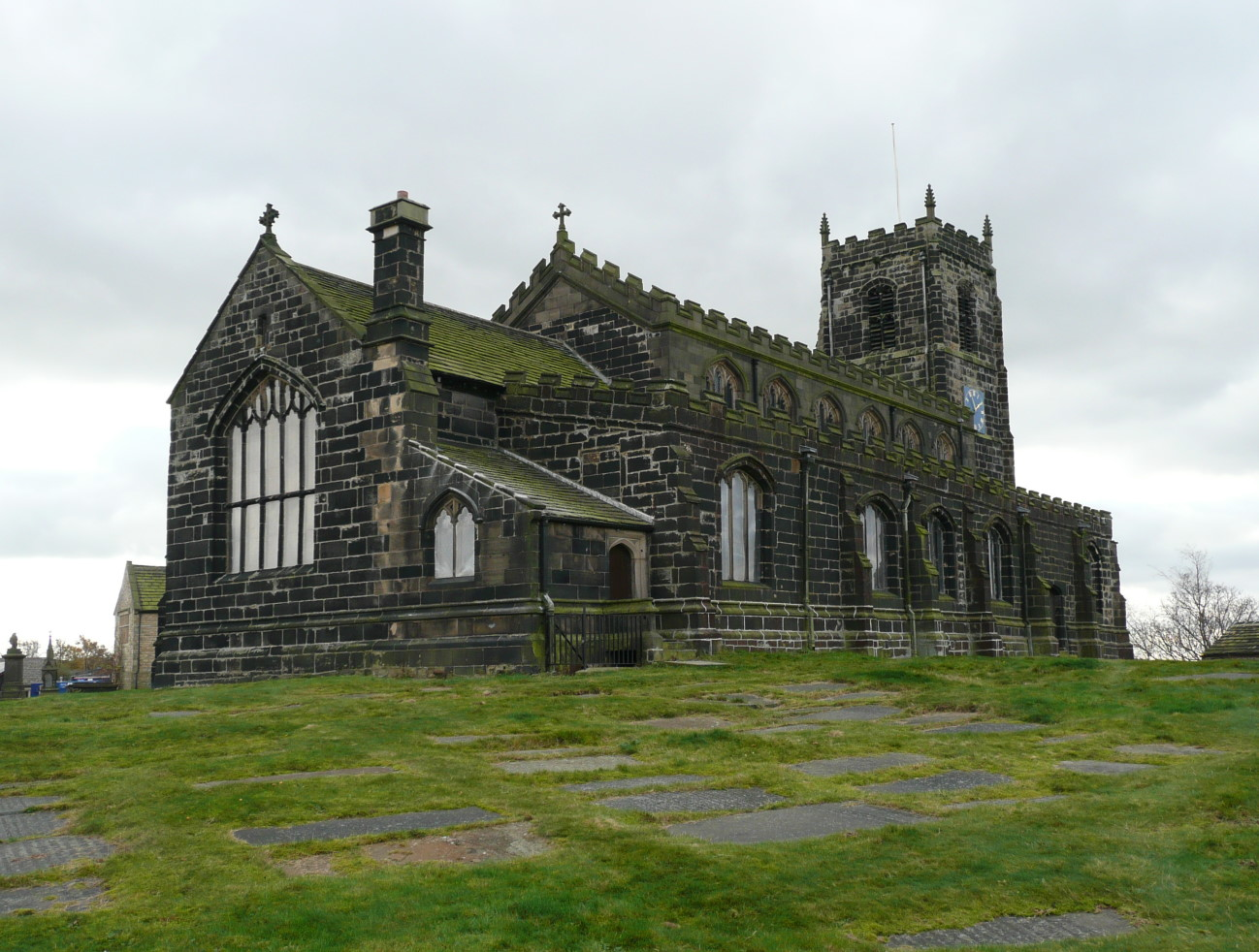
The Church of St Michael and All Angels, Mottram in Longdendale, is one of Tameside's Grade II* listed buildings.

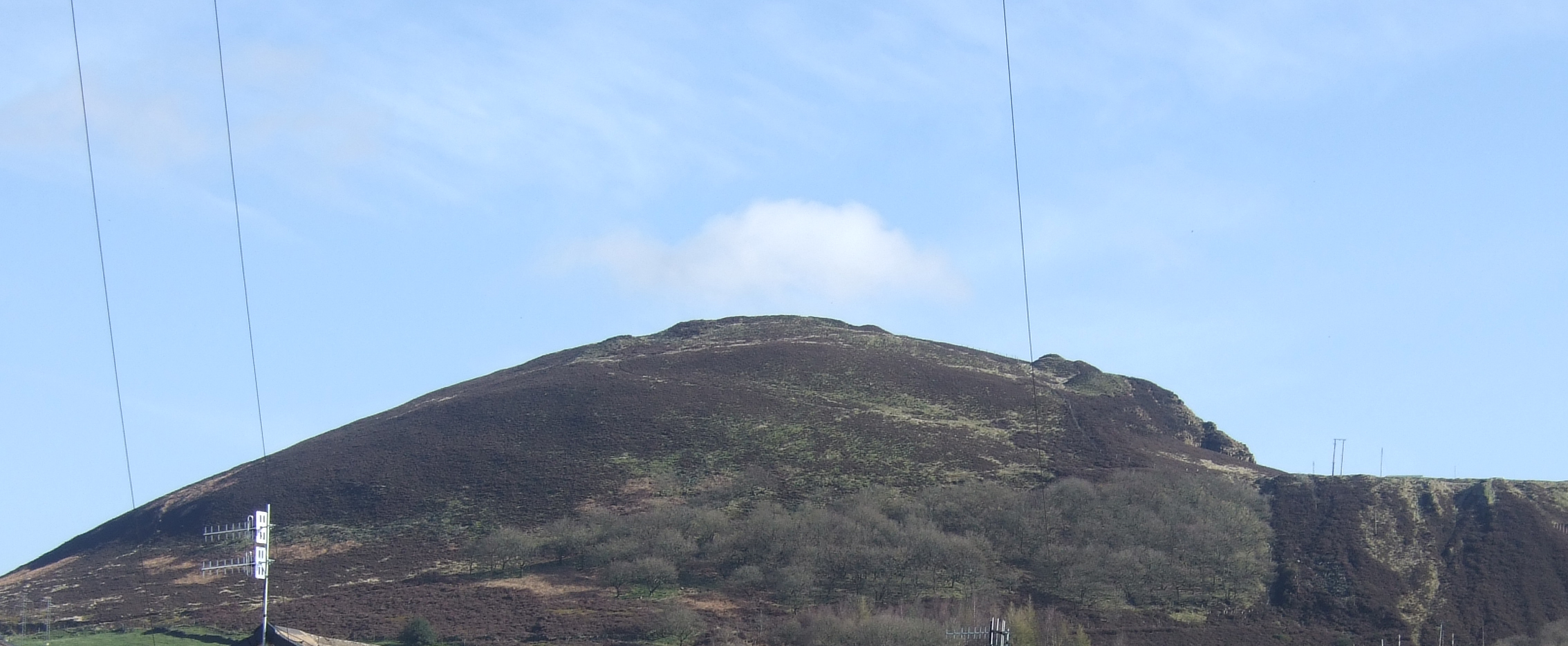
View of Buckton Castle from below

In February 2001, Tameside had one Grade I listed buildings, 19 Grade II*, and 289 Grade II. The number of Grade I listed buildings in Tameside has increased to two, these are St Anne's Church in Haughton; St Michael and All Angels' Church in Ashton-under-Lyne. (Fairbottom Farm Barn, a 17th-century farm building, is listed on the council's website as grade I but is listed by English Heritage as grade II.) In Tameside are three of Greater Manchester's Sites of Special Scientific Interest, Boar Flat, part of Dark Peak, the Hollinwood Branch Canal and the Huddersfield Narrow Canal. The Huddersfield Narrow Canal runs for 20 miles (32 km) from Huddersfield to Ashton-under-Lyne; it is protected for its biological interest, and is "the best example of a flowing eutrophic water system in Greater Manchester".

There are three Scheduled Ancient Monuments in the borough, a Bronze Age cairn in Stalybridge, Buckton Castle, and Nico Ditch. Buckton Castle is a 12th-century enclosure castle near Carrbrook and was probably built by one of the earls of Chester. The castle lay ruinous by 1360, and has been described as "one of England's most important castles". Nico Ditch is an earthwork running from Ashton-under-Lyne in the east to Stretford in the west, in the borough of Trafford. It survives to a depth of 1.5 metres (4.9 ft) in some places and is up to 4 metres (13 ft) wide.

Tameside has nine conservation areas: Ashton and Stalybridge town centres; Carrbrook, Copley St. Paul's, and Millbrook in Stalybridge; Fairfield in Droylsden; Mottram-in-Longdendale; Portland Basin; and St. Anne's in Haughton.

The Museum of the Manchester Regiment is housed in Ashton-under-Lyne's town hall. The museum displays relics related to the Manchester Regiment including five Victoria Crosses awarded to members of the regiment. Park Bridge Heritage Centre in the Medlock Valley is a museum dedicated to the history of the settlement of Park Bridge and its industry. Broad Mills Heritage Site, in Broadbottom, preserves the remains of an early 19th-century textile works. Art galleries in the borough include Astley Cheetham Art Gallery in Stalybridge and Central Art Gallery in Ashton-under-Lyne.

Tameside has eight designated Local Nature Reserves which are Knott Hill, Hollinwood Branch Canal, Great Wood, Haughton Dale, Hulmes and Hardy Woods, Castle Clough and Cowbury Dale, Hurst Clough and Rocher Vale. Four more are to be designated.

== Education ==
Since 2007 Tameside's schools have been transformed as the result of multimillion-pound investment.

Virtually every high school has been replaced or remodelled. Eighteen primary schools have been rebuilt in recent years and another 20 have undergone major remodelling. In addition, the borough has opened the first entirely new schools in its history: Inspire Academy on Mossley Road, Ashton, and Discovery Academy off Porlock Avenue, Hattersley. Both offer 420 places plus a nursery.

In 2015, GCSE results improved more in Tameside than anywhere else in the North West, and the borough was one of the top 10 nationally for the most improved results.

At Key Stage 4 57.3% of pupils in the borough achieved five or more A* to C grades including English and maths – a 3.6% improvement on the previous year.

In terms of expected progress in English, 73% of pupils make expected progress in Tameside compared to 71% nationally. In maths 66% of pupils make expected progress, in line with the national average of 67%.

At Key Stage 2, 80% of pupils in Tameside achieved level 4+ in reading, writing and maths combined, sustaining the borough's 6% improvement in results from 2013 to 2014.

== Media ==
In terms of television, Tameside is served by BBC North West and ITV Granada broadcasting from the Winter Hill TV transmitter.

Radio stations for the area are:

- BBC Radio Manchester
- Heart North West
- Smooth North West
- Capital Manchester and Lancashire
- Greatest Hits Radio Manchester & The North West
- Tameside Radio, a community based station which broadcast from its studios in Ashton-under-Lyne.

The local newspaper is the Tameside Reporter, published on Thursdays.

== Transport ==
=== Railway ===
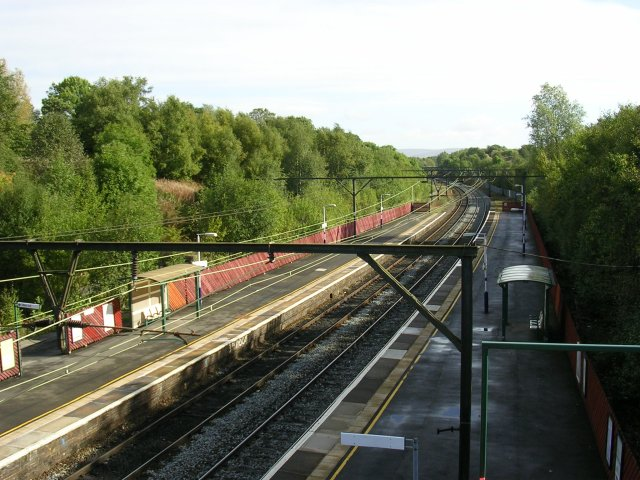
Fairfield railway station

The borough is served by 13 railway stations:

- Fairfield, Guide Bridge, Hyde Central and Hyde North are all on the Hope Valley Line between Sheffield and Manchester.
- Broadbottom, Flowery Field, Godley, Guide Bridge, Hattersley and Newton for Hyde are served by the Glossop Line between Glossop, Hadfield and Manchester.
- Ashton, Mossley and Stalybridge are on the Huddersfield Line.
- Denton is on the Stockport to Stalybridge Line.

=== Tram ===
Work on an extension of the Manchester Metrolink costing £260 million began in 2008. Trams began to run to Droylsden in February 2013 and finally to Ashton in September 2013.

=== Buses ===
Ashton bus station was converted into a new transport interchange. A covered concourse replaced the five island platforms and the site was linked to the Metrolink terminus. It has new waiting areas, bicycle parking and better access to travel information and tickets. Improved pedestrian routes can now take people into the town centre. It was completed in October 2020.

The new Hyde bus station opened on 23 August 2007, having cost £3.7 million to build.

=== Footpaths ===
Tameside Council is responsible for maintaining the public rights of way in the borough, including 145 miles (233 km) of footpaths.

== Twin towns ==
The Metropolitan Borough of Tameside has formal twinning links with places in China, France and Germany. (The arrangement with Mutare, Zimbabwe has been suspended due to the political unrest in that country.)

Some localities were originally twinned with a place within the Metropolitan Borough prior to its creation in 1974. In the list below the brackets show where the place was twinned with before 1974 and since when.

- Armentières, France, (Municipal Borough of Stalybridge, 1955)
- Bengbu, China, (Tameside 1995)
- Colmar, France, (Municipal Borough of Hyde, 1963)
- Champagnole, France (Municipal Borough of Dukinfield, 1958)
- Chaumont, France, (Municipal Borough of Ashton-under-Lyne, 1956)
- Hem, France, (Municipal Borough of Mossley, 1972)
- Kierspe, Germany (Denton Town Twinning Association, 1992 and 2012)
- Montigny-le-Bretonneux, France, (Denton Town Twinning Association, 1992 and 2012)
- Ruppichteroth, Germany, (Longdendale Urban District, 1974)
- Villemomble, France, (Droylsden Town Twinning Association, 1983)

== Sport ==
Tameside is home to a number of non-league football teams and a variety of other sports clubs.

The borough have several football teams playing across several levels of the National League System of Football, commonly known as Non League Football, of which several have played as high as the National League Tier 5.

National League North (Tier 6)

- Curzon Ashton

Northern Premier League (Tier 7)

- Hyde United
- Stalybridge Celtic
- Ashton United

(Tier 8)

- Mossley

Only Stalybridge Celtic have played in the Football League, where they were members between 1919 and 1922.

Outside the NLS System, Dukinfield Town (Manchester League Premier Division, Tier 11) and Denton Town (Cheshire League Second Division, Tier 12)

Droylsden are currently inactive following the events of COVID-19 however have played host to Stretford Paddock from their expansion from Sunday League to the NLS System, and currently play in the Cheshire League Second Division.

Tameside has been home to three players who have been members of winning World Cup squads. Geoff Hurst and James Arnfield were members of the 1966 World Cup winning England side, whilst Simone Perrotta won the World Cup in 2006 with Italy, though he was born in Ashton. All three have been given a statue outside Curzon Ashton's Tameside Stadium.

The Region hosts 2 Rugby Union sides, with Aldwynians the highest ranked side, Currently playing in the ADM Lancashire and Cheshire 1st Division while Ashton Under Lyne RFC play in the 11th Tier. Eric Evans, who was Aldwynians Captain represented England between 1956-58.

Though the Borough does not have a Professional Rugby League side, Oldham Rugby League have played at several Grounds across Tameside. In 2003 they played several Challenge Cup and League games at Ashton United's Hurst Cross ground, whilst in more modern times when playing Super League sides or when in the Championship Division have played at Stalybridge Celtic's Bower Fold as their regular home isn't suitable for higher division games.

Cricket is heavily represented in the area with all areas hosting several sides with the Greater Manchester Cricket League, Denton having the most within the higher tiers of the League System (Denton St Lawrence and Denton West Cricket Club both playing in the Premier Division), Mottram being represented in the Top Division by Roe Cross and Mottram CC in the third level of the League, Hyde are represented with Flowery Field CC in the 2nd tier and Dukinfield CC in the Tier 3 Championship Division.

Tameside Netball Club play in the Highest Amateur Division of the sport (formally the Top Division before the introduction of the Professional Super League)

== See also ==
- Healthcare in Greater Manchester
- 2007 Tameside Council election
- Tameside local elections
