= Shaw Hall factory =

Cotton mill in Greater Manchester, England

Coordinates: 53.463°N 2.052°W

Shaw Hall factory was a 19th century cotton mill in lower Matley, Hyde, Greater Manchester in which nearly 200 people worked. The mill is marked as Shawhall Mill and Mount Pleasant Mill in maps of 1898 and 1910, respectively.

== History ==
The cotton mill was built during the Industrial Revolution in the early 19th century. It was run as the Shaw Hall Cotton Spinning Company and owned by the Ashton Brothers & Co Ltd. It was located where present-day Shaw Hall Avenue is. The factory was demolished in the 1920s to make way for the street.

== Fires ==
The factory had many fires in its time, with there being multiple fatal events. The original millstones and bricks still have smoke stains on them and were used for walls of houses built in the 1930s. Some curved bricks have been found at the site of the mill.
