= Flowery Field =

Coordinates: 53.456°N 2.083°W

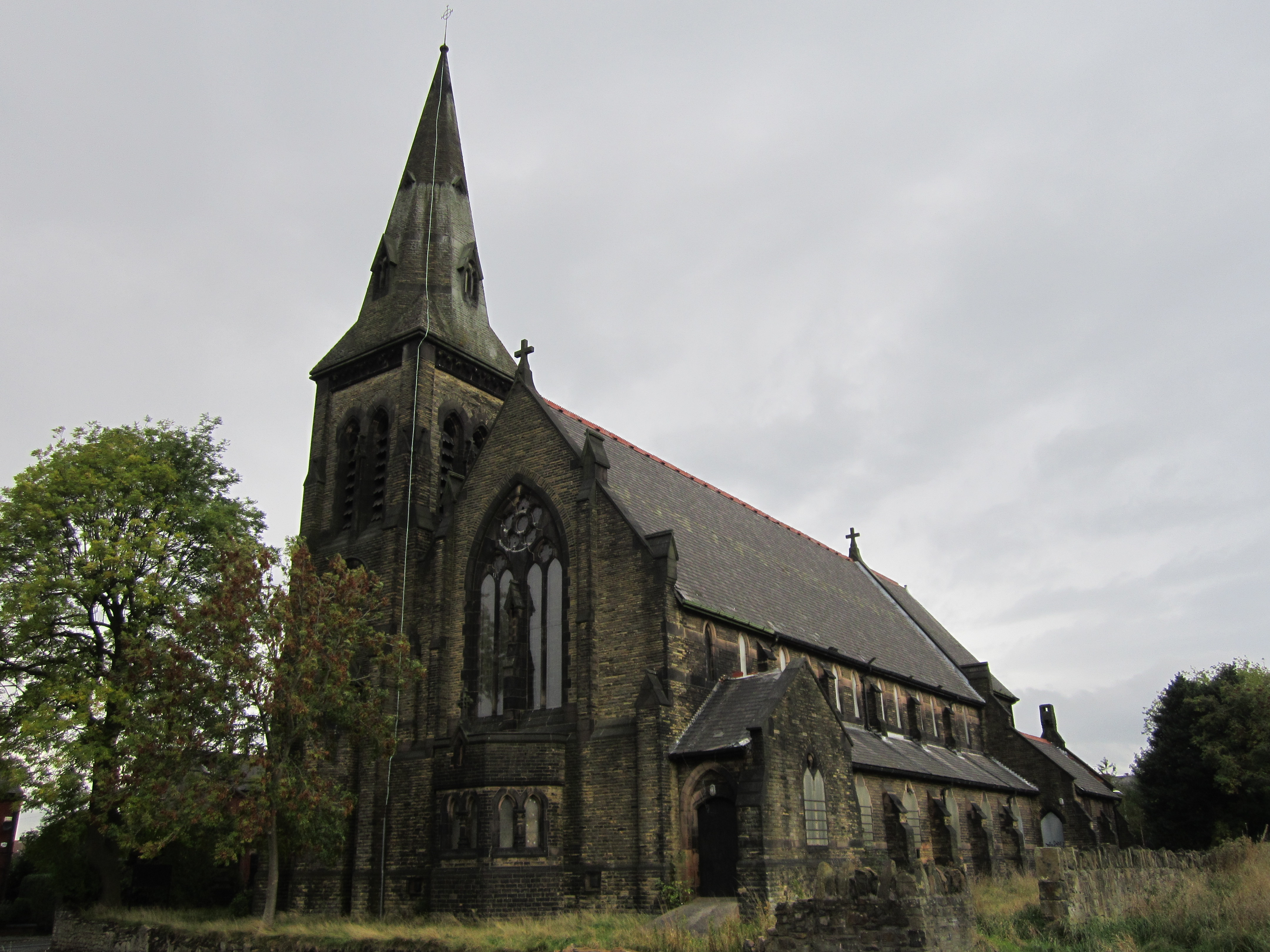
- St Stephen's Church, Flowery Field

- Location within Greater Manchester
- Population: 3,000 Estimated
- OS grid reference: SJ944955
- Metropolitan borough: Tameside
- Metropolitan county: Greater Manchester
- Region: North West
- Country: England
- Sovereign state: United Kingdom
- Post town: HYDE
- Postcode district: SK14
- Dialling code: 0161
- Police: Greater Manchester
- Fire: Greater Manchester
- Ambulance: North West
- UK Parliament: Stalybridge and Hyde

Flowery Field is an area of Hyde, Greater Manchester, England. It is a mainly residential area once dominated by Ashton Brothers's textile mill.

== Cricket ==
The area is home to Flowery Field Cricket Club. An early member for them was Warren Bradley, who later played football for Manchester United.

== Education ==
Schools in the area include Hyde High School and Flowery Field Primary School and Nursery.

Hyde Community College is a secondary school in the area. It is noted for its ICT teaching. The school has a rich history in the area and has been on its current site since the 1940s. As part of the governments building schools for the future programme, the school was completely rebuilt and was opened in November 2012.

Flowery Field infants and junior schools are now in a combined building on the original site which opened in January 2015.

== Transport ==
Flowery Field railway station is located on the Glossop line. Trains run in each direction at least twice per hour. In the peak times this increases to 3 or 4 every hour in each direction.

Another station nearby, Hyde North, accommodates the Manchester Piccadilly to Rose Hill Marple line, which runs slightly less regularly than the Glossop line. There is no service from Hyde North on Sundays and in the evenings after 8:30 PM.

Buses include the 330 Stockport to Ashton via Hyde and Woodley, Greater Manchester. This service is run by Bee Network and operates every twelve mins each way, 4:51 AM to 00:30 AM Monday to Saturday and every twenty mins each way on Sundays and evenings past 8:00 PM.

The 343 runs from Hyde to Oldham via Mossley. This service is run by Bee Network and operates every sixty mins each way, on the weekdays service operates from 5:50 AM to 6PM. On Saturdays, service operates from 7:20AM to 5:25PM hourly. On Sundays service is every 2 hours from 8:30AM to 4:30PM. On the weekend and during school holidays this bus route does not call at Mossley Hollins High School

== Facilities ==
Flowery Field Church is a Tudor Gothic-style building, designed by the architect Thomas Worthington, and was completed in 1878. Thomas Ashton (who owned the cotton mill across the road) built the church at his own expense and donated it to the congregation as a sacred trust. During the build the congregation were tasked with raising £1000, which was a huge amount at that time. Upon completion Thomas Ashton then made a magnificent gesture by returning this sum on condition that the money be invested and the interest used to augment a Minister's stipend. The church still has weekly services and an active social calendar, and is open to any denomination as a Free Christian Fellowship.
