= Flowery Field railway station =

Railway station in Greater Manchester, England

Coordinates: 53.462°N 2.081°W

Flowery Field
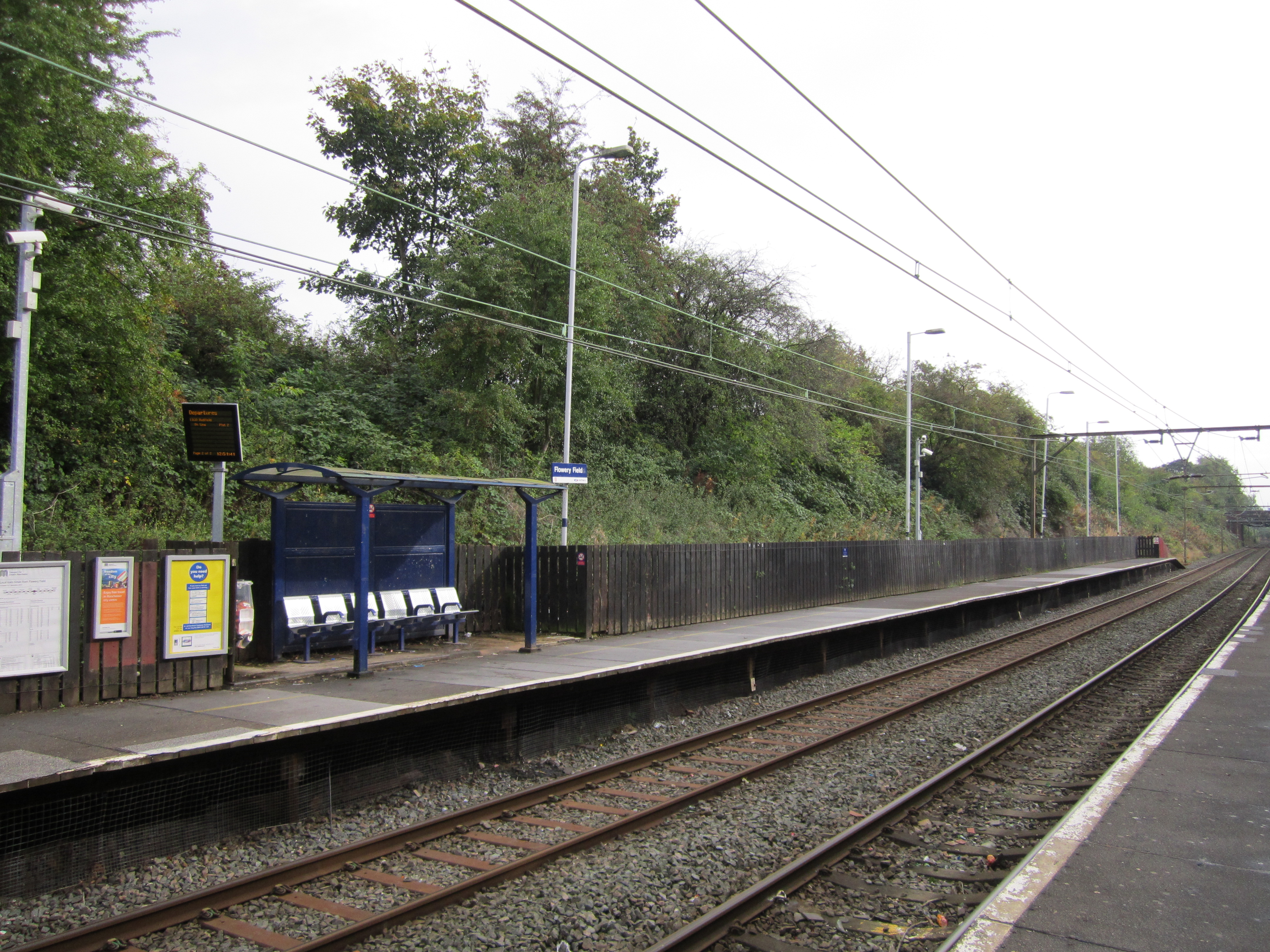
- Flowery Field station

General information
- Location: Hyde, Tameside; England
- Grid reference: SJ947960
- Manager: Northern Trains
- Platforms: 2

Other information
- Station code: FLF
- Classification: DfT category F2

History
- Opened: May 1985

Passengers
- 2020/21: ▼66,500
- 2021/22: ▲0.163 million
- 2022/23: ▼0.145 million
- 2023/24: ▲0.164 million
- 2024/25: ▲0.184 million
Location
Notes
- Passenger statistics from the Office of Rail and Road

Flowery Field railway station serves the Flowery Field area of Hyde, Greater Manchester, England. It is 7 miles (11 km) east of Manchester Piccadilly on the Manchester-Glossop Line. The station is managed by Northern Trains.

== History ==
The station was opened in 1985, and is mainly a wooden structure, similar in design to Godley railway station, which is also on the Glossop Line. The station was opened by British Rail.

== Facilities ==
As part of the failed Manchester TIF bid, the station would have been refurbished with CCTV, real-time passenger information and additional seating and shelters. The bid failed after residents of Greater Manchester voted against the congestion charge. However, funding was secured from Transport for Greater Manchester in 2011, for the installation of CCTV, departure screens, a Public Announcement System and help points.

In 2026, work to install lifts and improve the station lighting had commenced; the estimated completion was summer 2028.

== Services ==
There is a half-hourly daily service to Manchester Piccadilly and to Hadfield (with extra trains during weekday peak periods). Trains operate hourly during the evening.

Preceding station	National Rail	Following station
Guide Bridge	Northern Trains Manchester-Glossop Line	Newton for Hyde
