= Newton for Hyde railway station =

Railway station in Greater Manchester, England

Newton for Hyde
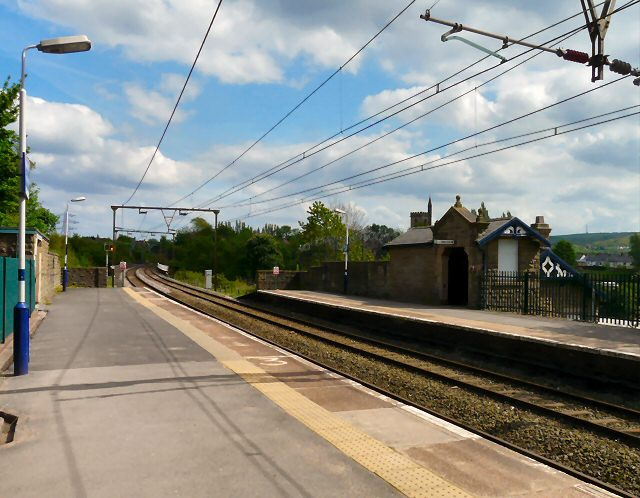

General information
- Location: Hyde, Tameside, England
- Coordinates: 53.457°N 2.067°W
- Grid reference: SJ956955
- Managed by: Northern Trains
- Transit authority: Transport for Greater Manchester
- Platforms: 2

Other information
- Station code: NWN
- Classification: DfT category E

History
- Original company: Sheffield, Ashton-under-Lyne and Manchester Railway
- Pre-grouping: Great Central Railway
- Post-grouping: London and North Eastern Railway

Key dates
- 17 November 1841: Opened as Newton and Hyde
- 1 March 1858: Renamed Newton for Hyde

Passengers
- 2020/21: ▼47,768
- 2021/22: ▲0.113 million
- 2022/23: ▼0.107 million
- 2023/24: ▲0.127 million
- 2024/25: ▲0.140 million
Location
Notes
- Passenger statistics from the Office of Rail and Road

Newton for Hyde railway station serves the Newton area of Hyde, in Greater Manchester, England. It lies 7 1/2 miles (12.1 km) east of Manchester Piccadilly and is managed by Northern Trains.

== History ==
The station was opened by the Sheffield, Ashton-Under-Lyne and Manchester Railway as Newton and Hyde in 1841; however, the station signage referred to the station as Newton. Trains ran originally between Manchester London Road and Sheffield Victoria on the Woodhead Line. A railway yard lay immediately to the south, bounded by Sheffield Road; the remains of a covered shed being visible on the westbound platform.

The line was electrified in 1953 and closed to passengers between Hadfield and Penistone in 1970.

The official name on tickets is Newton for Hyde; to avoid confusion with Newton station in South Lanarkshire, new signage was installed from July 2007.

== Facilities ==
The station has a main building and ticket office at street level; this is staffed six days per week on a part-time basis, on mornings and early afternoons only. Waiting shelters, CIS displays, timetable information posters and bench seating are provided at platform level. The subway linking the platforms and ticket hall has steps, but level access is possible to the eastbound platform only via Danby Road.

The station unusually features both a covered subway underneath the platforms and a larger viaduct tunnel accessible from both sides, meaning there are two ways to cross platforms underground. The eastern side of the station containing these passageways is raised on the viaduct.

== Services ==
Northern Trains generally operates the following service, in trains per hour (tph):

- 2 tph to Manchester Piccadilly
- 2 tph to Hadfield, via Glossop.

Additional weekday peak extras and an hourly evening service run in each direction. Early morning, late evening and rush hour services start or terminate at Glossop.

| Preceding station | National Rail | Following station |
|---|---|---|
| Flowery Field | Northern Trains Glossop Line | Godley |
Historical railways
| Guide Bridge Line and station open | Manchester, Sheffield and Lincolnshire Railway Woodhead Line | Godley Junction Line open, station closed |

== Onward connections ==
Metroline Manchester operates bus route 346, which connects Ashton-Under-Lyne and Hyde calls 100 metres (109 yd) north-east of the westbound platforms.

== Gallery ==
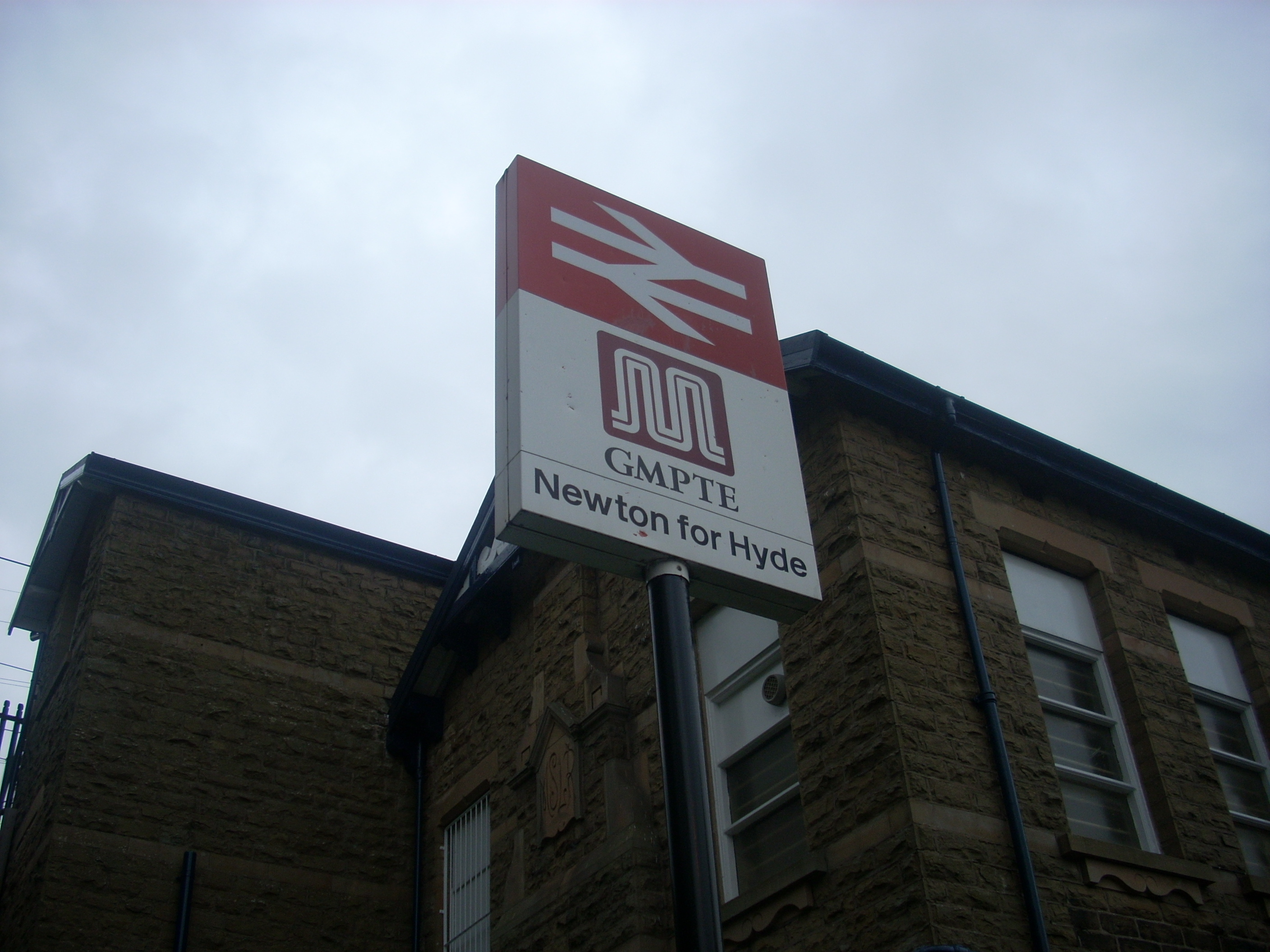
Station sign

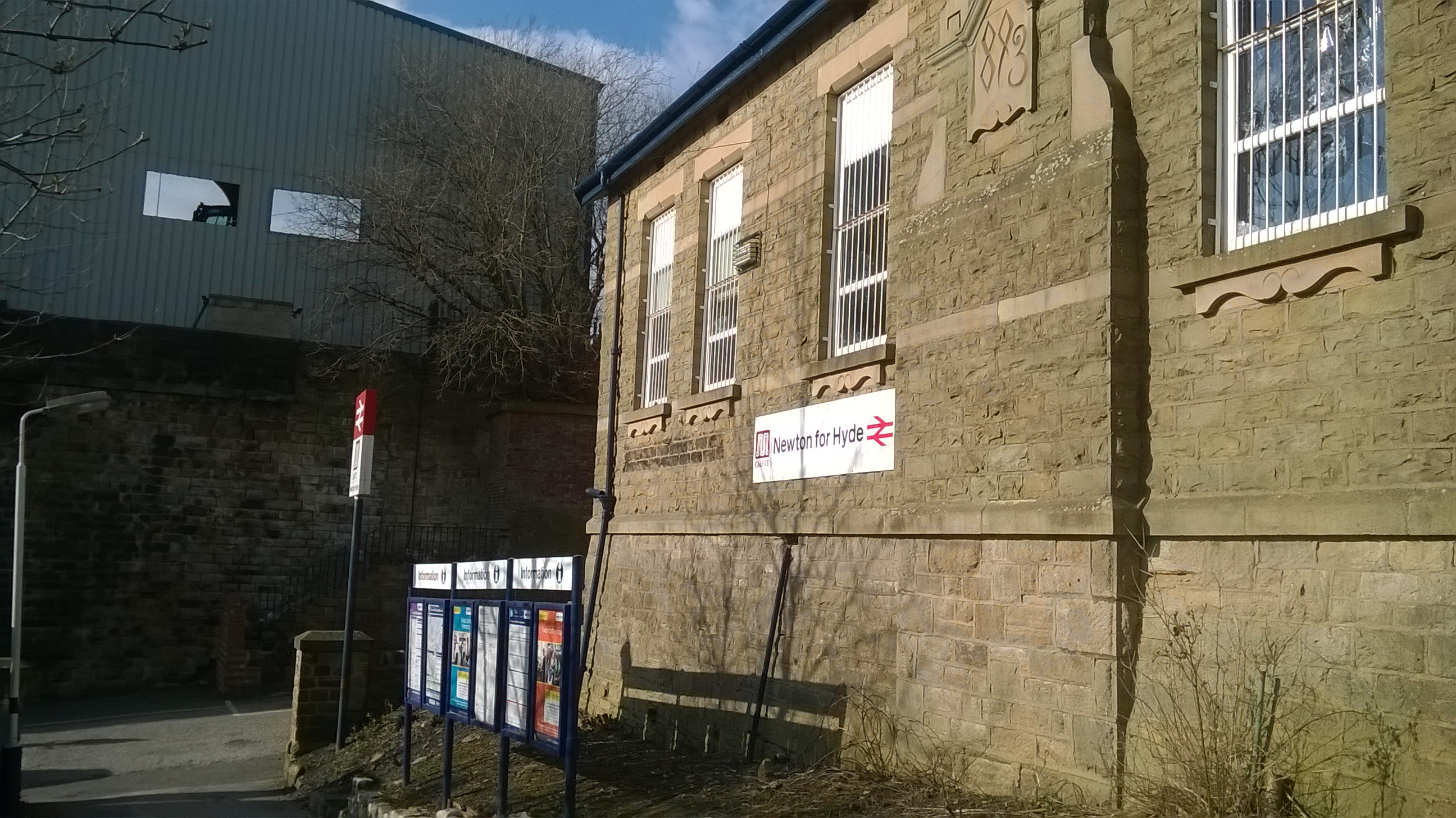
Station building and ticket office

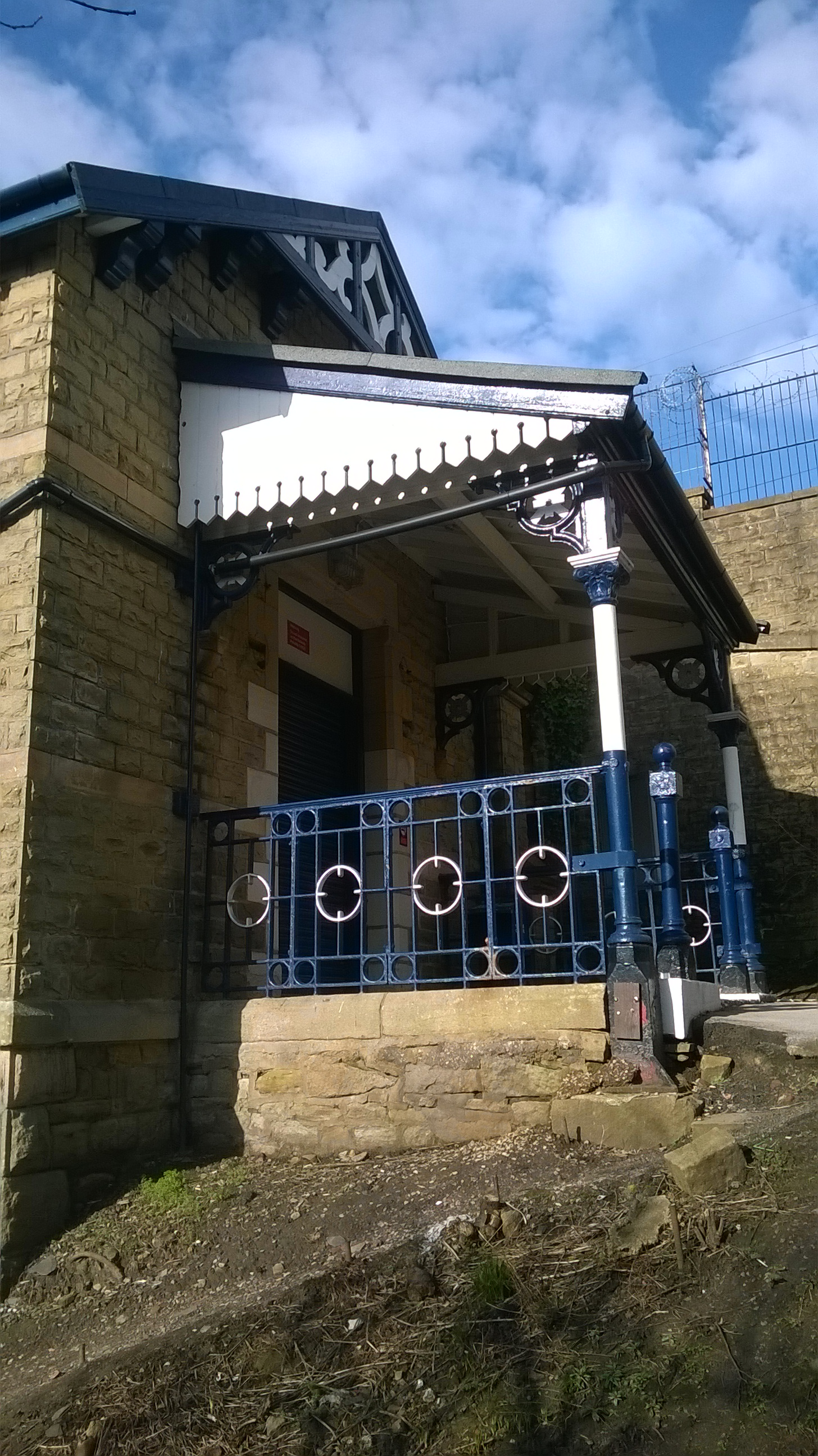
Station building entrance
