= Hattersley =

Area of Tameside, Greater Manchester, England

Coordinates: 53.4479°N 2.0278°W

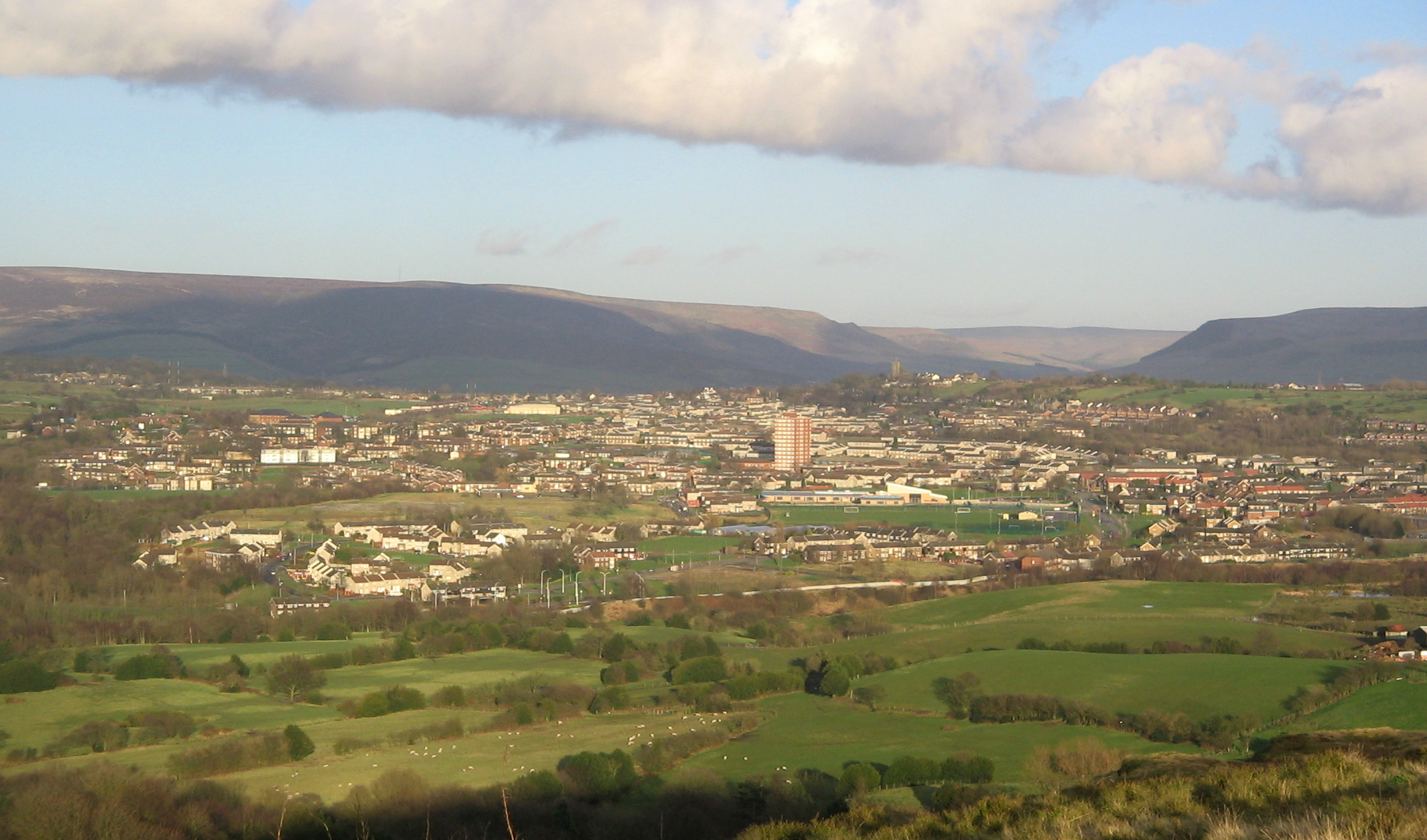
- A view over Hattersley, from Werneth Low

- Location within Greater Manchester
- Population: 6,960 (Built-up area, 2021)
- OS grid reference: SJ982945
- Metropolitan borough: Tameside
- Metropolitan county: Greater Manchester
- Region: North West
- Country: England
- Sovereign state: United Kingdom
- Post town: HYDE
- Postcode district: SK14
- Dialling code: 0161
- Police: Greater Manchester
- Fire: Greater Manchester
- Ambulance: North West
- UK Parliament: Stalybridge and Hyde

Hattersley is a housing estate in the Tameside district of Greater Manchester, England, 1.5 miles (2.4 km) east of Hyde, 4 miles (6.4 km) west of Glossop and 10 miles (16 km) east of Manchester, at the eastern terminus of the M67. The estate had a population of 6,960 at the 2021 census. It lies within the historic county boundaries of Cheshire, and became part of Greater Manchester in 1974. The area was developed as a large overspill estate by Manchester City Council from the 1960s onwards.

== History ==
Hattersley was historically a township in the ancient parish of Mottram-in-Longdendale, which formed part of the Macclesfield Hundred of Cheshire. From the 17th century onwards, parishes were gradually given various civil functions under the poor laws, in addition to their original ecclesiastical functions. In some cases, including Mottram-in-Longdendale, the civil functions were exercised by each township separately rather than the parish as a whole. In 1866, the legal definition of 'parish' was changed to be the areas used for administering the poor laws, and so Hattersley became a civil parish.

When elected parish and district councils were created in 1894, Hattersley was included in the Tintwistle Rural District. The parish was too small to qualify for a parish council, and so was given a parish meeting instead. The parish was abolished in 1936. Its former area was split between the neighbouring borough of Hyde and the new Longdendale Urban District. At the 1931 census (the last before the abolition of the parish), Hattlersley had a population of 280.

=== Construction of the estate ===
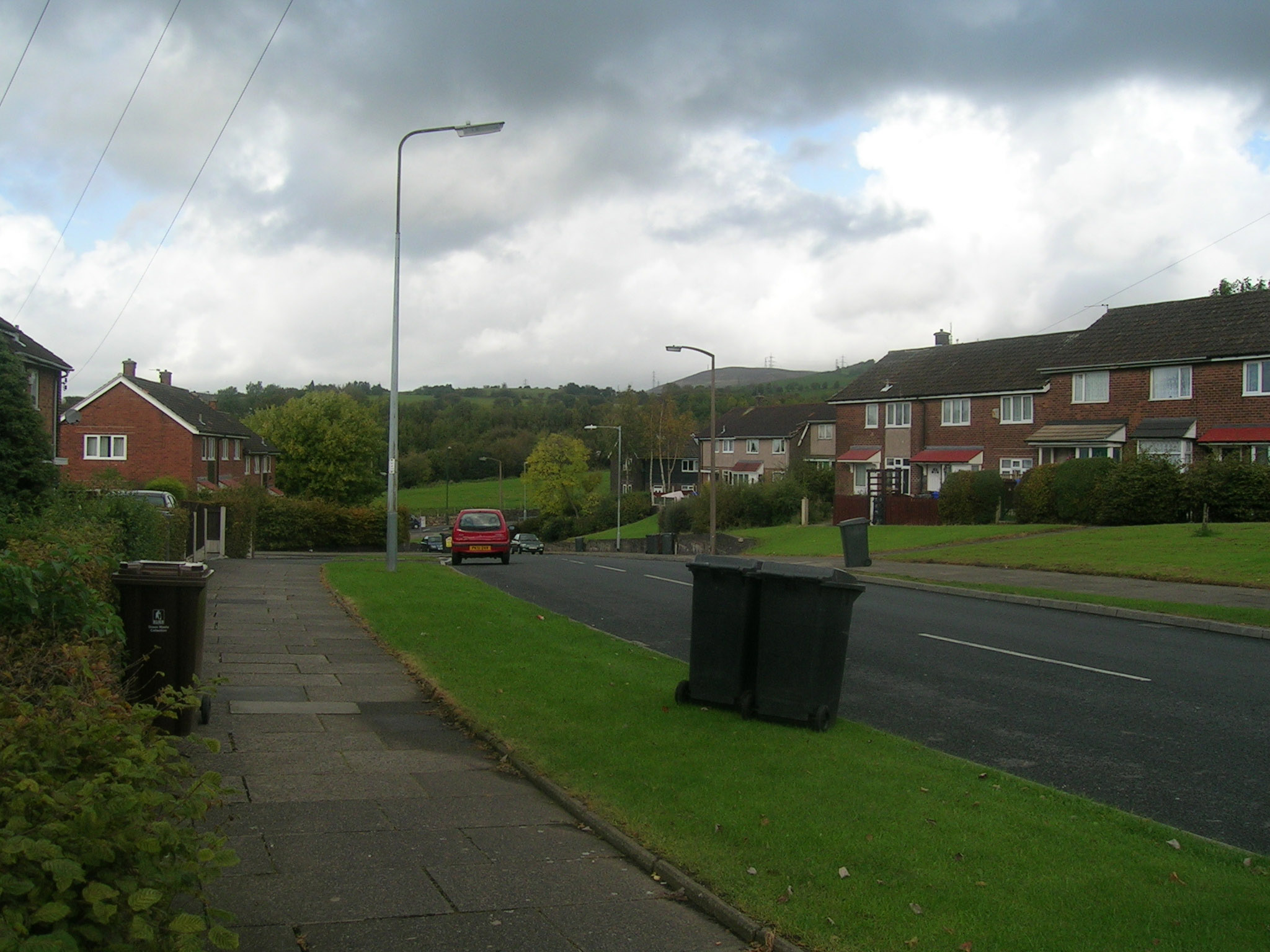
Council homes originally built by Manchester in the 1960s

At the beginning of the 1960s, most of the area was purchased by Manchester City Council to build a large overspill estate, which became home to many families rehoused from inner-city slum areas like Gorton. Another similar estate was built in nearby Gamesley. Both these estates consist primarily of council houses.

=== Renewal and privatisation ===
Regeneration in Hattersley is coordinated by Hattersley Neighbourhood Partnership.

The city council transferred control of most of Hattersley's housing stock to Peak Valley Housing Association in 2006 after an attempt to transfer it to the Harvest Housing Group which collapsed when a £20 million gap in funding to refurbish the homes to new housing standards was identified. The transfer brought a £40 million, seven-year improvement plan for existing housing tied to a £140m investment from a private developer.

Selective demolition has begun to remove some obsolete housing leaving space for redevelopment and investment in education and public services. Seven tower blocks were demolished in 2001. Demolition of some of the 1960s low-rise houses on the estate took place in 2007 and 2008, these houses having deteriorated to a condition where refurbishment was not viable, in spite of these houses being just over 40 years old.

In 2012 a Tesco supermarket was opened, despite residents' concern about extra traffic.

=== Moors Murders ===
Moors murderer Myra Hindley and her grandmother Ellen Maybury, together with Hindley's boyfriend Ian Brady, were rehoused in Hattersley from Gorton in 1964 and lived at a new council house in the area – 16 Wardle Brook Avenue – for approximately 12 months until Hindley and Brady were arrested in October 1965. They had already carried out three murders, with the victims being buried on Saddleworth Moor, at that time still undetected, before they moved to Hattersley.

Brady spent much of his time at the house with Hindley and together they carried out their final two killings – that of 10-year-old Lesley Ann Downey on Boxing Day 1964, and 17-year-old Edward Evans in October 1965 – at the house; they had already committed three murders while living in Gorton.

The body of Lesley Ann Downey was buried on nearby Saddleworth Moor the day after her murder on Boxing Day 1964, and found there during the initial search of the moors nearly a year later, but the body of Edward Evans was found locked in a bedroom at the house before the couple could dispose of it; the police then went on to find the evidence to link Brady and Hindley to the earlier murders. Brady and Hindley were sentenced to life imprisonment in May 1966, both remaining imprisoned until their deaths.

In October 1987, Manchester City Council demolished the house as they could not find tenants willing to live there. The site of the house remains vacant, although the surrounding houses remain standing.

=== Dale Cregan ===
On 18 September 2012, drug dealer Dale Cregan made a hoax emergency call to the police from an address in Mottram, luring Police Constables Nicola Hughes, 23, and Fiona Bone, 32, of Greater Manchester Police there by claiming that there had been an incident of criminal damage. When they arrived, he ambushed the constables, shooting them and throwing an M75 hand grenade at them. Both officers were hit by at least eight bullets as Cregan fired 32 shots in 31 seconds. He later turned himself in at Hyde police station and was charged with their murders.

== Community and regeneration ==
Hattersley had a monthly community newspaper, the Hattersley & Mottram Community News, produced by local people; it ceased publication in 2011, after Tameside Council ended its funding. It is home to no. 468 (Hyde and Hatterley) Squadron Air Cadets.

Hattersley is now home to both a brand-new community hub and a library. Many new developments have been important in kick-starting the regeneration of the Hattersley district; these include new housing, a large Tesco Extra superstore and Adventure Longdendale (a trampolining, Laser Quest and play centre). There are also plans for Hattersley Retail Park; this was originally scheduled to open in 2021, but has faced multiple setbacks.

== Transport ==
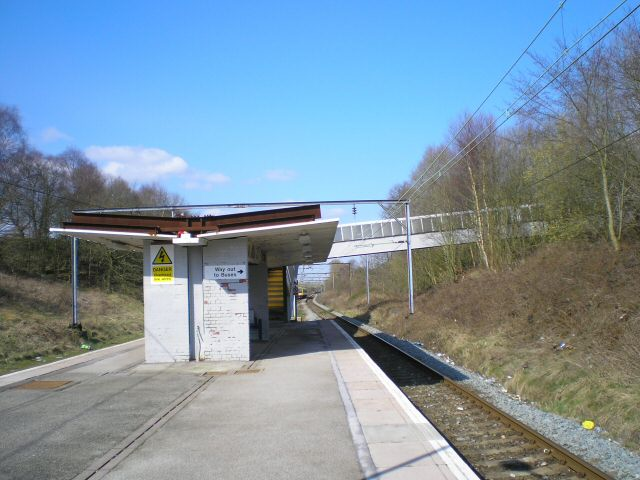
Hattersley railway station

Hattersley railway station serves the area; it is on the Glossop line between Manchester Piccadilly, Glossop and Hadfield. There is a generally half-hourly service in both directions, operated by Northern Trains.

Bus services are provided by Metroline Manchester and Go North West under the Bee Network scheme. There are frequent services to Manchester city centre on route 201.

== Notable people ==
- Ricky Hatton, the former two-weight world champion boxer, grew up on the estate.
- Shayne Ward, from Hattersley, was on The X Factor.

== See also ==
- Listed buildings in Longdendale
