= Hattersley railway station =

Railway station in Greater Manchester, England

Hattersley
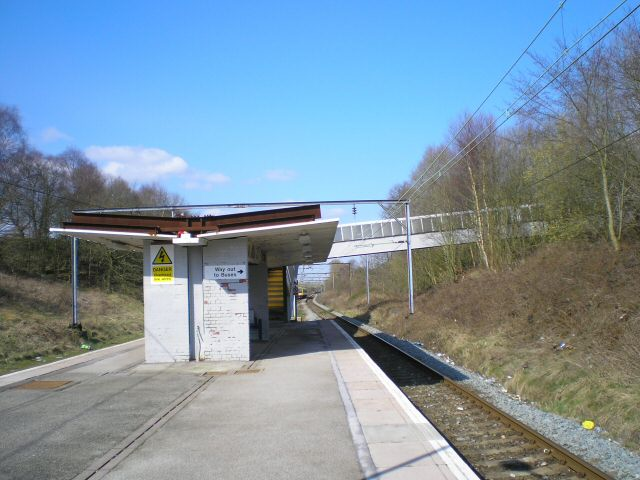

General information
- Location: Hattersley, Tameside; England
- Coordinates: 53.445°N 2.040°W
- Grid reference: SJ974942
- Manager: Northern Trains
- Transit authority: Transport for Greater Manchester
- Platforms: 2

Other information
- Station code: HTY
- Classification: DfT category E

History
- Original company: British Railways Board

Key dates
- 8 May 1978: Station opened

Passengers
- 2020/21: ▼25,572
- 2021/22: ▲69,128
- 2022/23: ▲69,456
- 2023/24: ▲84,512
- 2024/25: ▲87,516
Location
Notes
- Passenger statistics from the Office of Rail and Road

Hattersley railway station serves the Hattersley area of Tameside, Greater Manchester, England. The station is 9 miles (14 km) east of Manchester Piccadilly on the Manchester-Glossop Line.

The station was opened by British Rail in 1978 as an island platform with a covered footbridge leading to the station's exit. It used to contain a glass waiting room/area, but this was later subjected to an arson attack. Hattersley has been served by 3-car trains throughout its life, but has an extended platform that can comfortably accommodate 6-car trains. It has car parking spaces and formerly incorporated a bus interchange which was served by the number 216 bus before continuing through Hattersley to the terminus or going to Hyde and Manchester. The station and the line around 1km to the east of it is currently within a substantial cutting, a new Hattersley Viaduct replacing two tunnels some 400m in length which were likely required to be removed as part of the post-war electrification works.

== Facilities ==
The station has a ticket office at street level which is staffed six days per week on a part-time basis (Mondays-Fridays 06:20 - 13:25, Saturdays 07:00 - 14:00, closed Sundays). Outside these times tickets must be purchased on the train or prior to travel. The only amenities at platform level are a brick shelter (with canopy), timetable posters and lighting. The entrance and platform are connected via a covered walkway with steps, so no level access is possible for mobility-impaired or wheelchair users.

== Services ==
Monday to Saturday during the daytime, trains run every 30 minutes to Manchester and to Hadfield; extra services run in the weekday business peaks, but trains run every hour after 20.00. On Sundays train services run every 30 minutes to Manchester and to Hadfield until the evening. Early morning, rush hour and late evening services start or terminate at Glossop.

Preceding station	National Rail	Following station
Godley	Northern Trains Manchester-Glossop Line	Broadbottom
