= List of schools in Tameside =

This is a list of schools in the Metropolitan Borough of Tameside in the English county of Greater Manchester.

== State-funded schools ==
=== Primary schools ===
- Aldwyn Primary School, Audenshaw
- Arlies Primary School, Stalybridge
- Arundale Primary School, Mottram in Longdendale
- Ashton West End Primary Academy, Ashton-under-Lyne
- Audenshaw Primary School, Audenshaw
- Bradley Green Primary Academy, Newton
- Broadbent Fold Primary School and Nursery, Dukinfield
- Broadbottom CE Primary School, Broadbottom
- Buckton Vale Primary School, Carrbrook
- Canon Burrows CE Primary School, Ashton-under-Lyne
- Canon Johnson CE Primary School, Ashton-under-Lyne
- Corrie Primary School, Denton
- Dane Bank Primary School, Dane Bank
- Denton West End Primary School, Denton
- Discovery Academy, Hattersley
- Dowson Primary Academy, Hyde
- Endeavour Primary Academy, Hyde
- Fairfield Road Primary School, Droylsden
- Flowery Field Primary School, Hyde
- Gee Cross Holy Trinity CE Primary School, Gee Cross
- Godley Community Primary Academy, Godley
- Gorse Hall Primary and Nursery School, Stalybridge
- Greenfield Primary Academy, Hyde
- Greenside Primary School, Droylsden
- Greswell Primary School and Nursery, Denton
- The Heys Primary School, Ashton-under-Lyne
- Holden Clough Community Primary School, Ashton-under-Lyne
- Hollingworth Primary School, Hollingworth
- Holy Trinity CE Primary School, Ashton-under-Lyne
- Hurst Knoll St James' CE Primary School, Ashton-under-Lyne
- Inspire Academy, Ashton-under-Lyne
- Linden Road Academy, Denton
- Livingstone Primary School, Mossley
- Lyndhurst Community Primary School, Dukinfield
- Manchester Road Primary Academy, Droylsden
- Manor Green Primary Academy, Haughton Green
- Micklehurst All Saints CE Primary School, Mossley
- Millbrook Primary School, Stalybridge
- Milton St John's CE Primary School, Mossley
- Moorside Primary School, Droylsden
- Mottram CE Primary School, Mottram in Longdendale
- Oakfield Primary School, Hyde
- Oasis Academy Broadoak, Ashton-under-Lyne
- Our Lady of Mount Carmel RC Primary School, Ashton-under-Lyne
- Parochial CE Primary School, Ashton-under-Lyne
- Pinfold Primary School, Hattersley
- Poplar Street Primary School, Audenshaw
- Ravensfield Primary School, Dukinfield
- Rosehill Methodist Primary Academy, Ashton-under-Lyne
- Russell Scott Primary School, Denton
- St Anne's Primary School, Denton
- St Anne's RC Primary School, Audenshaw
- St Christopher's RC Primary School, Ashton-under-Lyne
- St George's CE Primary School, Hyde
- St George's CE Primary School, Mossley
- St James' CE Primary School, Ashton-under-Lyne
- St James' RC Primary School, Hattersley
- St John Fisher RC Primary School, Haughton Green
- St John's CE Primary School, Dukinfield
- St Joseph's RC Primary School, Mossley
- St Mary's CE Primary School, Droylsden
- St Mary's RC Primary School, Denton
- St Mary's RC Primary School, Dukinfield
- St Paul's CE Primary School, Stalybridge
- St Paul's RC Primary School, Hyde
- St Peter's CE Primary School, Ashton-under-Lyne
- St Peter's RC Primary School, Stalybridge
- St Raphael's RC Primary School, Millbrook
- St Stephen's CE Primary School, Audenshaw
- St Stephen's RC Primary School, Droylsden
- Silver Springs Primary Academy, Stalybridge
- Stalyhill Infant School, Stalybridge
- Stalyhill Junior School, Stalybridge
- Waterloo Primary School, Ashton-under-Lyne
- Wild Bank Primary School, Stalybridge
- Yew Tree Primary School, Dukinfield

=== Secondary schools ===
- Alder Community High School, Gee Cross
- All Saints Catholic College, Dukinfield
- Audenshaw School, Audenshaw
- Copley Academy, Stalybridge
- Denton Community College, Denton
- Droylsden Academy, Droylsden
- Fairfield High School for Girls, Droylsden
- Great Academy Ashton, Ashton-under-Lyne
- Hyde High School, Hyde
- Laurus Ryecroft, Droylsden
- Longdendale High School, Hollingworth
- Mossley Hollins High School, Mossley
- Rayner Stephens High School, Dukinfield
- St Damian's RC Science College, Ashton-under-Lyne
- St Thomas More RC College, Denton
- West Hill School, Stalybridge

=== Special and alternative schools ===
- Cromwell High School, Dukinfield
- Hawthorns School, Audenshaw
- Oakdale School, Dukinfield
- Samuel Laycock School, Ashton-under-Lyne
- Tameside Pupil Referral Service, Dukinfield
- Thomas Ashton School, Hyde

=== Further education ===
- Ashton Sixth Form College, Ashton-under-Lyne
- Clarendon Sixth Form College, Ashton-under-lyne
- Tameside College, Ashton-under-Lyne

== Independent schools ==
=== Senior and all-through schools ===
- Trinity School, Stalybridge

=== Special and alternative schools ===
- Ashlea House School, Denton
- Brambles School, Mottram in Longdendale
- Greater Manchester Alternative Provision, Ashton-under-Lyne
- Lawrence House, Park Bridge
- The Limes Meadow School, Ashton-under-Lyne
- Safe Start Education, Ashton-under-Lyne
