= Tintwistle Rural District =

Former local government area in the UK

Coordinates: 53°28′18″N 1°58′18″W

Tintwistle
- Tintwistle RD within Cheshire in 1970
- Area
  - 1911: 13,619 acres (55.11 km^{2})
  - 1961: 11,855 acres (47.98 km^{2})
- Population
  - 1901: 2,105
  - 1971: 1,477
- History
  - Created: 1894
  - Abolished: 1974
  - Succeeded by: High Peak
- Status: Rural district

Tintwistle Rural District was a local government district in north east Cheshire, England from 1894 to 1974.

It was created a rural district by the Local Government Act 1894 from the part of the Ashton-under-Lyne rural sanitary district which was in Cheshire. It consisted of the civil parishes of:

- Tintwistle
- Hattersley (until 1936)
- Matley (until 1936)

Hattersley and Matley formed an exclave of the district. They were abolished in 1936 and their area transferred to the Municipal Borough of Hyde, the Municipal Borough of Dukinfield, Longdendale Urban District and the Municipal Borough of Stalybridge.

In 1974 the district was abolished. At that time, much of north east Cheshire became part of Greater Manchester. Instead of becoming part of that county, or forming an exclave of Cheshire, Tintwistle became part of the High Peak district of Derbyshire.
