= Listed buildings in Longdendale =

Longdendale is a valley, part of which is in Tameside, Greater Manchester, England. In the valley are the villages of Broadbottom, Hattersley, Hollingworth and Mottram in Longdendale. These villages and the surrounding countryside contain 56 listed buildings that are recorded in the National Heritage List for England. Of these, three are listed at Grade II*, the middle grade, and the others are at Grade II, the lowest grade. The listed buildings include houses and associated structures, farmhouses, farm buildings, churches and items in churchyards, an ancient cross, a railway viaduct, a school, and two war memorials.

== Key ==
Grade	Criteria
II*	Particularly important buildings of more than special interest
II	Buildings of national importance and special interest

== Buildings ==
Name and location	Photograph	Date	Notes	Grade
Cross, Mottram in Longdendale; 53.45391°N 2.01036°W		Medieval	The cross was considerably restored in 1760, and again in 1897 to commemorate the diamond jubilee of Queen Victoria. It has a circular stepped plinth, an octagonal shaft with a moulded base and a foliated capital, on which is a cubical sundial with three copper faces. There are inscriptions on the face and the plinth.	II*
St Michael and All Angels Church, Mottram; 53.45443°N 2.01020°W		15th century	The tower dates from about 1486, and in 1854–55 E. H. Shellard added the vestry and altered the clerestory and the interior. The church is in stone with a stone-slate roof, and is in Perpendicular style. It consists of a nave with a clerestory, north and south aisles with chapels, a south porch, a chancel with a north vestry, and a west tower. Along the sides of the church are embattled parapets. The tower has four stages, angled buttresses, a three-light west window, a clock face, a stair turret, and n embattled parapet with crocketed pinnacles.	II*
Old Hillend Farmhouse, Broadbottom; 53.44709°N 2.01528°W	—	1604	The farmhouse has been much altered, and later used for other purposes. It is in stone on a plinth, with quoins, a roof of slate and stone-slate, and a rear wall of brick. There are two storeys, two bays, and a one-bay cottage added as a wing to the left in the 18th century. In the centre is a two-storey porch that has a doorway with a chamfered surround and a dated lintel, above which is a band, a window, and a coped gable with a dove hole. The windows are mullioned, and there are inserted 19th-century doors.	II
Outbuildings, Hollingworth Hall Farm; 53.47629°N 1.99866°W		17th century (or earlier)	A range of farm buildings of different dates and different types, the oldest being a cruck-framed structure. The buildings are in stone with a stone-slate roof, and have an L-shaped plan. The openings include cart entries, doors, windows some of which are mullioned, a winnowing door, and vents.	II
Botham's Hall; 53.43351°N 2.02726°W		Late 17th century	A stone house with a stone-slate roof on a projecting plinth, with two storeys and attics. It has a T-shaped plan, consisting of a main range and a later wing. The original part has quoins, mullioned windows with continuous hood moulds, and a doorway with a moulded surround. The wing is gabled, and contains casement windows.	II
Clough End Farmhouse and Cottage, Hattersley; 53.44313°N 2.02178°W	—	Late 17th century (probable)	A house and cottage with later alterations, in stone with stone-slate roofs. There are two storeys, two bays, a rear outshut, and extensions and outshuts at both ends. The doors have square-cut surrounds, the windows are mullioned, and in the rear extension are quoins. Inside there are timber framed partitions.	II
The Old Parsonage, Mottram; 53.45162°N 2.01222°W	—	Late 17th century	A stone house with a stone-slate roof, two storeys, a double-depth plan, and three bays. The central doorway has an arched head, and the windows are mullioned with hood moulds. The middle window on the upper floor has a rounded head, and the gables are partly rendered.	II
2, 4, 6, 8, and 10 Hodgefold, Broadbottom; 53.43812°N 2.02099°W		1676	Originally one house, later five cottages, the building is in stone with quoins and a stone-slate roof. It has two storeys, an L-shaped plan, five bays, outshuts, and a 20th-century extension at the rear. The doorways have square-cut surrounds, some windows are mullioned, and others are casements.	II
3 and 5 Meadow Bank, Hollingworth; 53.46742°N 1.99047°W	—	1679	Two stone cottages with quoins, stone-slate roofs, and two storeys. No. 3 has two bays, a double-depth plan, a 20th-century porch, a rear wing, and is partly rendered, and No. 5 has a 20th-century flat-roofed rear extension. Both cottages have dated lintels, that of No. 3 being dated 1698. There is a 20th-century bow window in No. 3, and the other windows are mullioned.	II
Broadbottom Hall; 53.43946°N 2.00925°W		1680	The house was extended in the 19th century and is in stone on a projecting plinth, with quoins and a stone-slate roof. It has two storeys and an L-shaped plan. In the centre is a two-storey porch with a coped gable. In the porch is a moulded surround, a dated lintel, a continuous hood mould, and a round panel in the gable. The windows are mullioned with hood moulds. Inside are timber framed partitions with wattle and daub infill.	II*
Old Post Office Farm, Mottram; 53.45701°N 2.01196°W		1694	A stone house on a plinth, with quoins and a stone-slate roof. There are two storeys, a single-depth plan, a symmetrical front of two bays, and a later rear wing. In the centre is a two-storey porch that has a doorway with a chamfered surround and an initialled and dated lintel, above which is a round-headed window, an owl hole, dove holes, and a coped gable with ball finials. The other windows are mullioned. Inside are timber framed partitions with wattle and daub infill.	II
Meadowbank Farmhouse, Hollingworth; 53.46746°N 1.99074°W	—	c. 1700	A stone farmhouse with a stone-slate roof, two storeys, a single-depth plan, two bays, and a lean-to at the right. The windows are mullioned.	II
Barn and byre, Meadowbank Farm, Hollingworth; 53.46726°N 1.99086°W	—	1700	The farm buildings were later altered and extended. They are on a projecting plinth, the earliest part is in brick, and the later parts are in stone. The roof is in stone-slate, and the buildings contain cart entries, doors, one with a dated lintel, a loft hatch with a shaped lintel, and two rows of vents.	II
Thorncliff Barn, Hollingworth; 53.46822°N 1.99810°W	—	Late 17th or early 18th century	A stone tithe barn on a plinth, with quoins and a corrugated plastic roof. There are six bays, buttresses, opposing cart entries, doors, windows, a loft hatch, and two rows of vents.	II
Thorncliff Hall, Hollingworth; 53.46667°N 1.99903°W	—	1702	The house was largely remodelled and rebuilt in about 1850 by E. H. Shellard in Jacobean style. It is in stone on a projecting plinth, and has quoins, a band, and a stone-slate roof that has gables with finials. There are two storeys, seven bays, extensions to the left and a rear wing. The central three bays project under a shaped gable flanked by two similar gables. The central door has a moulded surround, a pulvinated frieze, and a scrolled pediment containing a dated cartouche. The windows are mullioned and transomed, and there is an arched stair window at the rear.	II
Lower Roe Cross Farmhouse, Mottram; 53.46358°N 2.01979°W	—	1719	A stone farmhouse, largely rendered, with a stone-slate roof. It has two storeys, a double-depth plan, two bays, a rear wing, and a later extension to the left. The porch has a semicircular-headed opening, and most of the windows are mullioned, some with hood moulds.	II
Mottram Old Hall and Ivydene; 53.46407°N 2.01121°W		1727	The oldest part is the rear wing, it is known as Ivydene, and the major part of the house was built in about 1815. Both parts are in stone and have two storeys, the earlier part has quoins, coped gables, and mullioned windows, The later part has a hipped slate roof, a projecting plinth, a band, a modillion eaves cornice, and a pediment. There is a rusticated basement, and five bays, the central three bays projecting and pedimented. The central porch is approached by opposing flights of steps, it has Tuscan columns, and the doorway has panels and a Regency fanlight. The windows are sashes, and the middle window on the upper floor has pilasters and an entablature.	II
Gatepiers, railings, steps and walls, St Michael and All Angels Church, Mottram; 53.45410°N 2.01028°W		1734	The items date from different periods, the oldest being a coping stone on the parapet wall. There are two pairs of stone gate piers and an end pier, dated 1815, that are rusticated with bases and cornices, and one with an acorn finial. The gates are in decorated ironwork, and the steps have a right-angled flight. The coping stones on the churchyard walls are numbered and lettered to define the layout of the graves, the walls incorporate datestones, and there is one buttress.	II
Landslow Green Farmhouse; 53.47254°N 2.00500°W		Early to mid-18th century	A farmhouse, later a private house, it is in stone with a 20th-century tiled roof. There are two storeys, a double-depth plan, three bays, and a lean-to on the left. The doorway has a square-cut surround, and most of the windows are mullioned.	II
Minorca House, Hollingworth; 53.46457°N 1.98717°W	—	Early to mid-18th century	A stone house with a stone-slate roof, two storeys, a double-depth plan, three bays, and a small lean-to extension at the rear. There is a central 20th-century porch, and most of the windows are mullioned.	II
Woolley Farmhouse, Hollingworth; 53.45787°N 1.98976°W	—	1736	A stone farmhouse with a slate roof, two storeys, three bays, and a continuous rear outshut. Above the door is a dated lintel, the windows on the front are mullioned, and in the right gable they are sashes.	II
Dial House, Mottram; 53.46279°N 2.01238°W	—	1738	A stone house on a projecting plinth, with quoins, an eaves cornice, and a stone-slate roof with coped gables. There are two storeys, a double-depth plan, two bays, and a single-storey rear extension. In the left gable end is a porch that has a doorway with a moulded surround and a dated and initialled lintel, and a coped gable. On the front are two 20th-century bow windows on the ground floor and two casement windows above, and on the right side is a buttress-like feature and a mullioned and transomed stair window. Inside are timber framed partitions.	II
1 and 3 Pingot Lane, Broadbottom; 53.44839°N 2.00317°W		1742	A pair of stone cottages with a stone-slate roof. They have two storeys, a single-depth plan, five bays, and a lean-to at the left. The doorways have square-cut surrounds, and the windows are mullioned.	II
Dial Cottage, Mottram; 53.46284°N 2.01212°W	—	1742	A wing was added to the right in the 19th century, with its roof at right angles. Both parts are in stone with stone-slate roofs, two storeys, one bay each, doorways with square-cut surrounds, and mullioned windows. The original part has a projecting plinth, quoins, and an oeil-de-boeuf window.	II
Edge Lane House, Mottram; 53.46238°N 2.02051°W	—	1746	A stone house on a projecting plinth with a stone-slate roof, two storeys, a double-depth plan, and a lean-to on the right. There is a recessed porch with a semicircular head and an initialled and dated keystone, and the windows are mullioned and transomed with stone lintels.	II
4 Back Lane, Mottram; 53.45692°N 2.01191°W		18th century	A stone house, later a shop, on a plinth, with a stone-slate roof. It has two storeys, a double-depth plan, and one bay. The doorway has a square-cut surround, to the left is a shop window, and on the upper floor is a sash window.	II
49 Old Road and adjoining buildings, Mottram; 53.46531°N 2.02118°W	—	Mid-18th century	A house with a cottage to the right and a barn at the rear, in stone with roofs of slate and stone-slate. The house and cottage have a projecting plinth, shaped eaves gutter brackets, two storeys, a double-depth plan, doorways with square-cut surrounds, and mullioned windows. The house has two bays, and the cottage has one. The barn has an entry with a segmental arch, a keystone, and shaped voussoirs, and above it is a window with a skew lintel and sill.	II
Village stocks, Mottram; 53.45581°N 2.01157°W		18th century (probable)	The stocks are in the Market Place and have been moved from Hattersley. They consist of two stone posts with grooves for foot restraints and iron fasteners.	II
Crown pole, Mottram; 53.45575°N 2.01161°W		1760	There is a circular stepped stone base, the pole having been replaced in 1902 and again in 1926. The tapering pole is in cast iron, and carries light pendants, signposts, and a weathervane. On the base is an inscription.	II
1–19 Hodge Lane, Broadbottom; 53.44028°N 2.01517°W		Late 18th century	A terrace of stone houses with a stone-slate roof. They have a double depth plan, most have three storeys, the top floor being a workshop along the length of the terrace. Most cottages have one bay, doorways with square-cut surrounds, and mullioned or casement windows. No. 1 is later, it has three bays, two of which have two storeys, and the windows are sashes.	II
1 Roe Cross Farm, Mottram; 53.46551°N 2.02110°W	—	Late 18th century	A row of three stone cottages with a stone-slate roof, two storeys, a single-depth plan, and one bay each. The doorways have square-cut surrounds, and the windows are mullioned. In the left gable are two blind semicircular arched recesses.	II
Crown-Pole House, Mottram; 53.45557°N 2.01167°W	—	Late 18th century	A stone house, later incorporating a shop, on a plinth, with a slate roof. There are two storeys, two bays, the left bay having been converted into a shop, and a rear wing. In the left bay is a shop window and a door on the corner. The main doorway has a square-cut surround and a fanlight, there are mullioned windows on the front, and sash windows on the left return.	II
Manor Cottages, Hollingworth; 53.46491°N 1.98685°W	—	Late 18th century	A pair of stone houses with stone-slate roofs. Each house has two storeys and two bays, and the house on the right is lower. The windows are mullioned.	II
Stamford Cottage, Mottram; 53.46503°N 2.02078°W	—	Late 18th century	A stone house with shaped eaves gutter brackets and a stone-slate roof. There are three storeys, a double-depth plan, two bays, and a small left wing. The central doorway has a square-cut surround, and the windows on the front are mullioned. In the right gable are two mullioned and two casement windows, and the left wing has garage doors, a sash window, and a tiled roof.	II
Gun Inn, Hollingworth; 53.46105°N 1.99642°W		1781	This originated as three cottages and a public house, and was extended at the rear in the 19th and 20th centuries. The original part is in stone, the extension is in brick, and the roofs are in slate and stone-slate. The former cottages have three storeys and three bays, the original pub has two storeys and two bays, and the extension has two storeys. Both original parts have mullioned windows, and in the pub are quoins, gargoyle-like features and roundels.	II
19 and 21 Ashworth Lane, Mottram; 53.45525°N 2.01246°W	—	1790–1800	A pair of stone houses with a stone-slate roof, three storeys, a double depth plan, and one bay each. The doorways have square-cut surrounds, and the windows are mullioned.	II
Mottram Congregational Church; 53.45781°N 2.01231°W		1791	Originally a Methodist chapel, it was altered in 1836, and a wing was added to the right in 1852. It is in stone with the original part rendered, and has a slate roof. There are three bays and a rear outshut, and on the front are three round-headed windows with keystones.	II
23 Ashworth Lane, Mottram; 53.45520°N 2.01254°W	—	c. 1800	A stone house with a slate roof, three storeys, a double-depth plan, and one bay. The doorway has a square-cut surround, and the windows are mullioned, including a six-light workshop window on the top floor.	II
Ice house, Broadbottom Hall; 53.43976°N 2.00935°W	—	Late 18th or early 19th century	The ice house is in stone and covered in earth. It has a short flight of steps between low walls leading to a doorway with a semicircular arch. Beyond this are more steps within a barrel vault.	II
Stone bleaching baths, Broadbottom; 53.43831°N 2.01856°W		c. 1805–1809	These are stone baths that were used for bleaching and dyeing, and they are terraced into the hillside. The baths are in rows about a central tunnel that is covered partly in stone slabs and partly in earth. They are at least about 2 metres (6 ft 7 in) deep, and their walls are held by iron stays.	II
Sundial, Mottram; 53.45421°N 2.01022°W	—	1811	The sundial is in the churchyard of St Michael's Church. It is in stone, and consists of a circular shaft with an octagonal stepped base and an octagonal cap. On the top is a dated dial and a gnomon in copper.	II
Arrowscroft House, Hollingworth; 53.46190°N 1.99000°W	—	c. 1820	A brick house on a stone plinth, with stone dressings, a band, an eaves cornice, a blocking course, and a hipped slate roof. There are two storeys, three bays, and a small wing to the rear left. The doorway has side panels, a Regency-style elliptical fanlight, and a tetrastyle Ionic canopy. The outer bays project slightly and contain sash windows with cambered brick arches and stone sills, and the central window on the upper floor also has a moulded surround.	II
21 Church Brow, Mottram; 53.45526°N 2.01054°W	—	Early 19th century	A stone house with a 20th-century tile roof, it has two storeys, a double-depth plan, three bays, and a 20th-century extension to the right. The doorway has ¾ columns, a radial fanlight, and an open pediment, and the windows are sashes.	II
Harewood Lodge, Broadbottom; 53.44160°N 2.01383°W	—	1820s	A stone house on a projecting plinth, with a sill band, a modillion eaves cornice and blocking course, and a hipped slate roof. There are two storeys, a double-depth plan, five bays, flanking wings, and a rear wing. The central three bays project, and have a modillioned pediment, a porch with Tuscan columns, and a door with a fanlight. The windows are sashes, and the window above the door has a moulded surround and a cornice.	II
Mottram Community Centre; 53.45496°N 2.01082°W		1832	Originally a Sunday school, later a community centre, it is in stone on a projecting plinth, with bands, an embattled parapet, and a stone-slate roof with coped gables. There are two storeys with attics, six bays, and entrances in the gable ends through embattled porches. Most of the windows are mullioned with hood moulds, and in the gables are arched windows.	II
Court house, Mottram; 53.45588°N 2.01180°W		Second quarter, 19th century	A carriage house with a court house above, later used for other purposes, it is in stone on a plinth, with quoins, a sill band, an eaves cornice, and a hipped slate roof. There are two storeys, one bay on the front, and three bays on the side. On the front is a doorway with a square-cut surround, a fanlight, and a keystone. Also on the front is a drinking fountain that was installed in 1888, with a Gothic canopy, a carving, and an inscribed quotation. On the left side are two blocked former carriage entries, and the windows are sashes with round heads and keystones.	II
Widowscroft Farmhouse, Hollingworth; 53.47215°N 1.99312°W	—	1837	A farmhouse with a barn and byre all under one roof. The building is in stone and has a stone-slate roof with coped gables. The house has two storeys, a double-depth plan, three bays, and a rear wing. The central doorway has a square-cut surround and the windows are mullioned, all with hood moulds. Above the barn door is a keystone with the date and a carved stag's head, in the gable end are vents with hood moulds, and on the rear wing are ornate finials.	II
Haybarn and cartshed, Widowscroft Farm, Hollingworth; 53.47210°N 1.99279°W	—	1837	The farm buildings are in stone and have a stone-slate roof with finials on the gables. The haybarn has three bays, and another bay above the cartshed, and there is a rear outshut. The cartshed has an entry that has stone piers with shaped capitals, and chamfered lintels.	II
Broadbottom Arches Railway Viaduct; 53.44077°N 2.00739°W		1842	The viaduct was built by the Sheffield, Ashton-under-Lyne and Manchester Railway to cross the valley of the River Etherow. It is in stone with semicircular brick arches, and parts have been widened in engineering brick. There are 19 arches, one of which is skew; the skew arch has rusticated voussoirs. The parapet has a stone band and coping.	II
The Elms and wall, Mottram; 53.45874°N 2.01290°W		c. 1850	A sandstone house on a plinth, with rusticated quoins, a plain eaves frieze, a cornice, and a slate roof. There are two storeys with attics and cellars, a double-depth plan, and two bays. The door is in the left bay and has an architrave with inscribed pilasters, a rectangular fanlight, and a canopy with a triangular hood. The windows are casements. In front of the house is a stone forecourt wall with rounded tops and iron railings. It was the home of the painter L. S. Lowry.	II
Manor House, Mottram; 53.45584°N 2.01205°W	—	c. 1855	A stone house, rendered at the rear, with moulded eaves brackets, and a stone-slate roof. It has two storeys, a double-depth plan, and four bays. The doorway has ¾ Ionic columns, an enriched entablature and a fanlight, and the windows are sashes with stone sills and wedge lintels.	II
The Old School, Mottram; 53.45411°N 2.01004°W		1858	The former school is in stone on a projecting plinth, with quoins and a stone-slate roof with coped gables, and is in Jacobean style. It has a T-shaped plan, one storey and a basement. The windows are mullioned, and the two main windows also have transoms. The doorway has a Tudor arched head and a chamfered surround. In the gable is an inscribed and dated panel.	II
School House, Mottram; 53.45528°N 2.01095°W		1862	Originally the schoolmaster's house, it is in stone, and has a stone-slate roof with coped gables. There are two storeys, a single-depth plan, and three bays. The first two bays are recessed, the eaves supported by timber posts with arch bracing. The doorway has a Tudor arch with an inscription above, the windows are mullioned, and in the right bay is a plaque with a long inscription and the date.	II
The Old Mortuary, Mottram; 53.45452°N 2.01046°W	—	1895	The mortuary is in stone with quoins, a buttress, and a stone-slate roof. There are two storeys, one room on each floor, access at two levels, and the windows are mullioned.	II
War memorial, Broadbottom; 53.44113°N 2.01675°W		c. 1920	The war memorial stands at a road junction. It is in stone, and has a rusticated base with angled buttresses. From the base rise circular columns carrying a canopy with pediments, finials, and a dome surmounted by a cross. Between the columns are the names of those lost in the war. The memorial is enclosed by iron railings.	II
Hollingworth war memorial 53.46091°N 1.99687°W		1925–26	The war memorial is in stone, and consists of a Latin cross with a narrow relief outline, and has a tapering shaft with an octagonal moulded base. The cross stands on an octagonal pedestal on three octagonal steps, on a semicircular platform. The pedestal has a sloping moulded cap and a chamfered plinth. On the pedestal are inscriptions and the names of those lost in the two World Wars and in a subsequent conflict. The memorial stands in an enclosure partly surrounded by a wall and railings.	II
