= Gun Inn =

Listed pub in Hollingworth, Greater Manchester, England

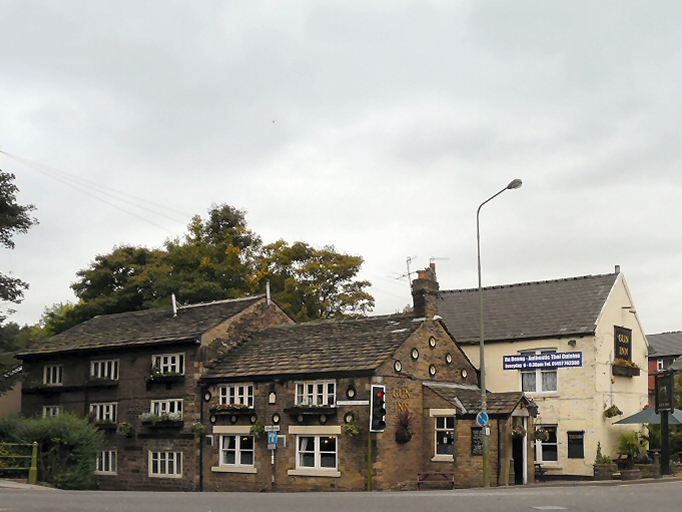
- The pub in 2008

- Location within Greater Manchester

General information
- Type: Public house
- Location: 2 Market Street, Hollingworth, Greater Manchester, England
- Coordinates: 53.4611°N 1.9963°W
- Year built: 1781; 245 years ago
- Renovated: 19th and 20th century (added); 2015 (refurbished)
- Owner: Heineken UK

Design and construction
- Designations

Listed Building – Grade II
- Official name: Gun Inn
- Designated: 1 November 1966
- Reference no.: 1068062

The Gun Inn is a Grade II listed public house on Market Street in Hollingworth, a village in Tameside, Greater Manchester, England. Built in 1781, it originally comprised three cottages and a pub, and now operates as a pub and restaurant. It was added to Tameside Council's register of assets of community value in 2016. The building stands at a busy junction where routes divide towards the A628 Woodhead Pass and the A57 Snake Pass, and its freehold was owned by Heineken UK as of 2025.

== History ==
The building was constructed in 1781, according to its official listing, with the date appearing on a datestone. It originally consisted of three cottages and a public house, which were amalgamated at an undetermined date. The 1887 Ordnance Survey map marks the building as an inn without a name, while the 1922 and 1938 editions show it as a public house. On 1 November 1966, the Gun Inn was designated a Grade II listed building.

The pub underwent refurbishment works in 2015, and as of 2025 its freehold was owned by Heineken UK. In August 2016, Tameside Council received a nomination from the Friends of Hollingworth group for the Gun Inn to be listed as an asset of community value. It was added to the register in October 2016, giving local groups the right to bid for the property if it were ever put up for sale.

The pub stands at a busy road junction in Hollingworth where routes diverge towards both the A628 Woodhead Pass and the A57 Snake Pass.

== Architecture ==
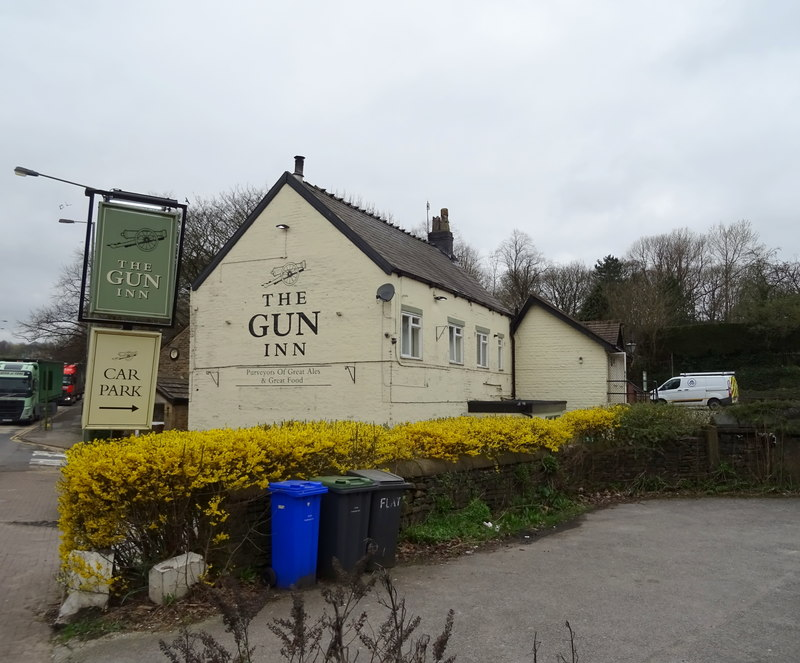
The pub in 2019, viewed looking northwest

The building is made up of earlier stonework with later brick added in the 19th century, and it has roofs of stone slates and slate. It includes three former cottages of three storeys and three bays, the original pub section with two bays over two storeys, and a two‑storey brick wing at the back.

The pub front has ground‑floor window openings from the 19th century, corner stones from the same period, two first‑floor windows with plain stone dividers, two small carved features resembling gargoyles, nine circular decorative panels, and a chimney on the gable. The right‑hand gable has six circular panels and a porch added in the 20th century.

Each of the three former cottages has its original doorway filled in, with a carved stone panel above. The first bay has a three‑part window on each floor, and the other bays have four‑part windows on each floor, all with plain stone dividers.

== See also ==
- Listed buildings in Longdendale
- Listed pubs in Greater Manchester
