= Broadbottom Viaduct =

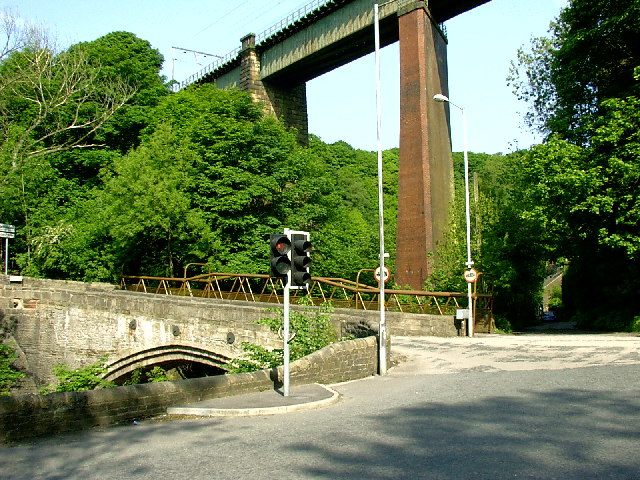
- The central section, showing one of the original stone piers and one of the 20th-century red brick intermediate piers
- Coordinates: 53.440794°N 2.006548°W
- Carries: Glossop Line
- Crosses: River Etherow
- Locale: Broadbottom, Greater Manchester, England grid reference SJ997938
- Other name(s): Etherow Arches
- Maintained by: Network Rail

Characteristics
- Total length: 169 yards (155 meters)
- Height: 136 feet (41 meters)

History
- Architect: A.S. Jee
- Designer: Joseph Locke
- Opened: 1842

Broadbottom Viaduct (also known as Etherow or Mottram Viaduct) is a railway viaduct that spans the River Etherow between Derbyshire and Greater Manchester in England. Originally of wooden construction supported by stone piers, the timber was replaced first with wrought iron box girders, less than 20 years after the viaduct's opening, later followed by steel trusses and more supporting piers.

== History and design ==
Broadbottom Viaduct is one of two similar viaducts 1.5 miles (2.4 kilometres) apart (the other being the much longer Dinting Viaduct) on the Glossop Line, which connects several villages in north-west Derbyshire with Manchester Piccadilly station. Both viaducts are significant for their height and the distance between their columns. Broadbottom is 137 feet (42 metres) high, 169 yards (155 metres) long, and has three main spans, which carry the railway over a gorge formed by the River Etherow.

Built by Joseph Locke and A. S. Jee for the Sheffield, Ashton-under-Lyne and Manchester Railway, the foundation stone of Broadbottom Viaduct was laid by John Chapman on 17 February 1842. Then on 10 December that same year trains ran from Godley to Broadbottom.

The viaduct itself was originally of a laminated timber construction with three arches (of unequal lengths) supported on piers of locally quarried stone. Each arch span had three parallel ribs, of which the middle rib was considerably heavier than the other two. The timberwork deteriorated, and was replaced with hollow wrought iron box girders which were fabricated on-site by contractors William Fairbairn & Sons while the viaduct continued in use. The girders were carried onto the bridge on bogies before being lowered onto the existing supporting piers. The work was completed by the end of 1859 after a little over six months; similar work carried out on Dinting Viaduct was completed in 1860, having had minimal effect on train services. Railway historian Gordon Biddle described the wrought iron construction as "less majestic" than the original, but "still impressive".

At some point, the wrought iron box girders were supplemented with riveted steel truss girders. Further remedial work was carried out in 1919; by then, the weight of modern trains necessitated the strengthening of Broadbottom and Dinting viaducts. Three red brick intermediate piers, of which one is in the river, were built to better support the girders.

== See also ==
- Listed buildings in Longdendale
- List of railway bridges and viaducts in the United Kingdom
