= Broadbottom Hall =

Listed building in Greater Manchester, England

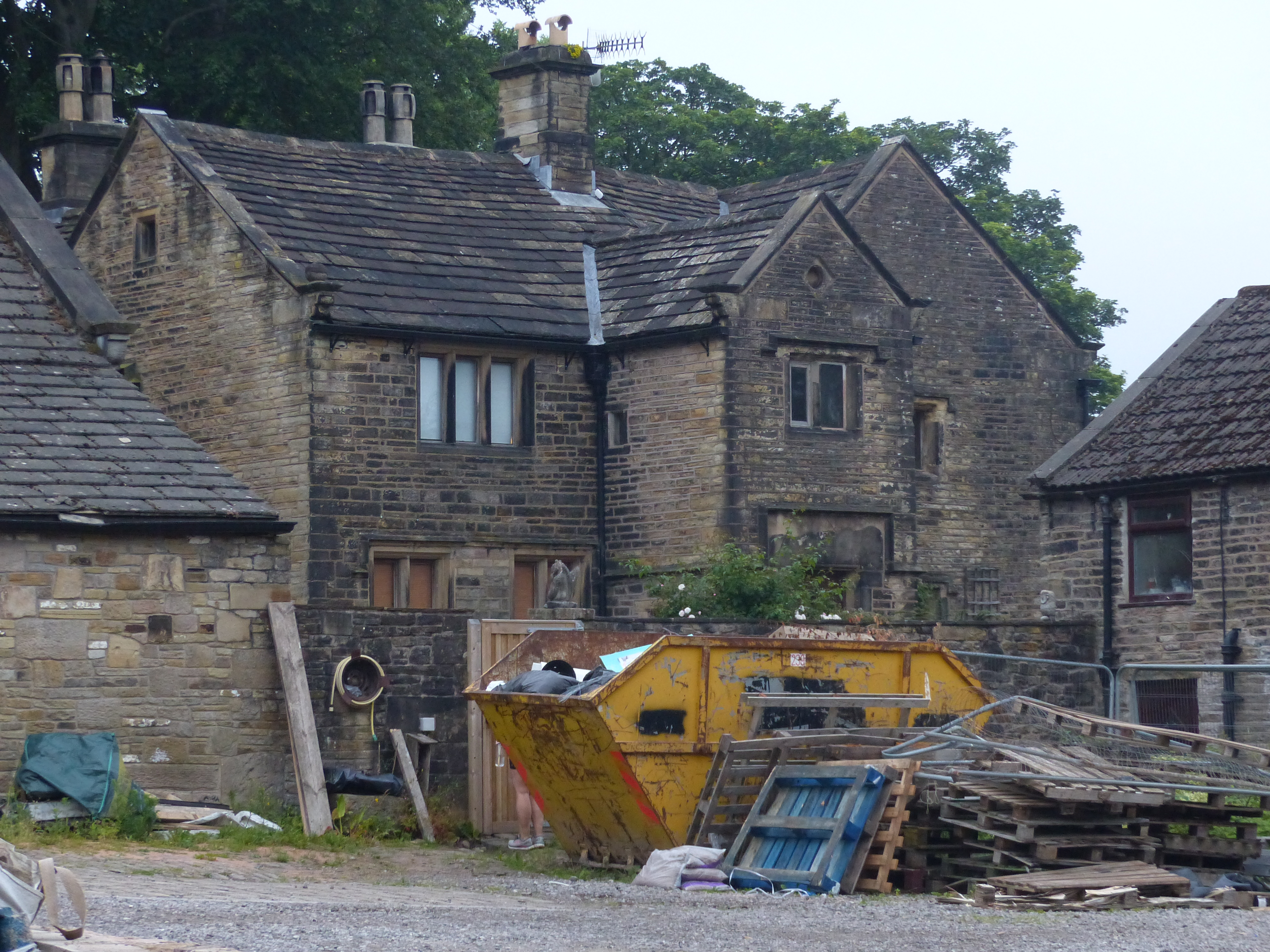
- Broadbottom Hall in 2021

- Location within Greater Manchester

General information
- Location: Bostock Road, Broadbottom, Greater Manchester, England
- Coordinates: 53.43943°N 2.00921°W
- Year built: 1680; 346 years ago
- Renovated: 19th century (extended)

Listed Building – Grade II*
- Official name: Broadbottom Hall
- Designated: 1 November 1966
- Reference no.: 1068052

Listed Building – Grade II
- Official name: Icehouse at Broadbottom Hall
- Designated: 28 January 1999
- Reference no.: 1244929

Broadbottom Hall is a Grade II* listed country house on Bostock Road in Broadbottom, a village within Tameside, Greater Manchester, England. Historically part of Cheshire, the hall dates from 1680, was extended in the 19th century, and is noted for its architectural and historic significance.

== History ==
Broadbottom Hall was constructed in 1680, as indicated by the inscription "JW1680" on the door lintel, likely referring to its original owner, J. de Wooley.

The hall was extended during the 19th century, reflecting changes in domestic architecture and the needs of its occupants. Over time, the property became part of the rural estate landscape of Longdendale, alongside other historic farmhouses and halls in the area.

On 1 November 1966, Broadbottom Hall was designated a Grade II* listed building for its architectural and historic significance.

== Architecture ==
The building is constructed of hammer-dressed stone with a graduated stone-slate roof. It has an L-shaped, two-storey plan featuring a prominent two-storey porch. The original front includes a projecting plinth and stone quoins. Windows are mainly double-chamfered mullions with hood moulds, some restored in the 19th century. The central porch has a cyma-moulded door surround, a dated lintel, and a coped gable with kneelers.

The interior retains significant historic features, including timber-framed wattle and daub partitions, chamfered and ovolo-moulded beams, a cyma-moulded stone fireplace, and a splat baluster staircase, along with many original doors.

== Associated icehouse ==
An icehouse within the grounds of Broadbottom Hall is separately listed at Grade II. Dating from the late 18th or early 19th century, it is an earth-covered structure with its entrance located on the north side. Access is provided by a short flight of stone steps flanked by low walls, leading to a boarded door set beneath a semi-circular stone arch. Beyond the entrance, a further flight of steps descends within a cross barrel vault constructed from coursed sandstone, rising from low side walls.

== See also ==
- Grade II* listed buildings in Greater Manchester
- Listed buildings in Longdendale
