= Matley =

Area of Tameside, Greater Manchester, England

Coordinates: 53.4677°N 2.0325°W

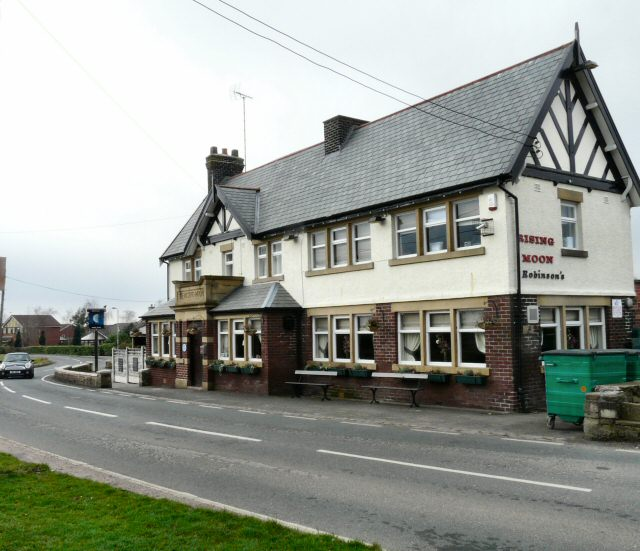
- Rising Moon pub, Matley Lane

- Location within Greater Manchester
- Metropolitan borough: Tameside
- Metropolitan county: Greater Manchester
- Region: North West
- Country: England
- Sovereign state: United Kingdom
- Post town: STALYBRIDGE
- Postcode district: SK15
- Dialling code: 0161
- Police: Greater Manchester
- Fire: Greater Manchester
- Ambulance: North West
- UK Parliament: Stalybridge and Hyde

Matley is a semi-rural area in the Tameside, Greater Manchester, England. It was formerly a civil parish in Cheshire between 1866 and 1936, when the parish was abolished and the area divided between Dukinfield, Hyde, Longdendale and Stalybridge.

== History ==
Matley was historically a township in the ancient parish of Mottram-in-Longdendale, which formed part of the Macclesfield Hundred of Cheshire. From the 17th century onwards, parishes were gradually given various civil functions under the poor laws, in addition to their original ecclesiastical functions. In some cases, including Mottram-in-Longdendale, the civil functions were exercised by each township separately rather than the parish as a whole. In 1866, the legal definition of 'parish' was changed to be the areas used for administering the poor laws, and so Matley became a civil parish.

When elected parish and district councils were created in 1894, Matley was included in the Tintwistle Rural District. The parish was too small to qualify for a parish council, and so was given a parish meeting instead. In 1936, the parish was abolished and its area split four ways, with parts going to each of the three neighbouring boroughs of Stalybridge, Dukinfield and Hyde, and part going the new Longdendale Urban District. Most of the land area of the abolished parish was split roughly evenly between Dukinfield and Hyde, but most of the population lived in the smaller area around Roe Cross that was transferred to Stalybridge. At the 1931 census (the last before the abolition of the parish), Matley had a population of 348.

Dukinfield, Hyde, Longdendale and Stalybridge all became part of the new borough of Tameside in Greater Manchester in 1974.
