= SK postcode area =

Postcode area within the United Kingdom

Stockport
- Postcode area
- Coordinates: 53.371°N 2.099°W
- Country: United Kingdom
- Postcode area: SK
- Postcode area name: Stockport
- Post towns: 11
- Postcode districts: 19
- Postcode sectors: 113
- Postcodes (live): 16,414
- Postcodes (total): 24,976
- Statistics as at May 2020

The SK postcode area, also known as the Stockport postcode area, is a group of nineteen postcode districts in England, within eleven post towns. These cover south-east Greater Manchester (including Stockport, Cheadle, Hyde, Stalybridge and Dukinfield), parts of east Cheshire (including Macclesfield, Wilmslow and Alderley Edge), north-west Derbyshire (including Buxton, High Peak and Glossop) and a small part of north Staffordshire.

Mail for the SK postcode area is processed at Manchester Mail Centre, along with mail for the M, BL and OL postcode areas.

== Coverage ==
The approximate coverage of the postcode districts:

Postcode district	Post town	Coverage	Local authority area(s)
SK1	STOCKPORT	Stockport	Stockport
SK2	STOCKPORT	Stockport, Offerton	Stockport
SK3	STOCKPORT	Stockport, Davenport, Edgeley, Adswood, Bridgehall	Stockport
SK4	STOCKPORT	Stockport, Four Heatons	Stockport
SK5	STOCKPORT	Stockport, Brinnington, Reddish	Stockport
SK6	STOCKPORT	Bredbury, Romiley, Woodley, Marple, Marple Bridge, High Lane	Stockport
SK7	STOCKPORT	Bramhall, Hazel Grove, Woodford	Stockport
SK8	CHEADLE	Cheadle, Cheadle Hulme, Gatley, Heald Green	Stockport
SK9	WILMSLOW	Wilmslow, Handforth, Styal	Cheshire East
SK9	ALDERLEY EDGE	Alderley Edge	Cheshire East
SK10	MACCLESFIELD	Macclesfield (north), Bollington, Pott Shrigley, Prestbury, Rainow	Cheshire East
SK11	MACCLESFIELD	Macclesfield (south), Sutton, Rushton Spencer	Cheshire East, Staffordshire Moorlands
SK12	STOCKPORT	Disley, Poynton	Cheshire East
SK13	GLOSSOP	Glossop, Hadfield	High Peak
SK14	HYDE	Hyde, Broadbottom, Gee Cross, Hollingworth, Mottram in Longdendale	Tameside
SK15	STALYBRIDGE	Stalybridge, Carrbrook, Heyrod, Matley, Millbrook	Tameside
SK16	DUKINFIELD	Dukinfield	Tameside
SK17	BUXTON	Buxton, Tideswell, Hartington, Longnor, Chelmorton	High Peak, Derbyshire Dales, Staffordshire Moorlands
SK22	HIGH PEAK	Birch Vale, Hayfield, Little Hayfield, New Mills, Rowarth	High Peak
SK23	HIGH PEAK	Buxworth, Chapel-en-le-Frith, Chinley, Combs, Furness Vale, Kettleshulme, Whaley Bridge	Cheshire East, High Peak

The SK22 and SK23 districts and the HIGH PEAK post town were formed in 1996, out of the SK12 district and the STOCKPORT post town.

== Map ==
SK postcode area map, showing postcode districts in red and post towns in grey text, with links to nearby CW, DE, HD, M, OL, S, ST and WA postcode areas.

== See also ==
- Postcode Address File (PAF)
- List of postcode areas in the United Kingdom
