= Longdendale Urban District =

Former local government area in the UK

Coordinates: 53°27′38″N 1°59′51″W

Longdendale
- Urban District
- Longdendale UD within Cheshire in 1970
- Area
  - 1971: 1,435 hectares (3,550 acres)
- Population
  - 1939: 4,955
  - 1971: 10,359
- History
  - Created: 1 April 1936
  - Abolished: 31 March 1974
  - Succeeded by: Tameside
- Status: Urban district
  - HQ: Hollingworth

Longdendale Urban District was an urban district in Cheshire, England. It was created in 1936 and abolished in 1974. It was named after Longdendale, and covered western parts of the valley. The council was based in Hollingworth and the district also included Mottram in Longdendale, Broadbottom and surrounding areas. On the district's abolition in 1974, the area became part of the metropolitan borough of Tameside in Greater Manchester.

== History ==
The district was created in 1936. It covered the combined area of the two former urban districts of Mottram in Longdendale and Hollingworth, plus smaller areas transferred from the neighbouring parishes of Hattersley and Matley, which were abolished at the same time. The new district was named Longdendale, although it only covered the western end of the valley. (Note: The name was officially spelled 'Longdendale', as given in the Registrar General's official report noting the district's creation, on Ordnance Survey maps, by the council itself, and in the Local Government Act 1972 which abolished the district. The variant spelling of 'Longendale' was occasionally used by others while the district existed, and the Longendale spelling was subsequently used in Frederic Youngs' Guide to the Local Administrative Units of England (1991). The Longendale version of the spelling has been adopted as the primary name by the Great Britain Historical GIS project (which runs the Vision of Britain through Time website), based on Youngs.)

The council was based at Albion Lodge (now called Albion House) on the street called Mottram Moor in Hollingworth, which had been the old Hollingworth Urban District Council's headquarters since 1913.

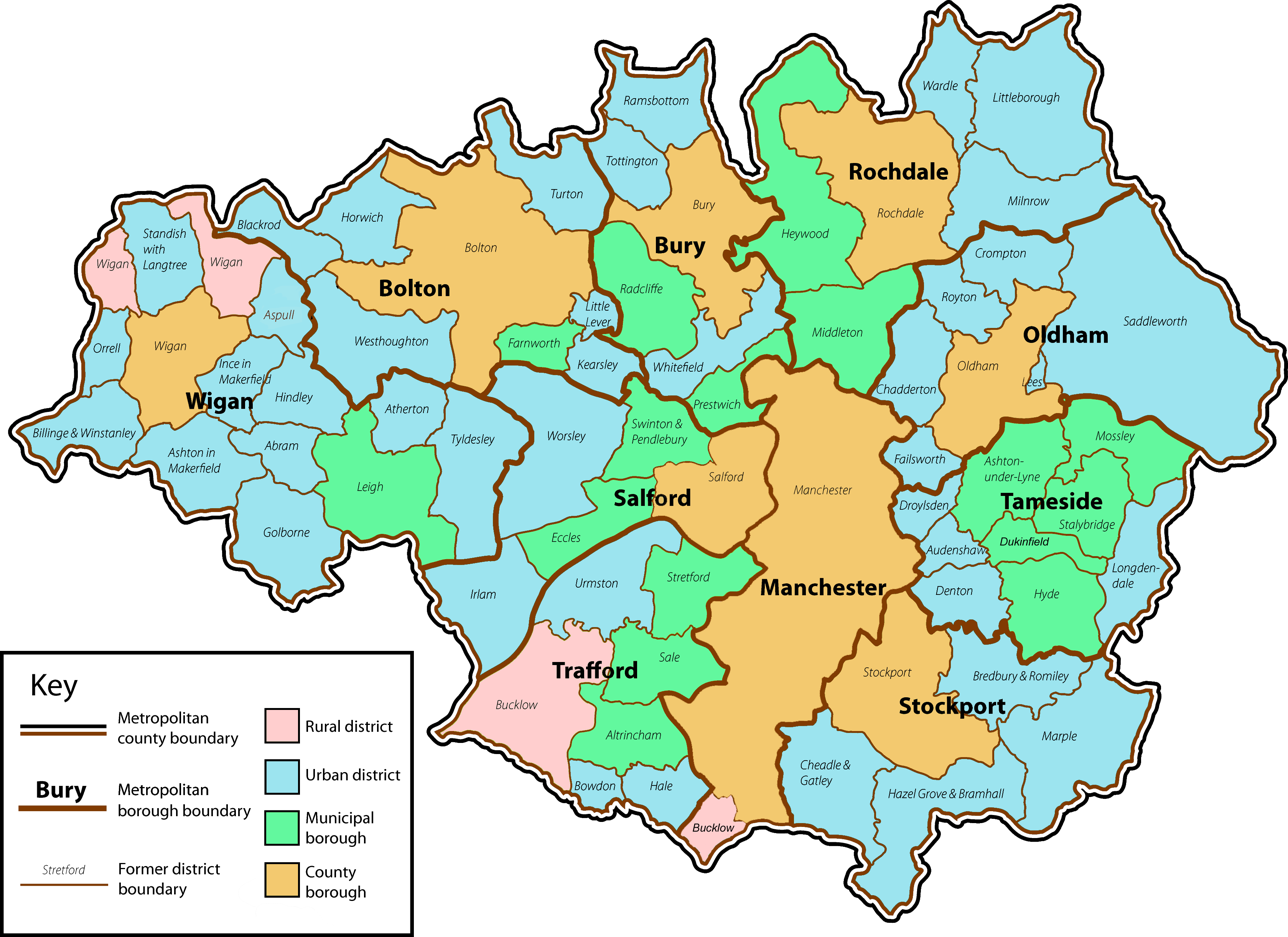
Longdendale Urban District is in the bottom right of this map of modern-day Greater Manchester, superimposed over former district boundaries.

Longdendale Urban District was abolished in 1974 under the Local Government Act 1972. The area became part of the Metropolitan Borough of Tameside in Greater Manchester.

== See also ==
- Longdendale Bypass
