= Laurence Earnshaw =

English mechanic and inventor

Laurence Earnshaw (died 1767), was an 18th-century English mechanic and inventor. A monument was raised to Earnshaw's memory in 1868 in Mottram cemetery, until which his works remained largely unrecognised.

== Early life ==
Earnshaw was born in the early eighteenth century at Wednescough, in the parish of Mottram-in-Longdendale, Cheshire, England. Earnshaw's father was a weaver. After serving a seven-year apprenticeship to his father's business, Earnshaw was apprenticed to a tailor for four years, and then again to a clockmaker in Stockport. Earnshaw had developed interests in diverse fields like musical instrument-making, sundial-making, bellfounding, gilding, engraving, painting, metal works, optical instruments, mathematics, chemistry and metallurgy,.

== Inventions ==
In 1753, Earnshaw is said to have invented a machine that could spin and reel cotton in a single operation, which he exhibited to some neighbours and then destroyed, fearing that its use might deprive the poor of the benefit of their labour, though the report is not generally considered true. Earnshaw also invented a machine to raise water from a coal mine at Hague, near Mottram. Earnshaw's greatest work is considered to be the making of an astronomical clock, which took him several years to complete. He made many of these clocks. One of such clocks was sold to John Stuart, 3rd Earl of Bute, for £150, and it later became the property of Lord Lonsdale.

== Personal life ==
Earnshaw's earnings were only small despite his great local fame as a mechanic, and he remained poor to the end. His wife was bedridden for many years, and his privations were increased in the latter period of his life by his own lameness.
Earnshaw was a good friend of the better known English engineer James Brindley, and when the two met, they used to spend hours discussing matters of science and engineering. Earnshaw died in May 1767, at the age of about 60, and was buried at Mottram.

== Recognition ==
About a hundred years after Earnshaw died, a monument was raised to his memory by public subscription in Mottram cemetery as a result of a series of articles written in the Ashton Reporter by William Chadwick. The monument's inauguration was marked by a public procession on 10 April 1868.
