= Cross, Mottram in Longdendale =

Listed structure in Greater Manchester, England

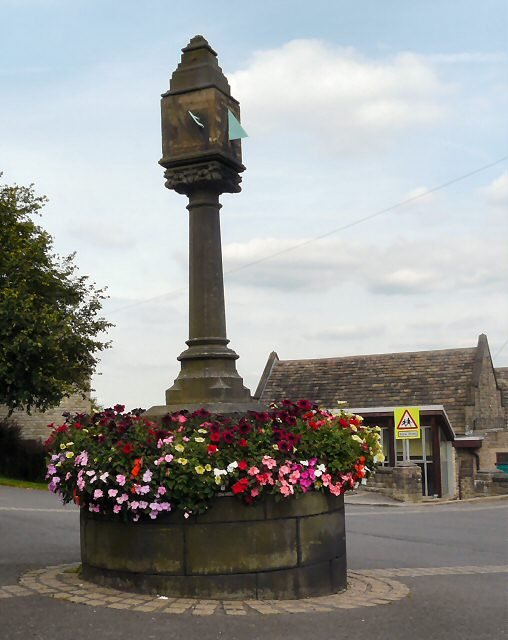
- The cross in 2009

- Location within Greater Manchester

General information
- Location: Warhill, Mottram in Longdendale, Greater Manchester, England
- Coordinates: 53.45386°N 2.01047°W
- Year built: Medieval
- Renovated: 1760 and 1897 (restored)

Technical details
- Material: Ashlar

Listed Building – Grade II*
- Official name: Cross
- Designated: 6 February 1986
- Reference no.: 1068028

The Cross, Mottram in Longdendale is a Grade II* listed structure on Warhill, near St Michael and All Angels Church, in the village of Mottram in Longdendale within Tameside, Greater Manchester, England. Believed to be of medieval origin and long associated with religious and communal gatherings in the ancient parish, it was described in 1795 by John Aikin as an "ancient cross" standing beside the churchyard. The structure has undergone two major restorations, in 1760 and in 1897, the latter forming part of local commemorations for Queen Victoria's Diamond Jubilee.

== History ==
The cross is believed to be of medieval origin, serving as a focal point for religious and communal gatherings in the ancient parish of Mottram. Documentary evidence suggests that an "ancient cross" stood adjacent to the churchyard as early as the 18th century, noted by John Aikin in his 1795 description of the village.

About fifty years ago, the houses were few in number, and principally situated on top of the hill, adjoining the churchyard, where is an ancient cross, and at a small distance the parsonage house, now gone much to decay and occupied by working people.

— John Aikin, A Description of the Country from thirty to forty miles round Manchester (1795)

The structure has undergone two phases of restoration during its history. The first took place in 1760, when work was carried out on the original stonework and the surviving remains of the medieval cross. The second occurred in 1897 to mark the Diamond Jubilee of Queen Victoria. The work included repairs and alterations to the structure and formed part of the local commemorations of the Jubilee.

On 6 February 1986, the cross was designated a Grade II* listed building for its architectural and historic significance.

== Description ==
The cross stands on a stepped circular ashlar plinth, which bears the inscription: "Restored in commemoration of the sixtieth year of the reign of Queen Victoria 1897". Rising from the base is a tapering octagonal shaft set on a moulded base and crowned with a foliated capital. At the summit of the shaft is a cubical sundial with three copper faces. The front face carries the Latin motto "hora pars vitae" ("an hour is part of life"), while the rear face bears the inscription: "and watch and pray time hastes away when time is done eternity comes on".

== Location and setting ==
The cross stands on Warhill, adjacent to the Grade II*-listed St Michael and All Angels Church, dating from the late 15th century. The elevated position overlooks the Longdendale valley, which historically formed an important packhorse route between Cheshire and Yorkshire.

== See also ==
- Grade II* listed buildings in Greater Manchester
- Listed buildings in Longdendale
