= Hollingworth =

Village in Greater Manchester, England

Coordinates: 53.463°N 1.991°W

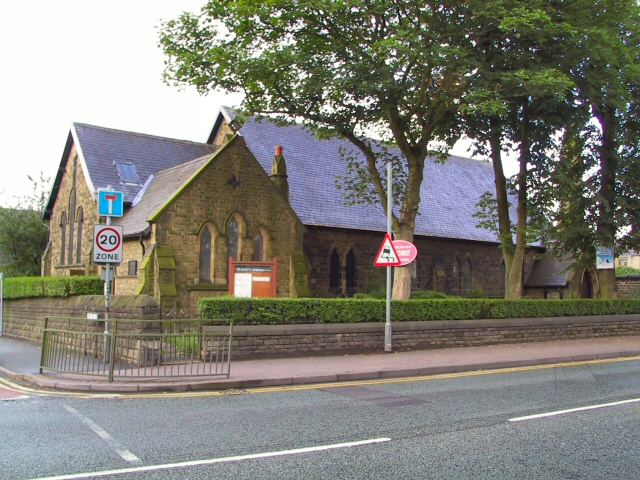
- St Mary's Church, Hollingworth

- Location within Greater Manchester
- OS grid reference: SK006962
- Metropolitan borough: Tameside
- Metropolitan county: Greater Manchester
- Region: North West
- Country: England
- Sovereign state: United Kingdom
- Post town: HYDE
- Postcode district: SK14
- Dialling code: 01457
- Police: Greater Manchester
- Fire: Greater Manchester
- Ambulance: North West
- UK Parliament: Stalybridge and Hyde

Hollingworth is a village in the Tameside district, in Greater Manchester, England. It is about 11 miles (19 km) east of Manchester, on the Derbyshire border near Hadfield. It lies within the historic county boundaries of Cheshire, and became part of Greater Manchester in 1974. It gave its name to a family who owned much of the surrounding area from before the time of the Norman conquest.

== Toponymy ==
Hollingworth was recorded Holisvrde before 1059 and in 1086. Its name is derived from the Old English holegn, for holly and worð an enclosure. In 1059, Hollingworth was surrounded by dense forests.

== History ==
=== Early history ===
An ancient pagan religious site known as Wedneshough Green was in Hollingworth. A grassy knoll opposite the Gun Inn was anciently called Wedenshaw or Woden's Hawe after the pagan god Woden. The region was populated by Celts, the Pecsaetans a southern branch of the Brigantes. The group became a distinct ethnic tribe in the Mercian Kingdom of the West Angles. The tribes living in the Longdendale valley were pagans until around 627AD when the surrounding districts started converting to Christianity.

Hollingworth was in the ancient Hundred of Hamestan before 1000 AD which is believed to be the ancient boundaries of the Pecsaetan tribesmen. After the Norman conquest in 1086, the Hundred of Hamestan was redefined and renamed the Macclesfield Hundred.

=== Manor ===
Hollingworth was an ancient manor governed by a local lord. Members of a single family, the Hollingworths, were lords of the manor for more than 700 years. In this part of Cheshire, local lords assumed the name of their manor as their surname. Some were granted arms by the Earl of Chester. The family's ancient arms are three holly leaves.

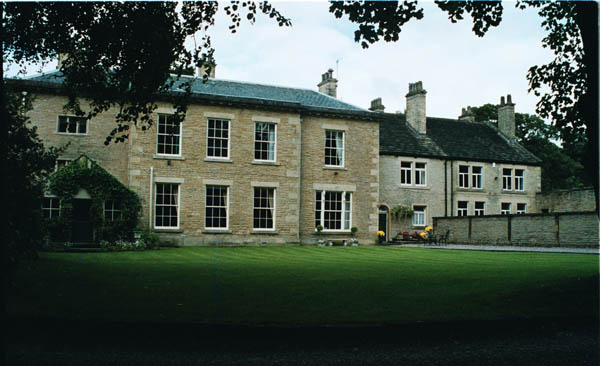
Original facade of Old Mottram Hall

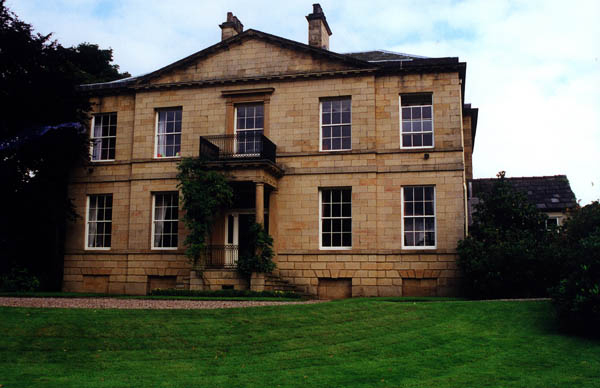
Facade to Old Mottram Hall as renovated by the Hadfield family

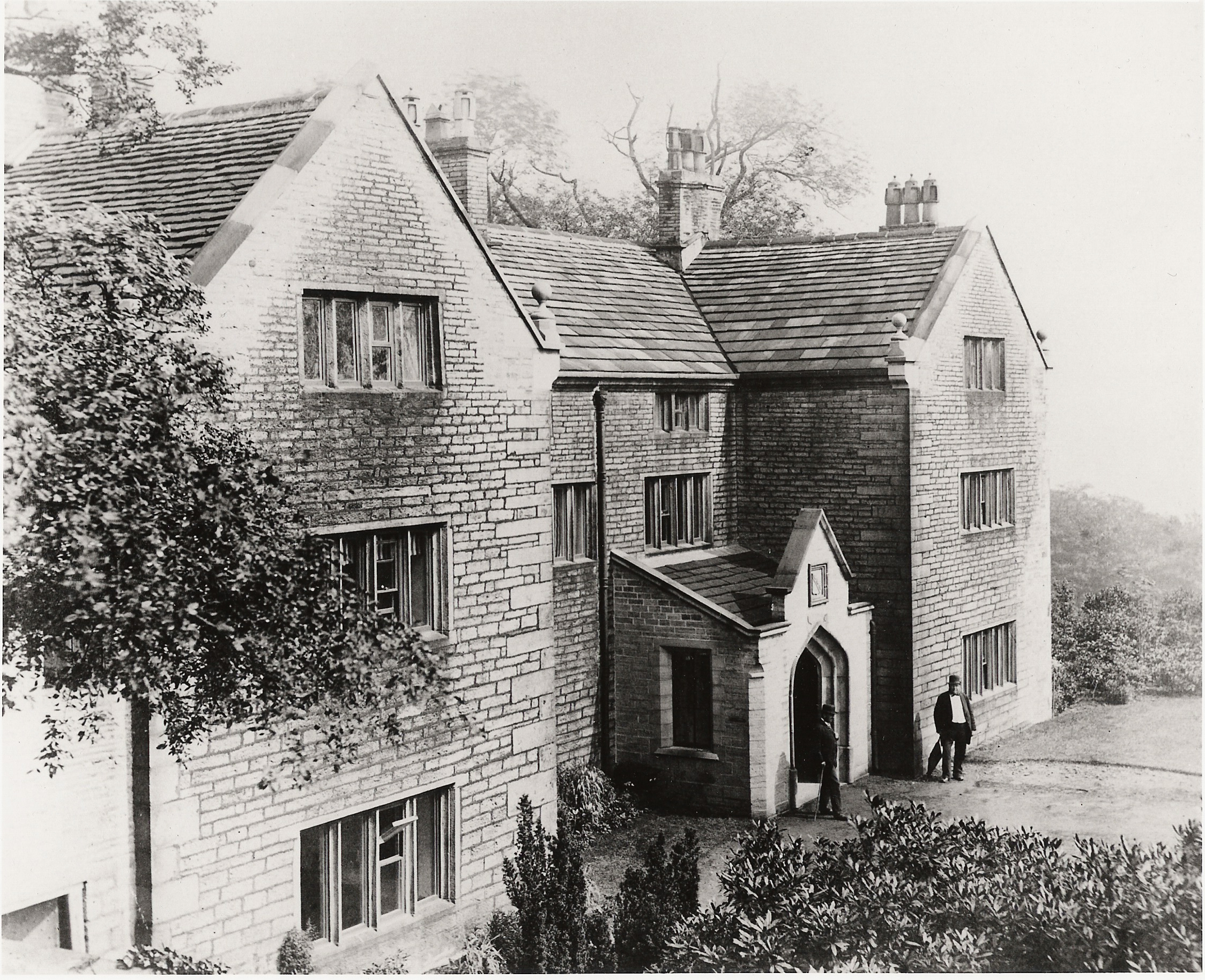
Hollingworth Hall

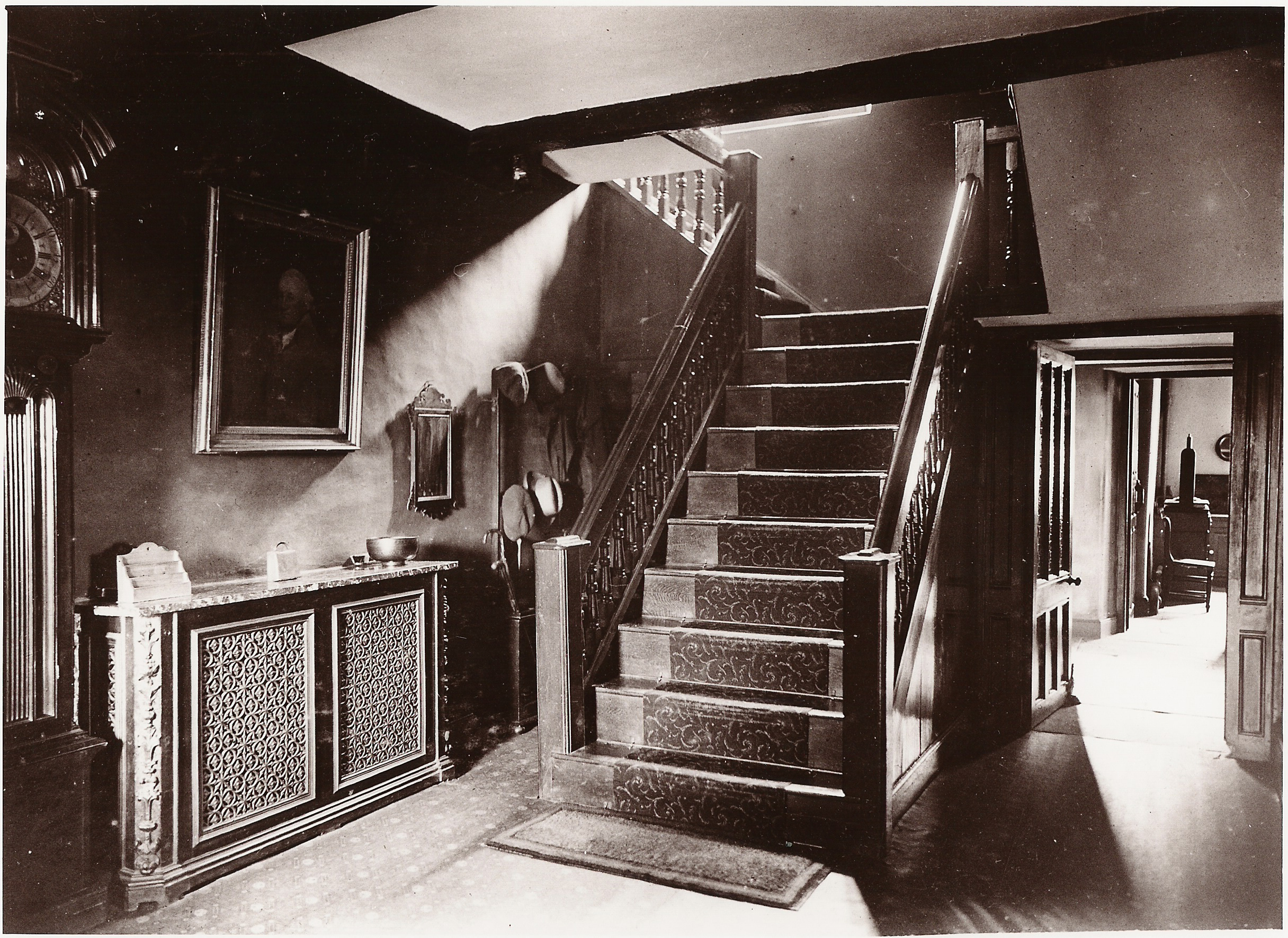
Inside Hollingworth Hall

In 1059 when the Saxons ruled Cheshire, Hollingworth was held by a freeman who owed his rights to his senior lord; Edwin the Earl of Chester. Edwin was the chief lord of all the manors in the Hamestan Hundred. He leased the manor of Hollingworth to a freeman and his descendants for an annual rent and military service. In 1059, Hollingworth had 30 acres of productive farmland. The Saxon freeman in possession of the manor was removed sometime before 1086 by the Normans.

After the Norman conquest of England, Earl Edwin's lands were forfeited. The Domesday Book in 1086 shows that Hollingworth manor was barren and worthless. Paul Howson and William Booth wrote that 'No population is recorded for the area covered by the later forest of Macclesfield or the Lordship of Longdendale ...'. The Lordship of Longdendale was a term that came into common use around 1359, to describe a parcel of manors which includes Hollingworth. The wholesale ejectment of the Saxons from manors in Longdendale appears to have specific to those lands under the control of Hugh Lupus, Earl of Chester. He replaced the Saxon freeman on the Cheshire side of Longdendale with Normans and Saxon farmers under the control of a local Saxon chieftain called Wulfric (pronounced Uluric). On the Derbyshire side of Longdendale, which was controlled by the king, many ancient Saxon families remained in control of their lands.

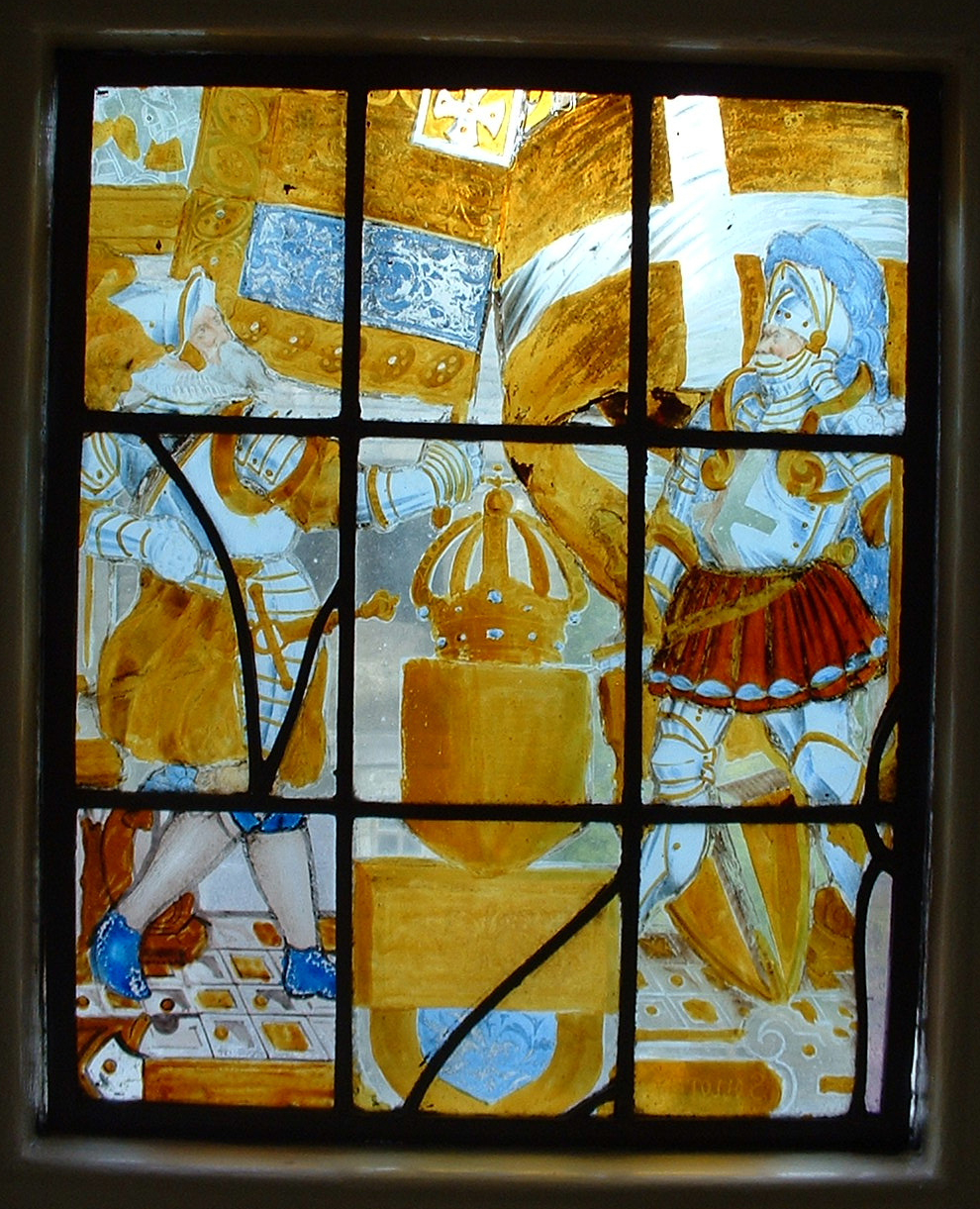
A window originally from Hollingworth Hall

The Domesday Book shows that Hollingworth was held by the Earl of Chester with no local lord in control of the manor. The Saxon chieftain Wulfric managed manors in Longdendale on behalf of the Earl of Chester. Heavily wooded and dangerous because of wolves in the forests, Hollingworth and the manors of Mottram, Matley, Tintwistle and Stayley appear to have been wilderness until 1211. By 1140 local farmers assumed the name of their manor as their surname. Sometime before 1211, Sir William De Neville (De NovaVilla), took up residence at Bucton Castle in Tintwistle, and was installed as over-lord to manage the local lords in possession of Hollingworth, Wolley, Broadbottom, Hattersley, Wernet, Matley, Stayley, Mottram-in-Longdendale and Tintwistle.

In 1211, William De Neville gave his son-in-law, Thomas de Burgh or Burgo, control of all the manors in Longdendale as the supreme over-lord. Around 1222, Thomas de Burgh took the neighbouring manor of Godley from Albinus and gave it to Adam, son of Reginald de Bredbury. Witness to this deed was a 'Tomas de Holinwurthe'.

The earliest recorded Hollingworths are Tomas de Holinwurthe circa 1222, 1246; and Henry de Holenwart in 1222. The ancient manor of Hollingworth including the minor manors of Thorncliffe and Wolley was held by the de Holynworths of Hollingworth Hall by 'knight's service'. By 1359, the manor was owned by different scions of the Hollingworth family. Greater Hollingworth was owned by the senior branch living at Hollingworth Hall. Little Hollingworth was inherited by a younger brother who lived at Old Mottram Hall; he married the heiress to Matley Hall. A younger sister held a share of Thorncliffe Manor, also called Little Hollingworth manor, and was at Thorncliffe Hall in 1359.

The ancient family of Hollingworth migrated to Devon, London, Lincoln, Maidstone in Kent and Dale Abbey in Derbyshire. A pedigree for the family shows they descended in a continuous male line from the Lords of Hollingworth to the present day.

Hollingworth Hall is no longer standing, but the family's chapel remains.

== Governance ==
There is one main tier of local government covering Hollingworth, at metropolitan borough level: Tameside Metropolitan Borough Council. The council is a member of the Greater Manchester Combined Authority, which is led by the directly-elected Mayor of Greater Manchester. Hollingworth forms part of the Longdendale ward of Tameside.

=== Administrative history ===
Hollingworth was historically a township in the ancient parish of Mottram-in-Longdendale, which formed part of the Macclesfield Hundred of Cheshire. From the 17th century onwards, parishes were gradually given various civil functions under the poor laws, in addition to their original ecclesiastical functions. In some cases, including Mottram-in-Longdendale, the civil functions were exercised by each township separately rather than the parish as a whole. In 1866, the legal definition of 'parish' was changed to be the areas used for administering the poor laws, and so Hollingworth became a civil parish.

The Hollingworth township was made a local government district in 1863, administered by an elected local board. Such districts were reconstituted as urban districts under the Local Government Act 1894. In 1913, the council moved its headquarters to Albion Lodge (now called Albion House) on the street called Mottram Moor.

Hollingworth Urban District was abolished in 1936 to become part of the new Longdendale Urban District. In 1931 (the last census before the abolition of the parish and urban district), Hollingworth had a population of 2,299. Longdendale Urban District was in turn abolished in 1974 under the Local Government Act 1972. The area became part of the Metropolitan Borough of Tameside in Greater Manchester.

== Geography ==
Hollingworth lies in the valley of Longdendale, on the north bank of the River Etherow, which forms the county boundary with Derbyshire. Hollingworth is classed as part of the built-up area of Hadfield, on the south bank of the Etherow, by the Office for National Statistics.

== Transport ==
The village is served by the A628 road (leading to the Woodhead pass to Barnsley) and the A57 road (leading to the Snake Pass to Sheffield). Going west, the A57 joins the M67 motorway a couple of miles from the village.

Hollingworth is also served by Metroline Service 237 from Glossop to Ashton-under-Lyne, passing every 30 minutes until 6pm then every hour thereafter.

== Education ==
There are two schools in Hollingworth:

- Hollingworth Primary and Nursery School, for children up to aged 11
- Longdendale High School, a comprehensive school for children aged 11–16.

== Culture and community ==
- Hollingworth Cricket Club plays in the Derbyshire and Cheshire League.
- Hollingworth Brass Band rehearses at Longdendale Community Language College.
- Etherow Bowling Club is located just off the Boulevard at the bottom of Taylor Street. They have 6 teams (5 Men's & 1 Ladies') who play Crown Green Bowls.
- 1st Longdendale Scouts troop night is held at the Cannon Street Community Centre weekly.

== Notable people ==
- Fashion designer Vivienne Westwood (1941–2022) was born at 6, Millbrook in the village.
