= Mottram in Longdendale =

Village in Greater Manchester, England

Coordinates: 53.457°N 2.011°W

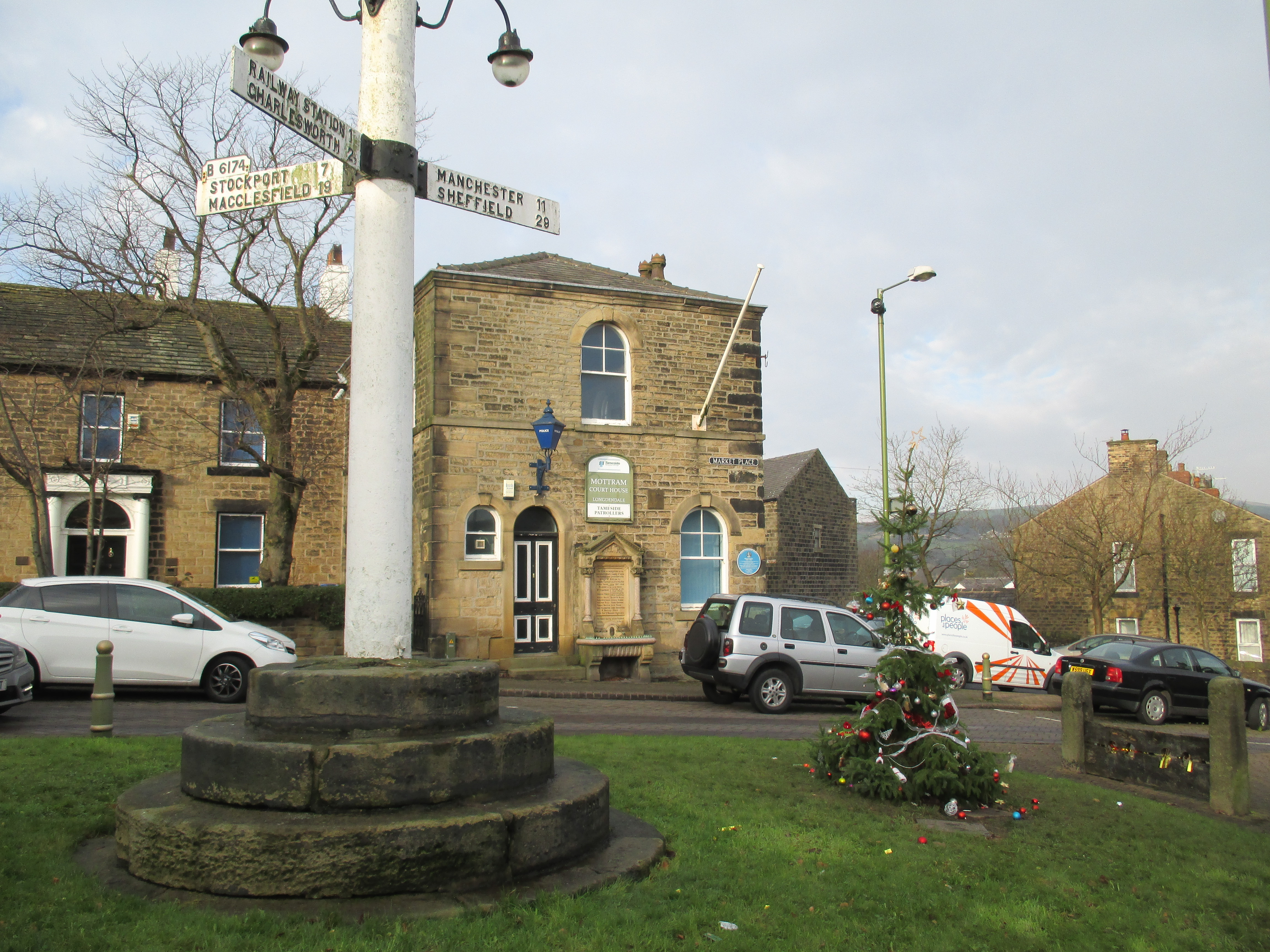
- Market Place, Mottram

- Location within Greater Manchester
- OS grid reference: SJ992956
- Metropolitan borough: Tameside
- Metropolitan county: Greater Manchester
- Region: North West
- Country: England
- Sovereign state: United Kingdom
- Post town: HYDE
- Postcode district: SK14
- Dialling code: 01457
- Police: Greater Manchester
- Fire: Greater Manchester
- Ambulance: North West
- UK Parliament: Stalybridge and Hyde

Mottram in Longdendale is a village in Tameside, Greater Manchester, England, 1 mile (1.6 km) west of Hadfield and 3 miles (4.8 km) east of Hyde. Within the historic county of Cheshire, it became part of Greater Manchester in 1974. Mottram in Longdendale was an ancient parish which covered an extensive area of north-east Cheshire until it was split into smaller parishes in the 19th century. It lies in Longdendale, the valley of the River Etherow, and is close to the border with Derbyshire.

== History ==
In 1795, John Aikin described Mottram as follows:

Mottram is situated twelve miles from Manchester and seven from Stockport, on a high eminence one mile to the west of the Mersey, from which river the ground begins to rise; half the way being so steep as to make it difficult of access. It forms a long street well paved both in the town and to some distance on the roads. It contains 127 houses, which are for the most part built of a thick flag stone, and covered with a thick, heavy slate, of nearly the same quality, no other covering being able to endure the strong blasts of wind which occasionally occur. Of late, many of the houses in the skirts of the town are built with brick. About fifty years ago, the houses were few in number, and principally situated on top of the hill, adjoining the churchyard, where is an ancient cross, and at a small distance the parsonage house, now gone much to decay and occupied by working people. It is only of late years that the town has had any considerable increase, which has been chiefly at the bottom of the hill, but some latterly on the top...

— John Aikin, A Description of the Country from thirty to forty miles round Manchester (1795)

In the 18th century the River Etherow was known as the Mersey. The River Tame has been a border from the earliest times between the Anglo-Saxon kingdoms of Northumbria and Mercia. The ancient parish was the most northerly in Cheshire.

Mottram came to prominence as a transport hub. It lies on two pack horse routes used to carry salt from Cheshire to South Yorkshire over the Pennines and carry lime for soil improvement from Chapel-en-le-Frith. It was on the stagecoach route between Manchester and Sheffield. Before the Industrial Revolution, Mottram and Ashton-under-Lyne had been the most significant towns in the area. The manor and manorial court house were in Mottram, but other towns eclipsed Mottram in size and importance. Mottram was active in the early stages of industrialisation, and there were significant cotton spinning mills in Wedneshough Green and the Treacle Street areas of Mottram Moor, and printing and dyeing works on the Etherow at Broadbottom which until recently was part of the parish.

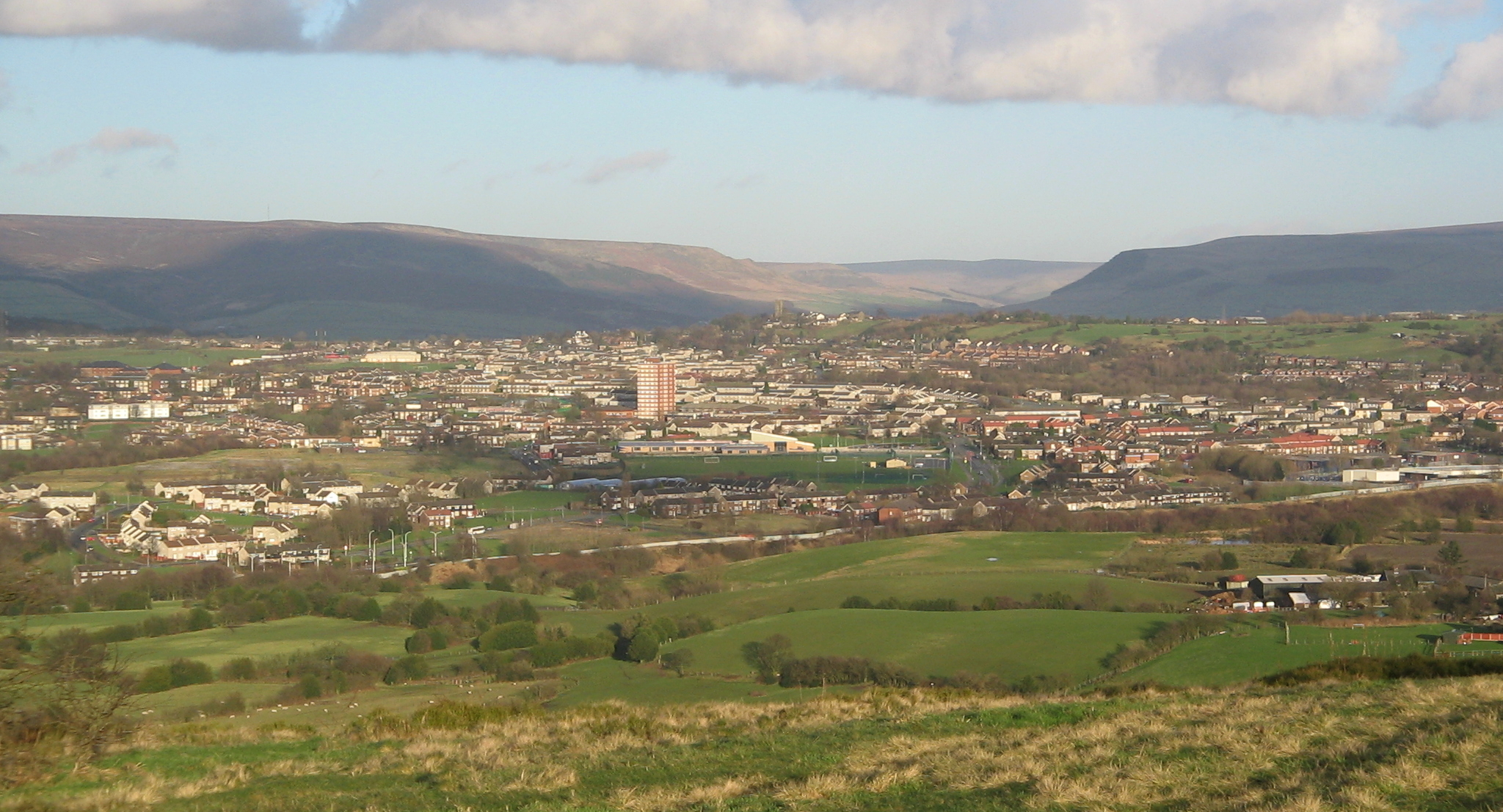
Hattersley and Mottram in Longdendale from Werneth Low

The smaller early mills in Mottram became uneconomic and harder to run. Stalling industrialisation led to social conflict and hunger during 1812 Luddite riots that led to the smashing of labour-reducing machines. The Luddites secretly drilled on Wedneshough Green. In 1842 local Chartists met on the green, and planned the closure of Stalybridge factories in the Plug Riots. By 1860 the population had peaked.

The Sheffield, Ashton-under-Lyne and Manchester Railway was built in the early 1840s, passing along Longdendale. Broadbottom railway station opened in 1842; it was in the township of Mottram, but at the foot of the hill, a mile south of the village centre. The station was called 'Mottram' between 1845 and 1884, then 'Mottram and Broadbottom' between 1884 and 1954, after which it reverted to just 'Broadbottom'.

A Polish pilot, Josef Gawkowski, was killed on 19 July 1942 when his aircraft crashed near Mottram on a training flight from RAF Newton in Nottinghamshire. A memorial plaque commemorating him is in Mottram Cemetery.

== Governance ==
There is one main tier of local government covering Mottram, at metropolitan borough level: Tameside Metropolitan Borough Council. The council is a member of the Greater Manchester Combined Authority, which is led by the directly-elected Mayor of Greater Manchester. Mottram forms part of the Longdendale ward of Tameside.

=== Administrative history ===
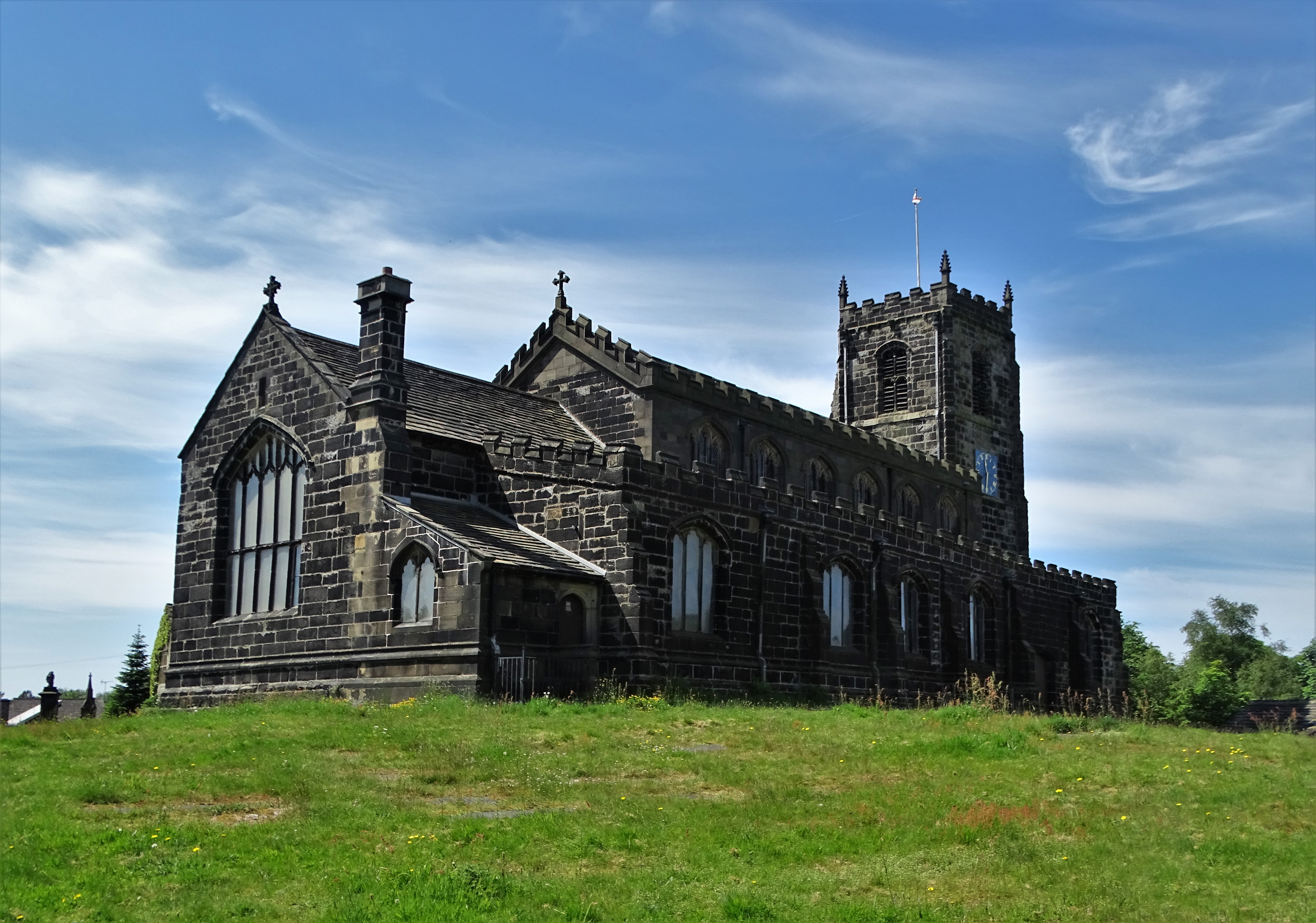
St Michael and All Angels Church at the centre of the parish

Mottram in Longdendale was an ancient parish within the Macclesfield Hundred of Cheshire. The parish was subdivided into eight townships: Godley, Hattersley, Hollingworth, Matley, Newton, Stayley, Tintwistle, and a Mottram township which covered the area around the village itself and Broadbottom to the south. From the 17th century onwards, parishes were gradually given various civil functions under the poor laws, in addition to their original ecclesiastical functions. In some cases, including Mottram in Longdendale, the civil functions were exercised by each township separately rather than the parish as a whole. In 1866, the legal definition of 'parish' was changed to be the areas used for administering the poor laws, and so the townships also became separate civil parishes.

A Mottram in Longdendale local government district was established in 1873, just covering the Mottram township, administered by an elected local board. Such districts were converted into urban districts under the Local Government Act 1894.

Mottram in Longdendale Urban District was abolished in 1936 to become part of the new Longdendale Urban District. In 1931 (the last census before the abolition of the urban district), Mottram in Longdendale had a population of 2,636. Longdendale Urban District was in turn abolished in 1974 under the Local Government Act 1972. The area became part of the Metropolitan Borough of Tameside in Greater Manchester.

== Geography ==
Geology of the wider area

Mottram occupies an elevated site straddling the A57 trunk road from the end of the M67 to the junction with the A628 trunk road. It is 10 miles (16 km) east of Manchester, on land between 150m to 250m above mean sea level. The geology is mainly boulder clay above millstone grit, but there are small outcrops of coal at the edge of the Lancashire Coalfield. To the south and east of Mottram is the River Etherow and to the west is the Hurstclough Brook.

Mottram is classed as part of the built-up area of Hadfield (the main part of which is in Derbyshire) by the Office for National Statistics. The Ordnance Survey labels the village 'Mottram in Longdendale' on its maps, but the Royal Mail uses the shorter form 'Mottram' for the postal locality, which is part of the Hyde post town.

=== Longdendale bypass proposal ===
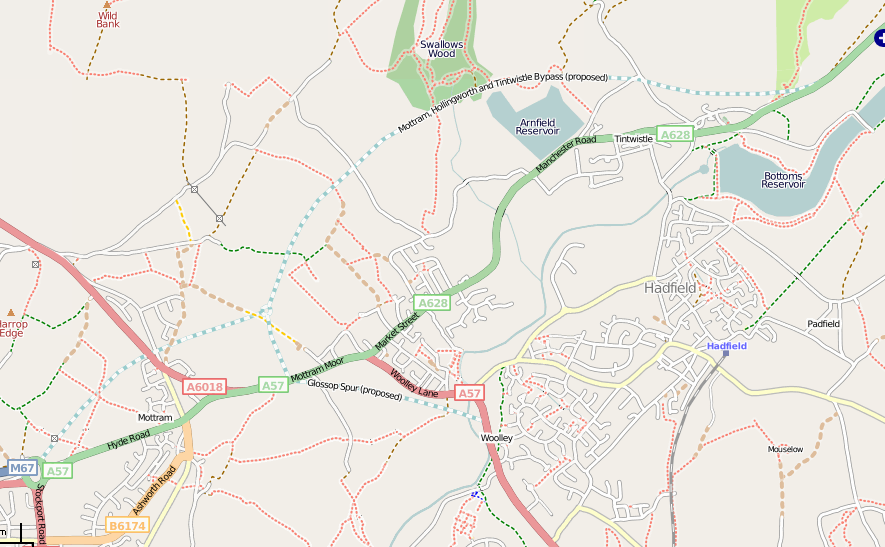
A map showing the proposed bypass route

The A628 trunk road connects the M67 motorway from Manchester to the M1 motorway in South Yorkshire. The road is single-carriageway through Mottram, Hollingworth and Tintwistle and through the Peak District National Park, it is used by large numbers of heavy goods vehicles. It is one of the most congested A-road routes in the country, with high volumes of traffic (including HGVs) using a road which is totally unsuitable for the volume and nature of traffic it carries The A628 through Mottram carries traffic from the A57 road linking Manchester through Glossop to Sheffield over the Snake Pass, another major Trans-Pennine route. Congestion at peak times backs up through Glossop and Hadfield rendering local journeys impossible. To solve these problems the Longdendale Bypass was approved in December 2014, but has not yet been started. There is considerable local feeling that there is no viable alternative to a bypass.

== Landmarks ==
St Michael and All Angels Church dates from the late 15th century and is a Grade II* listed building, constructed in the Perpendicular Gothic style. The interior of St Michael's was remodelled in 1854, while the exterior largely retains its original 15th and 16th-century character. The church stands prominently on Warhill, overlooking the village. In 2010 vandals destroyed the church's windows, which led to cork boards being used as temporary replacements.

Near the church is a cross, believed to be of medieval origin, which was restored in 1760 and again in 1897, the latter restoration commemorating the Diamond Jubilee of Queen Victoria. The octagonal shaft rises from a stepped circular ashlar plinth, and on its top sits a cubical sundial with three copper faces. This structure is also listed at Grade II*.

Mottram Old Hall is a Grade II listed country house on Old Hall Lane, part of which dates to 1727 and was once occupied by the Hollingworth family.

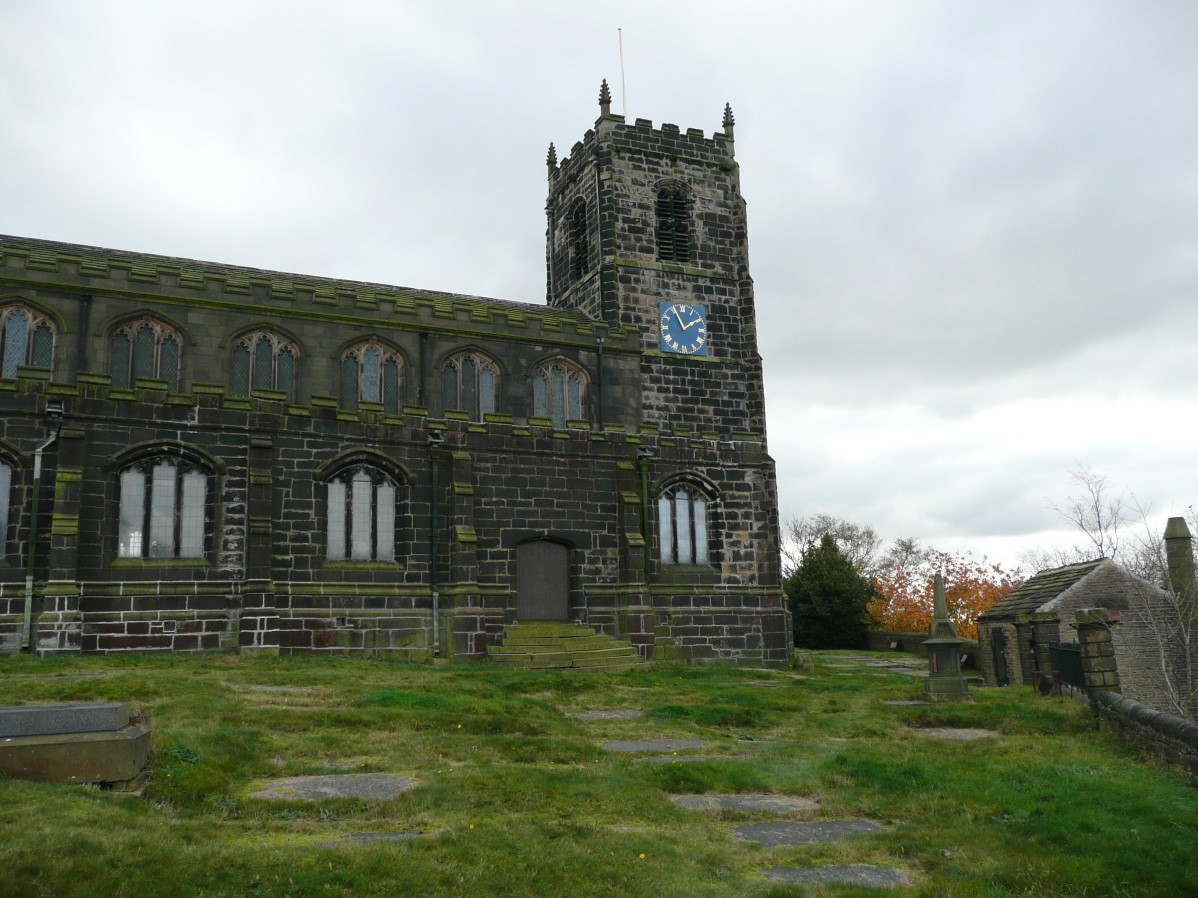
St Michael and All Angels Church

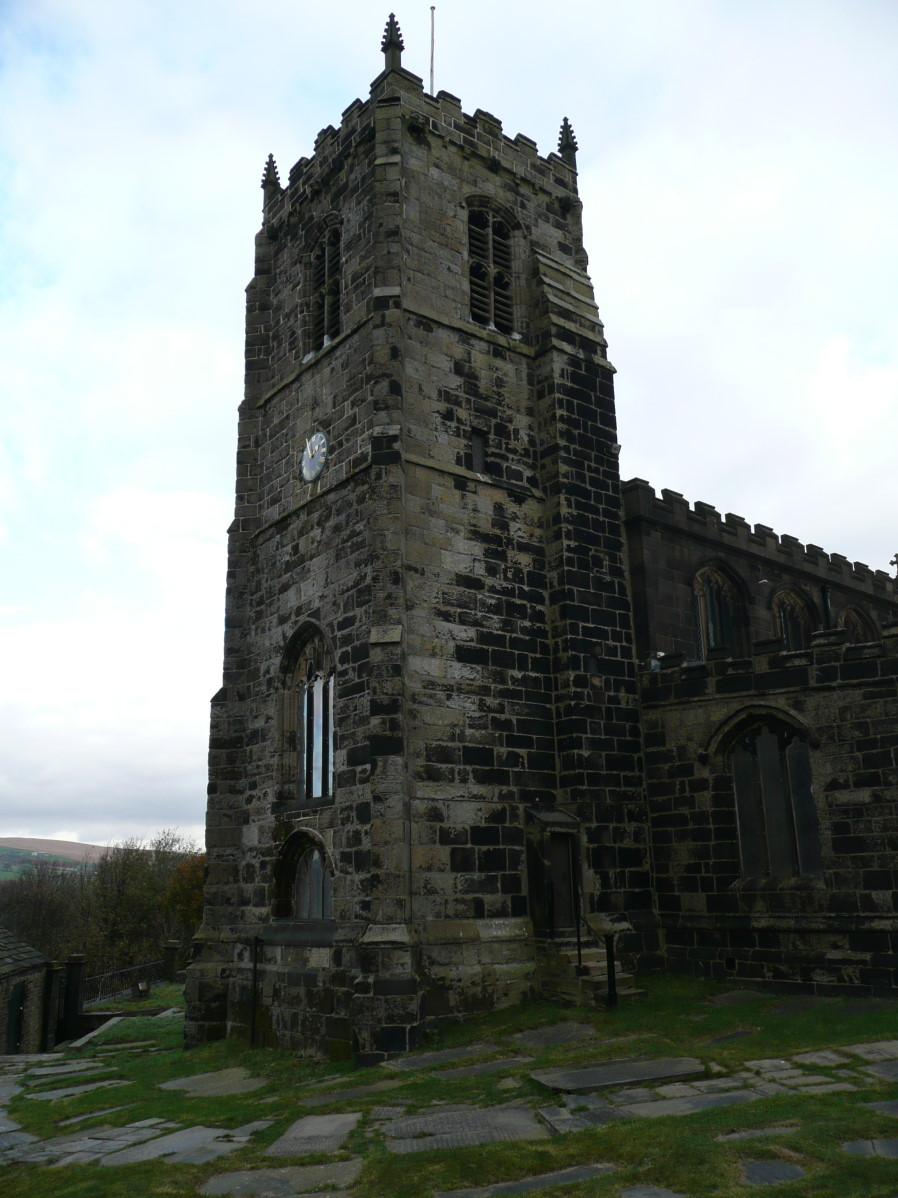
St Michael and All Angels Church

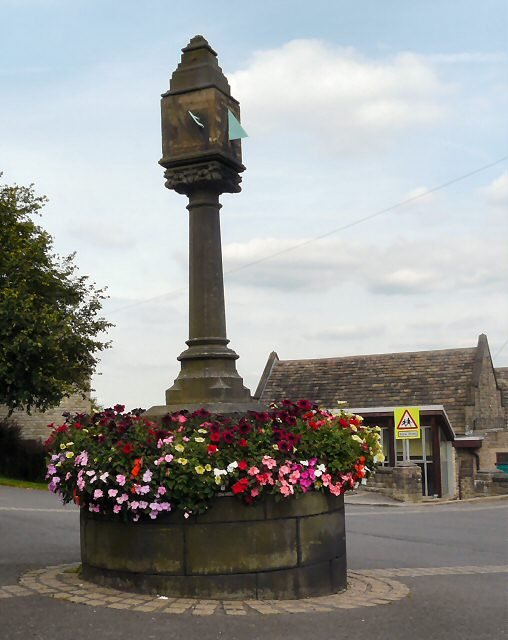
The cross

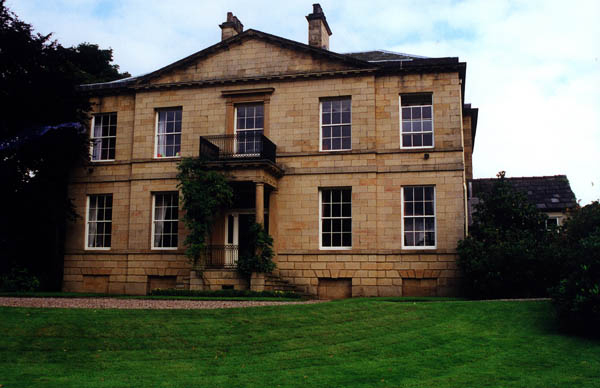
Mottram Old Hall

== Sport ==
Mottram Cricket Club plays in the Greater Manchester Cricket League. The club was founded in 1860.

== Notable people ==
- Sir Edmund Shaa (died 1488), a goldsmith, and Lord Mayor of London in 1482. He appeared as a character in William Shakespeare's play Richard III, and he made a bequest to found Stockport Grammar School.
- Laurence Earnshaw (c.1707–1767), an inventor and machine-maker, who made an astronomical clock, and a machine to spin and reel cotton in one operation.
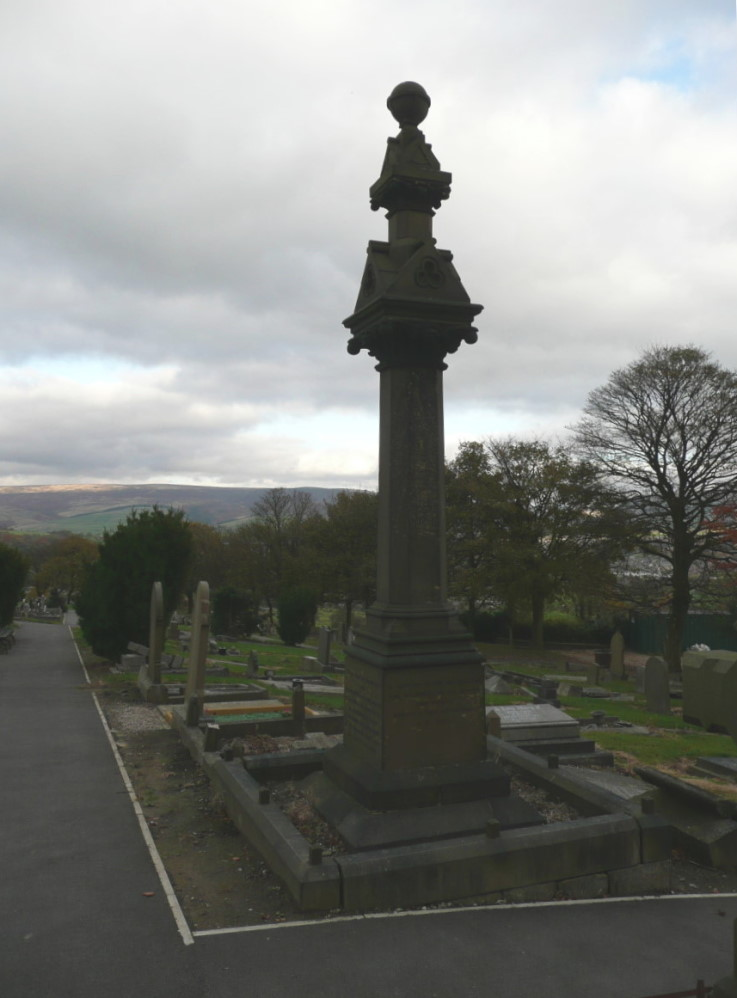
Earnshaw Memorial

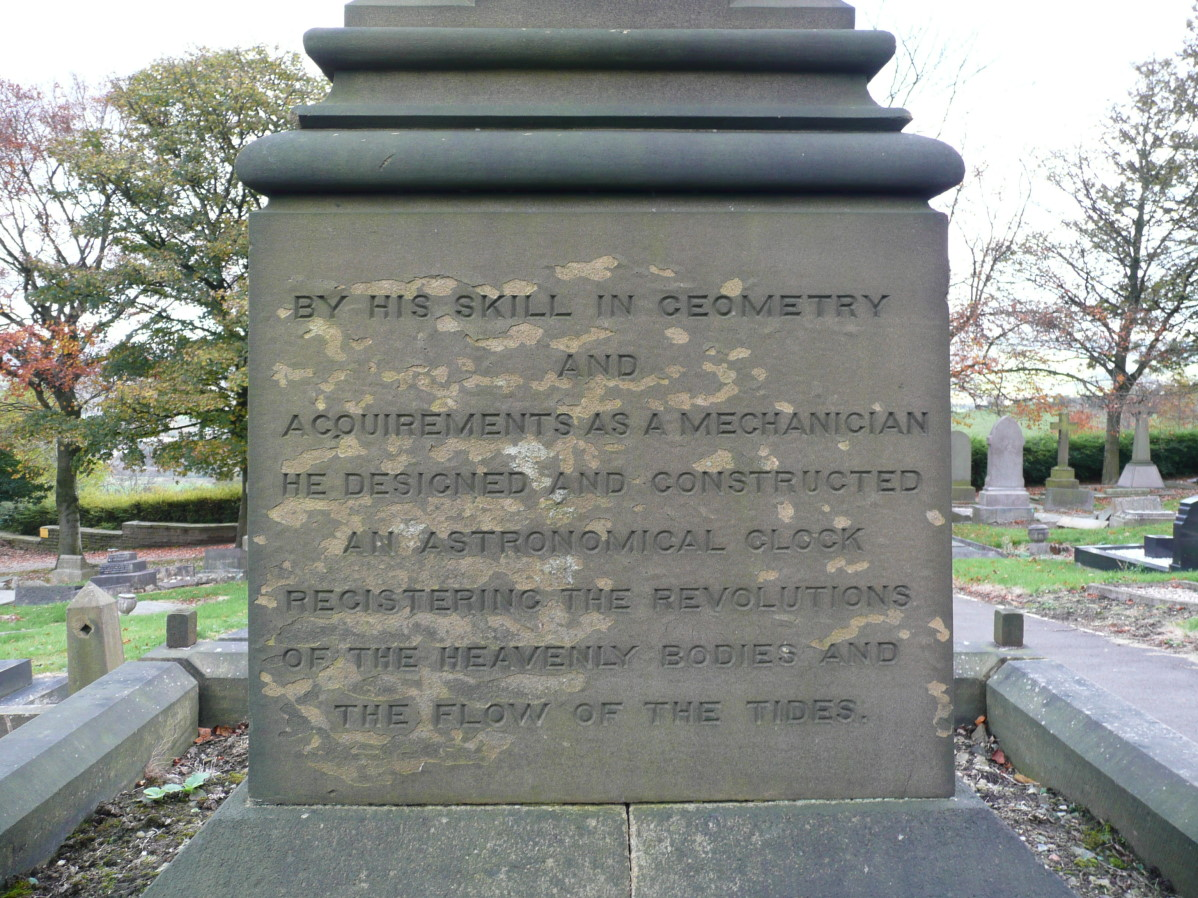

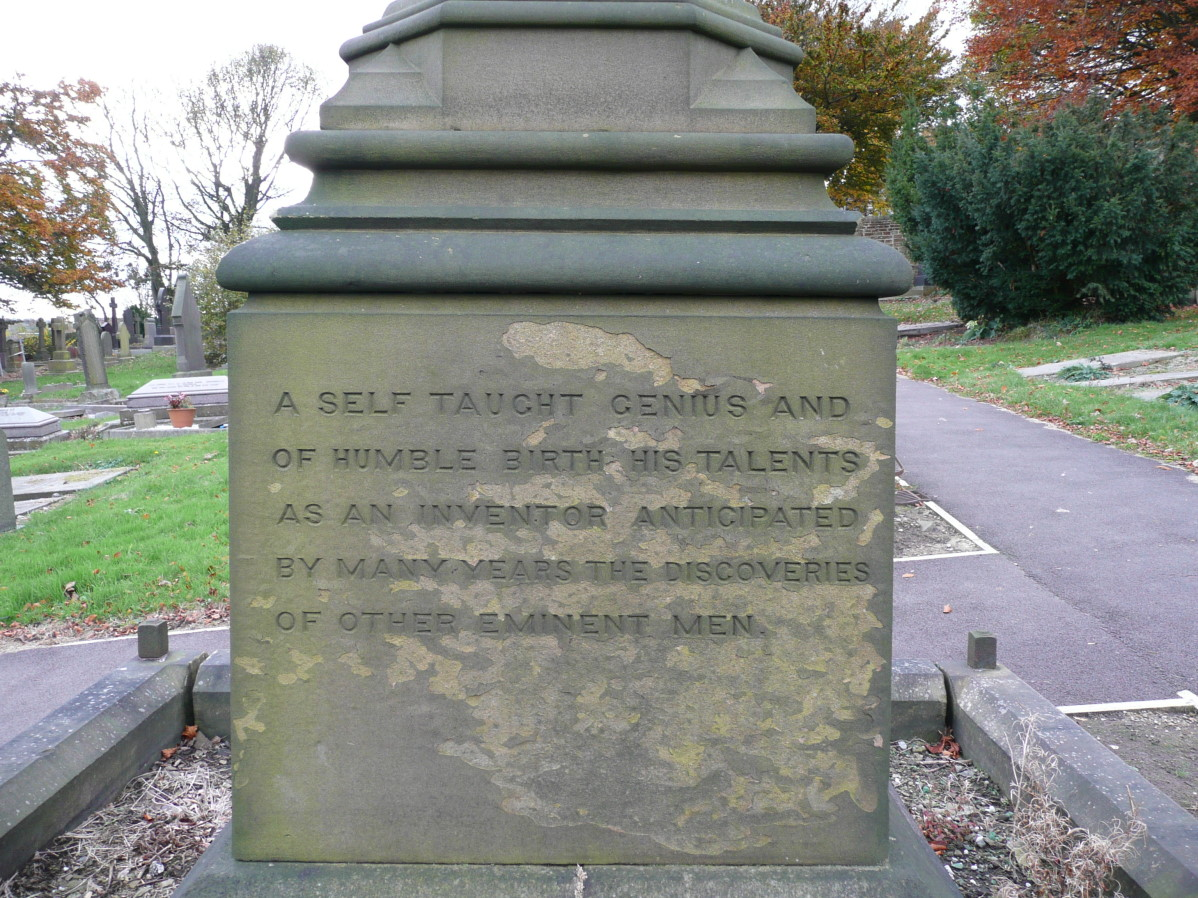
- John Holt (1743–1801), an English author, he published an agricultural survey of Lancashire in 1794.
- James Ridgway (1755–1838), publisher/bookseller, newspaper publisher and printseller of political pamphlets in London
- John Hatfield (1758?–1803), a notorious English forger, bigamist and imposter.
- John Chapman (1810–1877), MP for Great Grimsby, High Sheriff of Cheshire, JP and Chairman of the Manchester, Sheffield and Lincolnshire Railway. He lived in Broadbottom
- Edward Chapman (1839–1906), academic and politician, son of John Chapman, MP for Hyde, 1900-1906.
- L.S. Lowry (1887–1976), artist, born in Stretford, lived in Mottram from 1948 until his death. There is a bronze statue of him seated on a bench at the junction of Hyde Road and Stalybridge Road, and there is a commemorative plaque on his former home, "The Elms" on Stalybridge Road.
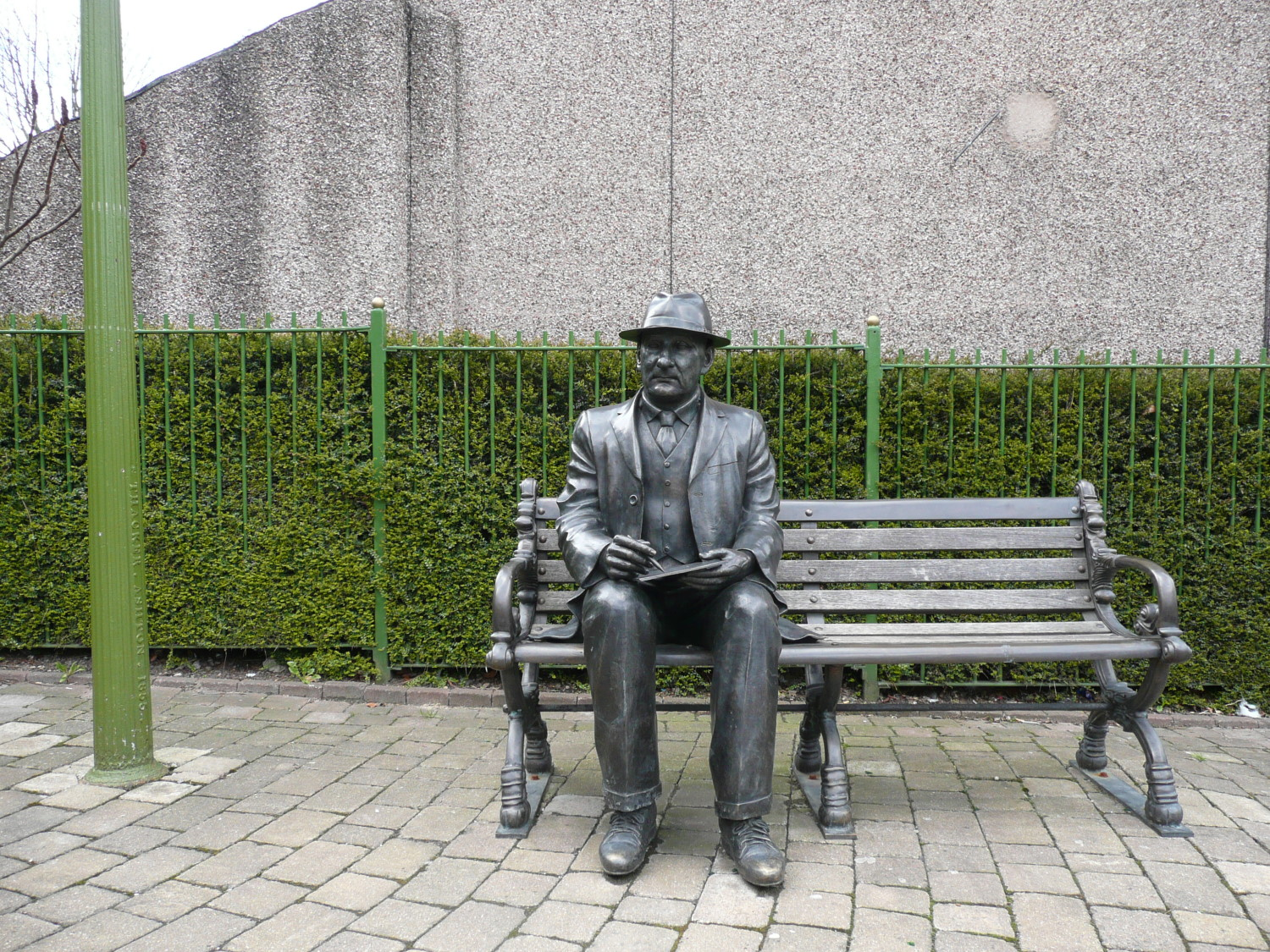
L.S. Lowry Memorial

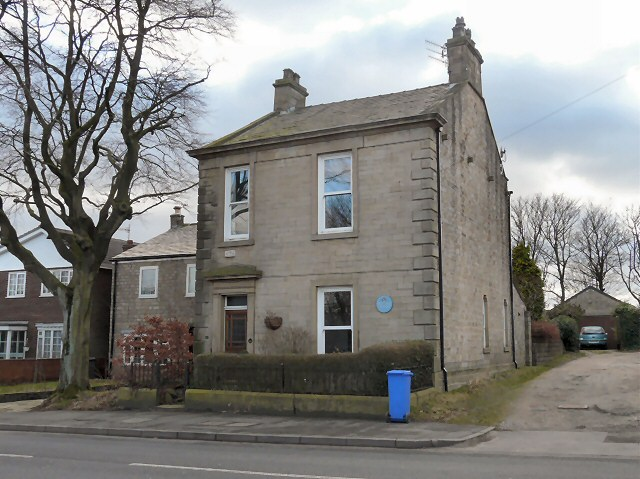
Lowry's former home, The Elms

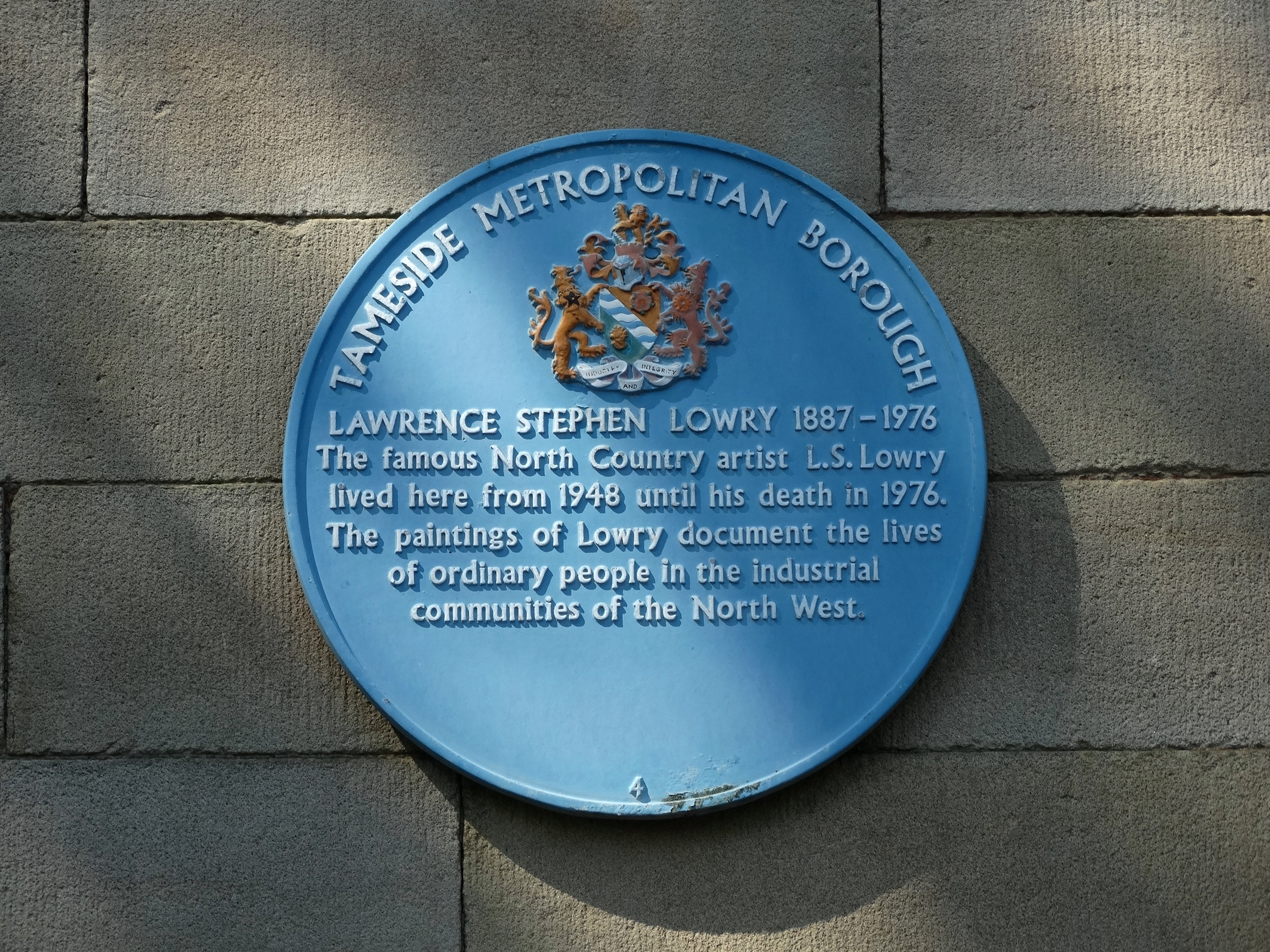
Lowry's Blue Plaque
- Kathy Staff (1928-2008), actress, played Nora Batty in the BBC sitcom Last of the Summer Wine
- Pat Gerrard Cooke (1935–2000), painter, illustrator and lifelong friend of artist L.S. Lowry
- Harold Shipman (1946–2004), the UK's most prolific serial killer.

== See also ==
- Listed buildings in Longdendale
- Mottram Tunnel
