= Mottram Old Hall, Tameside =

Mottram Old Hall
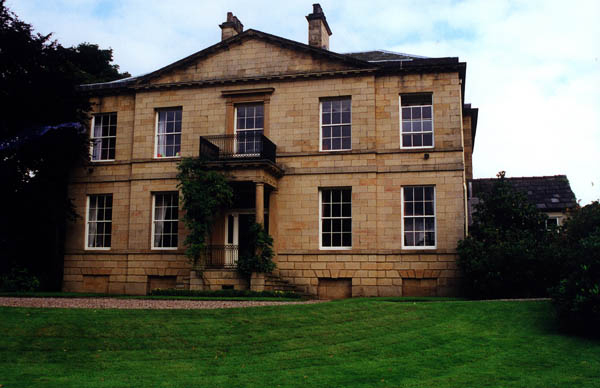
- Mottram Old Hall

- Location within Greater Manchester
- 53.4642°N 2.0114°W
- Location: Mottram in Longdendale

History
- Built: 1727

Site notes
- Restored: c. 1825

Listed Building – Grade II
- Official name: Ivydene, Mottram Old Hall
- Designated: 1 November 1966
- Reference no.: 1068065

Mottram Old Hall is a Grade-II-listed two-storey country house standing in a 6-hectare (15-acre) triangular park between Coach Lane and Old Hall Lane in Mottram in Longdendale, Greater Manchester, England.

The house was built in about 1825 in ashlar with a slate roof. Previously known as Ivydene, it incorporates a large rear wing built in 1727. The tree-lined drive, now known as Hall Drive, is residential and consists of large detached houses built in the 1960s leading to the main entrance of the Hall; the original mausoleum attached to the estate is still present on one side of Hall Drive.

Once owned by the Hollingworth family, it was renovated by the Hadfield family. It is still privately owned and not open to the public.

== History ==
In 1800 Samuel Hadfield bought the original hall from the Hollingworths and on his death in 1807 left it to his nephew George, who died there. After George's death, his brother Samuel erected a statue of him at the hall but only the plaque survives. The hall together with the Hadfield estate at Hadfield, passed after 1844 to George Woodhead, son of his George Hadfield's sister Martha. On his death and that of his sister Betsy Woodhead in 1861, both of whom were childless, the hall was inherited by John Wood of Arden Hall, Stockport. After passing through various other owners, Mottram Old Hall was purchased in 1962 by Judge Philip Curtis. Around 1970, The Hall was purchased at auction for £31,000 by local businessman Derek Hartle.

== See also ==
- Listed buildings in Longdendale
