= Longdendale High School =

Location
- Spring Street; Hollingworth; Hyde, Greater Manchester, SK14 8LW; England; 53.4638°N 1.9988°W

Information
- Type: Academy
- Established: 1 July 2017
- Local authority: Tameside
- Trust: Stamford Park Trust
- Department for Education URN: 148431 Tables
- Ofsted: Reports
- Head teacher: Michael Chiles
- Gender: Coeducational
- Age: 11 to 16
- Enrolment: 867
- Website: https://www.longdendalehighschool.org.uk/

Longdendale High School (formerly Longdendale Community Language College) is a coeducational secondary school located in Hollingworth, Greater Manchester, England. The school's Headteacher is Michael Chiles.

Previously a community school administered by Tameside Metropolitan Borough Council, in July 2017 Longdendale High School converted to academy status. From then the school was sponsored by the AspirePlus Educational Trust, however in January 2021 the school transferred to the Stamford Park Trust.

== Ofsted ==
In 2010 Ofsted inspected the school's MFL department. Teaching and learning in the department was judged to be satisfactory.
