= Broadbottom =

Village in Greater Manchester, England

Coordinates: 53.441°N 2.017°W

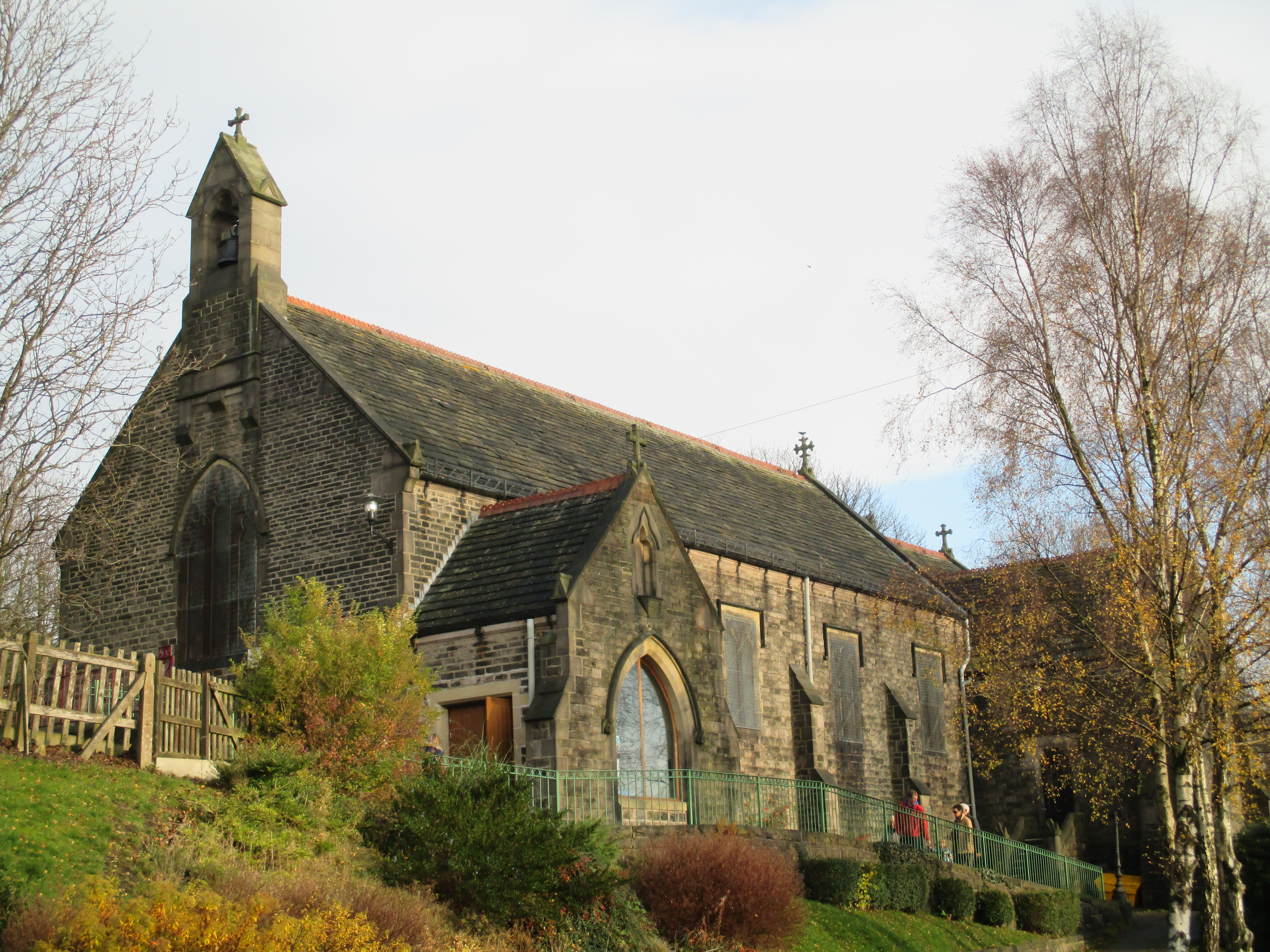
- Magdalene Centre, Broadbottom

- Location within Greater Manchester
- OS grid reference: SJ988938
- Metropolitan borough: Tameside
- Metropolitan county: Greater Manchester
- Region: North West
- Country: England
- Sovereign state: United Kingdom
- Post town: HYDE
- Postcode district: SK14
- Dialling code: 01457
- Police: Greater Manchester
- Fire: Greater Manchester
- Ambulance: North West
- UK Parliament: Stalybridge and Hyde

Broadbottom is a village in Tameside, Greater Manchester, England. Historically in Cheshire, it stands on the River Etherow which forms the border with Derbyshire.

== Description ==
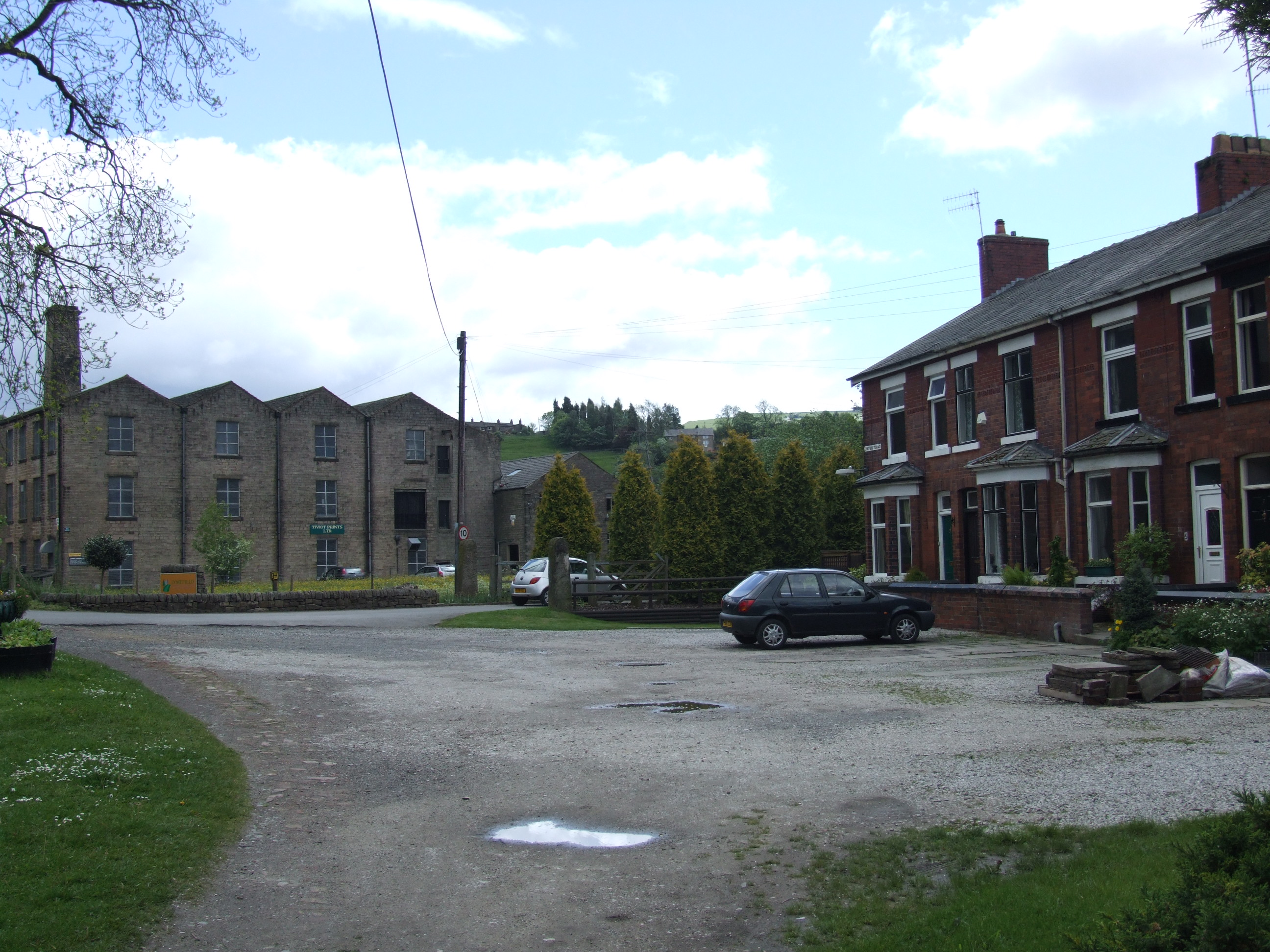
Lymefield Mill

Home Farm dates from 1604 and Broadbottom Hall from 1680.

There was a 14th-century water-powered corn mill and an 18th-century woollen mill, called Moss Mill, which converted to producing cotton in the 19th century.

Broadbottom has one remaining textile mill that is still operating called Lymefield Mill. The factory mill is next to the River Etherow and is currently occupied by Tiviot Prints Ltd.

== Landmarks ==
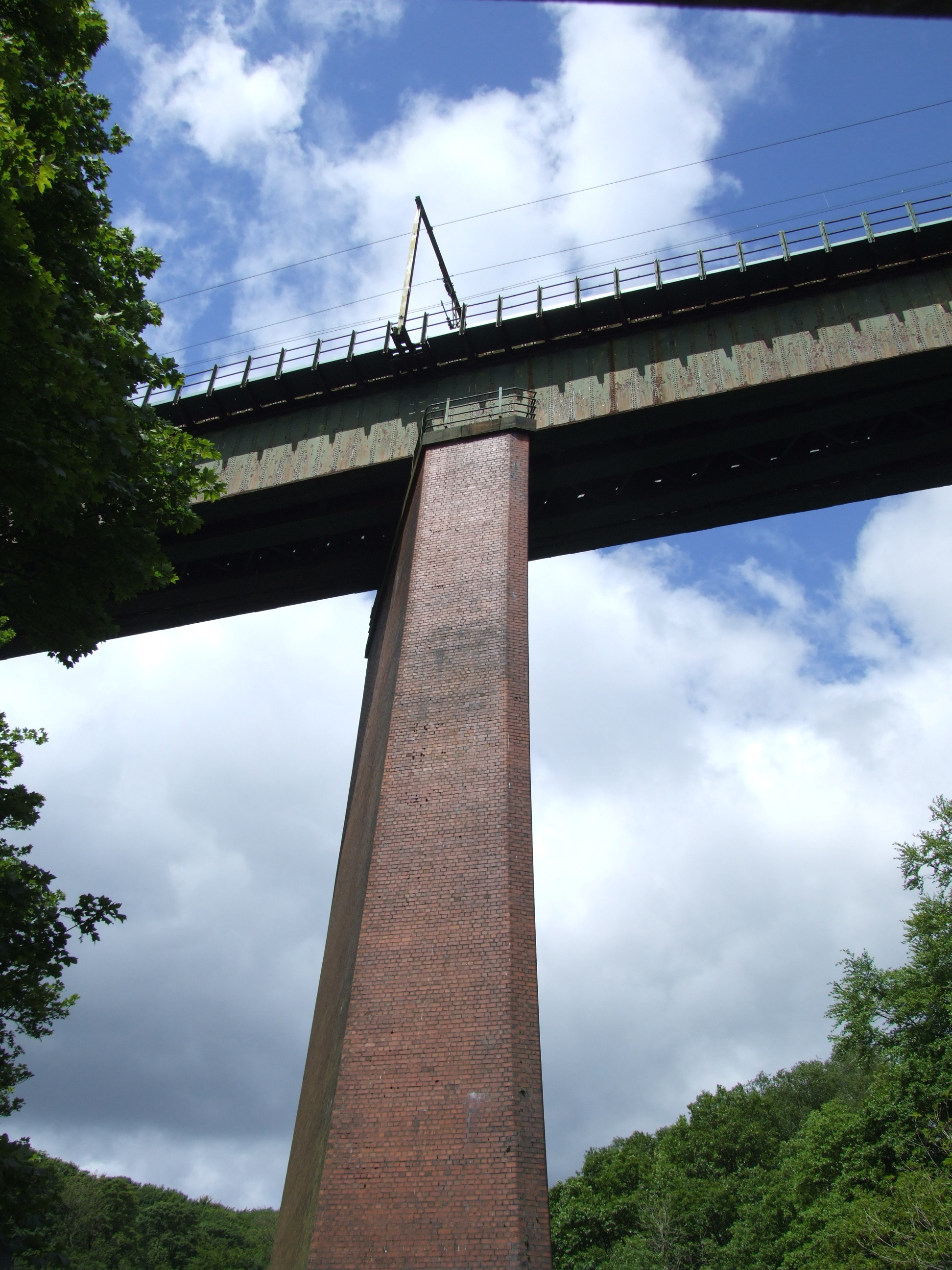

East of the railway station is Broadbottom Viaduct that carries the railway line 120 feet (37 m) over the River Etherow. The official length of the viaduct is 422 feet 6 inches (128.78 m).

At Summerbottom, there is a row of 18th-century weavers' cottages; they had a communal top floor where the looms were stored.

Hodge Printworks started out as a woollen mill in 1798. In 1805, it was converted into a dyeworks. The dyed cloth was of such high quality that some pieces are still on display in the Victoria and Albert Museum. In 1986, a team of archaeologists excavated the dye vats.

Best Hill Mill was started in 1784 by John Marsland, but closed in 1884. The mill reopened early in the 20th century to make tape and webbing for use in World War I. It closed again in 1930.

Broad Mills was a collection of mills (factories), including a calico printing mill, run by the Sidebottom family. In the 1840s, it ran 25,000 spindles and 1,500 looms; by 1860, there were 1,200 people working there. The mill was bought by the John Hirst & Sons in 1872. In 1889, it became part of Broadbottom Mills Ltd who also owned Lymefield Mill. In 1906, it passed to the Broad Mills Co. Ltd., who worked it until 1934 when they went into liquidation. A fire in the 1940s led to the mills' demolition in 1949. Lymefield Visitor Centre is close to the mills.

== Transport ==
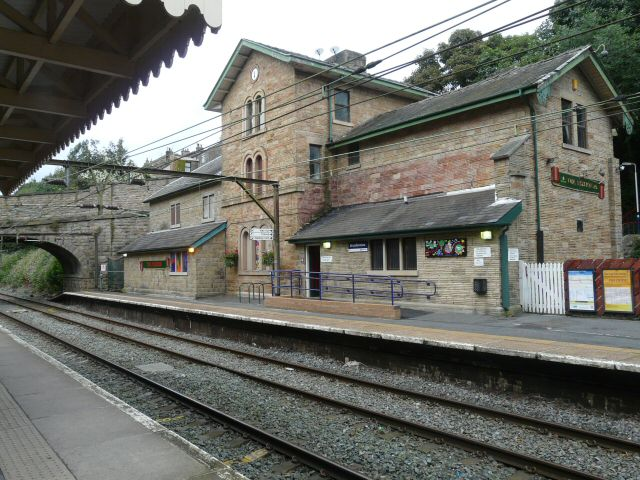
Broadbottom railway station in 2008

Broadbottom railway station is on the Glossop Line, 10 miles (16 km) east of Manchester Piccadilly.

Services, operated by Northern Trains, run generally half-hourly between Manchester Piccadilly, Glossop and Hadfield.

== Community ==
Broadbottom Community Association organises events throughout the year for the local residents; their programme can be found on their website. The BCA has published a book about the history of Broadbottom compiled by local resident Mollie Sayer.

Broadbottom Cricket Club plays in the Derbyshire and Cheshire League.

== Notable people ==
Actress Millie Gibson, known for Coronation Street and Doctor Who, hails from Broadbottom.

== See also ==
- Listed buildings in Longdendale
- Mottram in Longdendale (ancient parish)
- Unusual place names
