= British Rail Class 506 =

Class of electric multiple units

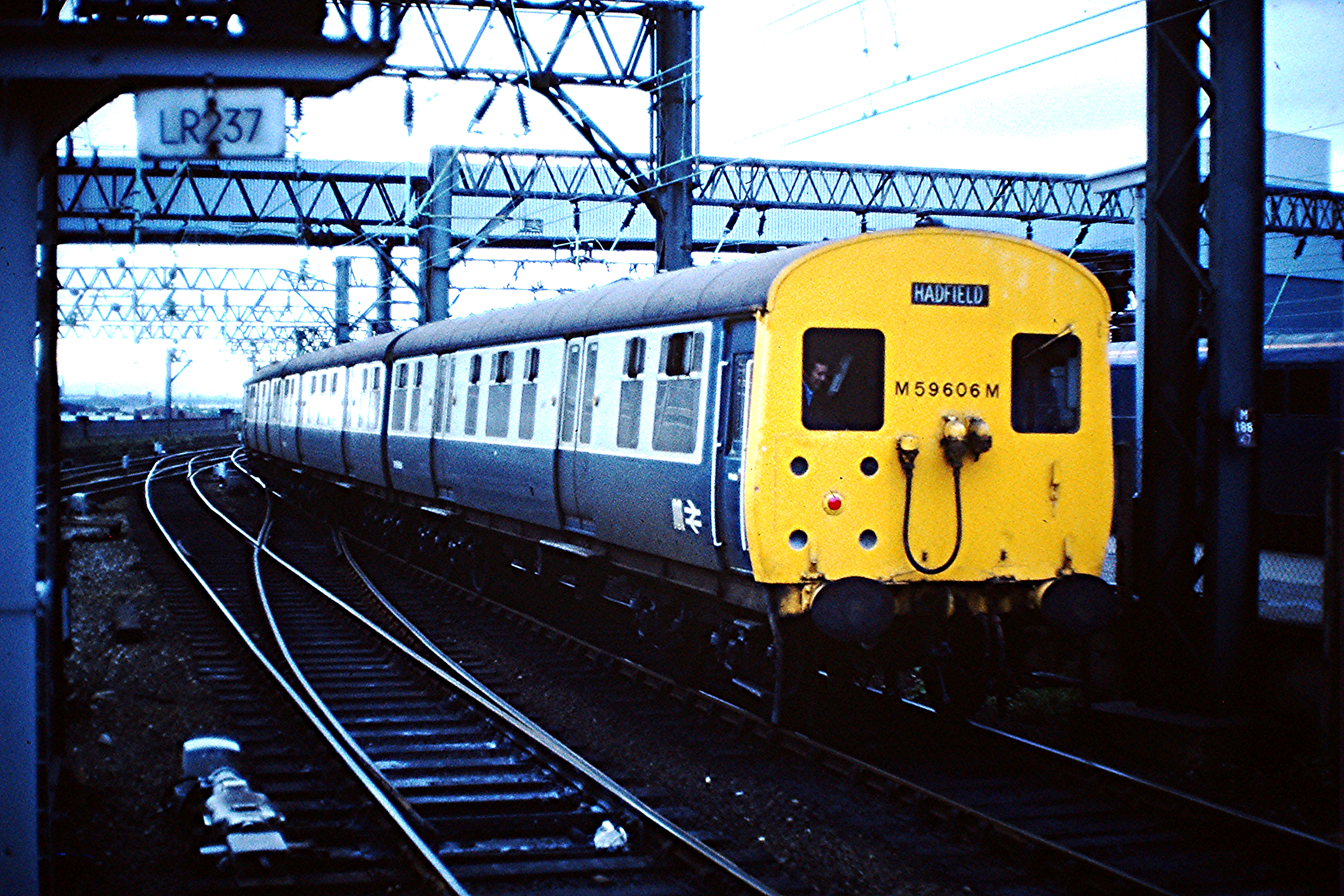
- Class 506 at Manchester Piccadilly in 1982
- In service: 1954–1984
- Manufacturers: Metro Cammell and Birmingham Railway Carriage and Wagon Company
- Number built: 8 trainsets
- Formation: 3 cars per trainset
- Capacity: MOBS 52 seats, TOS 64 seats, DTOS 60 seats.
- Operator: British Rail
- Lines served: Woodhead line; Glossop line

Specifications
- Train length: 177 ft 10 in (54.20 m)
- Width: 9 ft 3 in (2.82 m)
- Height: 12 ft 8 1/4 in (3.87 m)
- Maximum speed: 75 mph (121 km/h)
- Weight: MOBS 50 long tons 12 cwt (51.4 t; 56.7 short tons), TOS 26 long tons 8 cwt (26.8 t; 29.6 short tons), DTOS 27 long tons 9 cwt (27.9 t; 30.7 short tons)
- Power output: 740 hp (550 kW) per 3-car set
- Electric system: 1,500 V DC overhead
- Current collection: pantograph
- Track gauge: 4 ft 8 1/2 in (1,435 mm) standard gauge

The British Rail Class 506 was a 3 carriage electric multiple unit (EMU) built for local services between Manchester, Glossop and Hadfield on the Woodhead Line, which was electrified in 1954 on the 1,500 V DC overhead system.

== Design ==
There were eight three-car units, ordered in 1938 by the LNER and built in 1950, but they did not enter service until June 1954. Similar in design to the Class 306 EMUs (prior to their conversion to 25 kV 50 Hz AC operation), and built on the same production lines (making a total of 100 units of basically similar design), they were equipped with air-operated sliding doors.

== Formation ==
Each unit was formed of a Driving Motor Brake Third (seating 52); a Trailer Composite (seating 24 first class and 38 third class passengers); and a Driving Trailer Third (seating 60). Third class was redesignated Second across the whole of BR on 3 June 1956, while the first class seating of these units was declassified to second in early 1960.

The eight 3-car sets were formed into 6-car trains at peak hours. The frequency of the Glossop/Hadfield service at peak times was every 30 minutes, and the round trip took nearly 90 minutes, requiring six of the eight units in service each weekday. With one spare unit, and one away for works overhaul at a time, there was no scope to use the units for other tasks.

== Electrical equipment ==
The EMUs were equipped with a single diamond-shaped pantograph, mounted over the driver's cab and adjacent guard's compartment at the outer end of the driving motor carriage. This gave a ready identification feature because, following the withdrawal of the Manchester-Altrincham units in May 1971, all other overhead-line EMUs operating in the Manchester area had the motor coach, and thus the pantograph, in the middle of the unit.

Unlike the similar Class 306, the eight Class 506 units remained solely equipped for 1,500 V DC operation for their entire lives. This made them unable to operate on any lines away from the Woodhead route when other lines changed to AC operation. They rarely operated east of Hadfield anyway, due to low gearing and the risk of overheating; however, trials were conducted in 1969 to assess the possibility of use through the Woodhead Tunnel.

=== Motors ===
Each power car had four 185 hp GEC traction motors, giving a total of 740 hp per 3-car set.

== Numbering ==
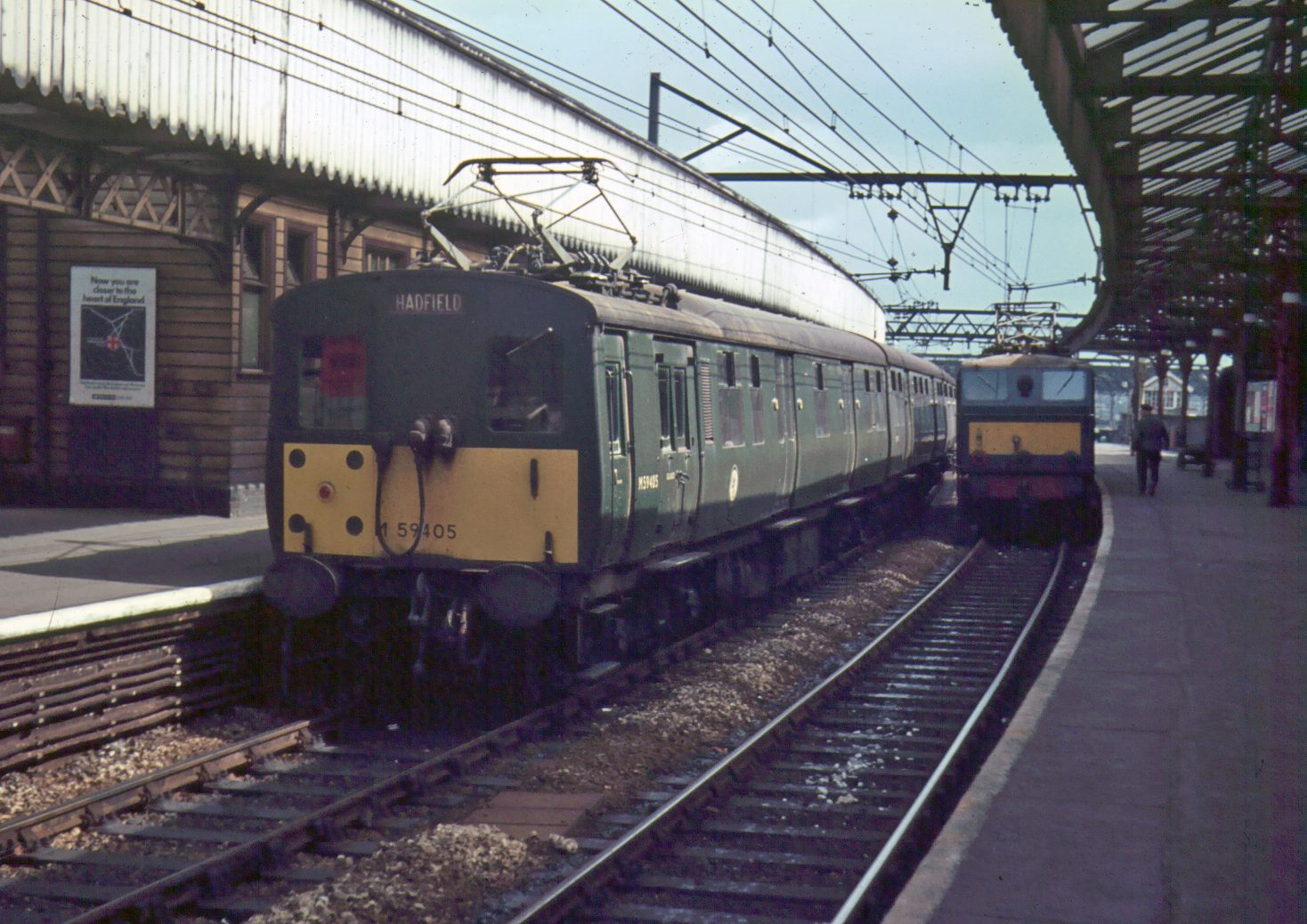
A Class 506 (left) at Guide Bridge in 1967.

British Railways numbers were:

- Motor Open Brake Second
  - M59401-M59408 (8 cars 1954, Met-Cam)
- Trailer Open Second (built as Trailer Composite, declassified early 1960)
  - M59501-M59508 (8 cars 1954, Met-Cam)
- Driving Trailer Open Second
  - M59601-M59608 (8 cars 1954, BRCW)

Being built against an LNER order, the numbers were in the former LNER series. To distinguish these from other similarly-numbered carriages, BR used letter prefixes and suffixes, but these varied. At the time that they were delivered, the numbers were in fact unique; but from 1959, new Diesel multiple-units were delivered carrying similar numbers, in the BR series. The Manchester-Glossop-Hadfield EMU number prefixes and suffixes may be summarised thus:

- as new — prefix "E" to denote allocation to the Eastern Region, i.e. E59401 etc.
- by 21 September 1957 — suffix "E" added to denote former LNER number series, i.e. E59401E etc.
- 1 February 1958 — prefix altered to "M" following transfer of route to London Midland Region, i.e. M59401E etc.
- circa 1968 — suffix altered to "M" implying transfer to former LMS number series, i.e. M59401M etc.

The "E" suffix seems to have been dropped a few years prior to the change to "M"; photographs exist from the 1964–1968 period showing unsuffixed numbers, including M59404, M59405 and M59408.

No unit numbers were carried, however the cars were normally formed so that the last two digits corresponded, i.e. 59401-59501-59601 etc., and the units were known locally as 01, 02, etc. On the few occasions that units were reformed, one car would be renumbered to correspond with the others in its new unit; thus 59406 became 59408 in December 1983 (59506, 59606 and the real 59408 being withdrawn); while 59401 (crudely renumbered 59402) was formed with 59502 and 59602 about September 1984 (59501, 59601 and the real 59402 being stored out of service).

There is a suggestion that the motor coaches would originally have been numbered 29401-8, but this may be a typo - the initial digit "2" would imply the North Eastern Area of the former LNER, while "5" denotes the Great Central Section.

== Classification ==
Originally, no special class code was allotted, the units being known as "Manchester-Glossop-Hadfield" stock. The class were officially numbered 506 under the TOPS system, however they never carried 506xxx numbers in service.

The individual coach types were in the Eastern Region carriage diagram book as Dia. 363F (Driving Motor), 366 (Trailer) and 365F (Driving Trailer). Under TOPS, design codes EB2.05.0A, EH2.04.0A and EE2.04.0A respectively were allotted.

== Operational history ==
The class operated local services between Manchester Piccadilly, Glossop and Hadfield on the Woodhead Line.

Following the closure of Reddish depot in 1983, units had to be diesel-hauled from Longsight depot to their usual route, due to incompatibility with the available 25kV power supply.

=== Accidents and incidents ===
On 21 May 1970 the 22:45 Manchester Piccadilly to Hadfield was on the up fast line passing Audenshaw Junction near Guide Bridge when the middle and rear cars were diverted onto the up slow line due to the points being changed underneath the train. The middle car turned on its side as a result and was dragged for 90 yards before coming to rest against an overbridge. Two passengers were killed and 13 injured.

== Withdrawal ==
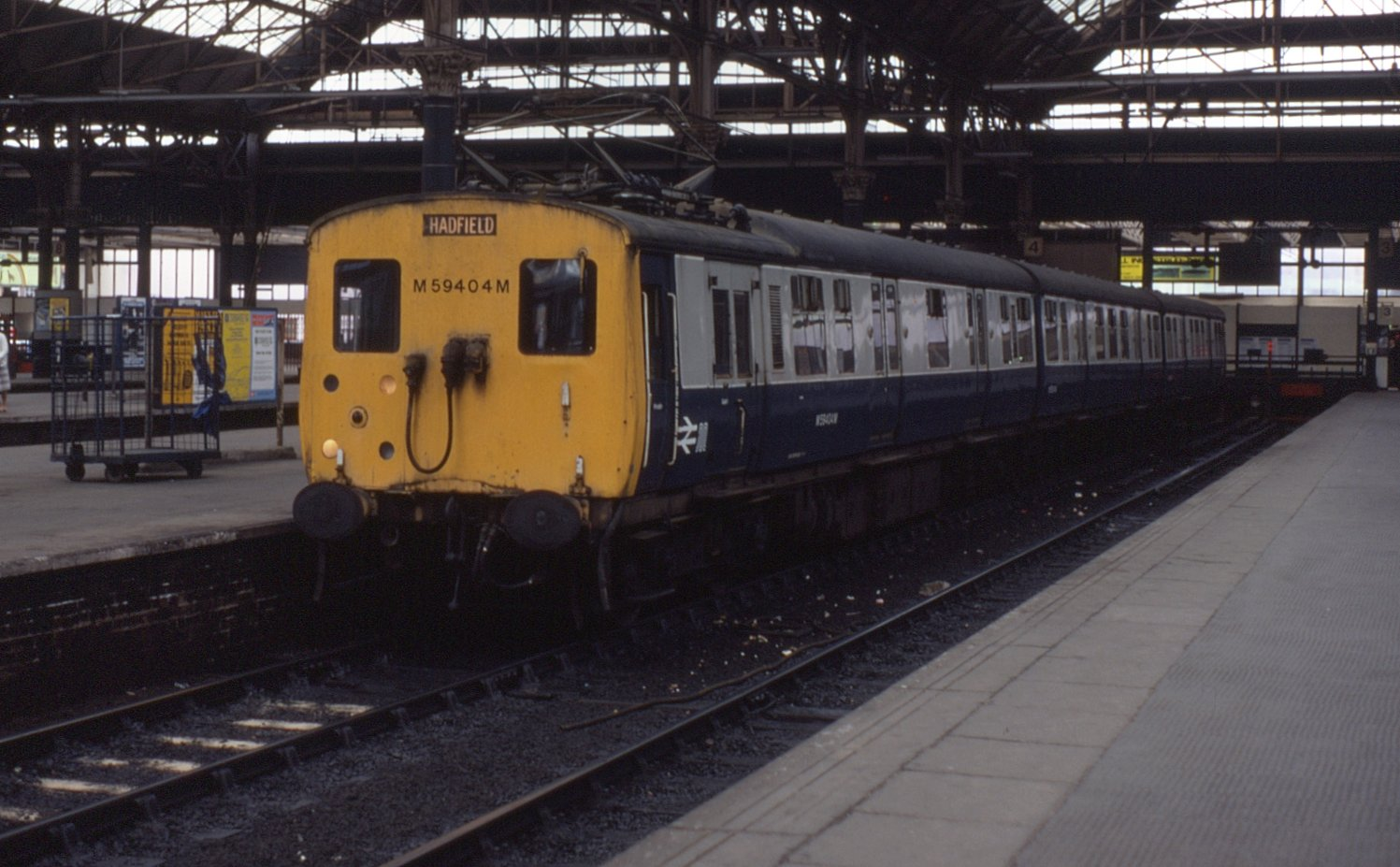
A Class 506 at Manchester Piccadilly in 1984, shortly before withdrawal.

In 1981, the Woodhead line was closed east of Hadfield. In December 1984, the remaining section was converted to the standard 25 kV AC overhead system and the Class 506 EMUs were withdrawn following the last run on 7 December.

After their withdrawal, unit 59404-59504-59604 was set aside for preservation, but the rest were all sent to Vic Berry in Leicester for scrap; they were cut up in April 1985.

== Preservation ==
One complete unit was scheduled for preservation by the West Yorkshire Transport Museum; it was based originally at Dinting Railway Museum. It then moved to the former Bradford Hammerton Street Depot and finally on to the Midland Railway - Butterley.

It deteriorated severely; two cars, and most of the third, were scrapped in August 1995 by CF Booth in Rotherham. All that remains is a severed driving end of a motor open brake second, M59404, which was preserved at the Electric Railway Museum, Warwickshire until its closure in 2017, and is now at The Cab Yard in Wales, intended for future display at a Welsh heritage railway.

== See also ==
- Glossop Line
- Woodhead Line
- Manchester-Sheffield-Wath electric railway
