= Woolley Bridge =

Coordinates: 53°27′32″N 1°59′15″W

- Location within Derbyshire
- Country: England
- Region: North West England (part), East Midlands (part)
- County: Greater Manchester (part), Derbyshire (part)
- District: Tameside (part), High Peak (part)

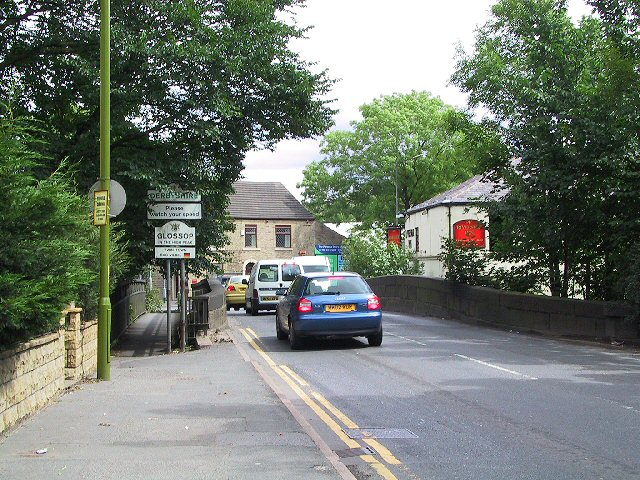

Woolley Bridge is an area in Glossopdale, on the border of Greater Manchester and Derbyshire in England. It lies 10 miles from Manchester city centre. It is in the ward of Hadfield South. Nearby places include Hollingworth, Tintwistle, Dinting Vale, Gamesley, Glossop and Mottram.

== See also ==
- List of places in Derbyshire
