= Abbot's Chair =

Remains of former monastic cross in North Wales

Coordinates: 53.40951°N 1.95784°W

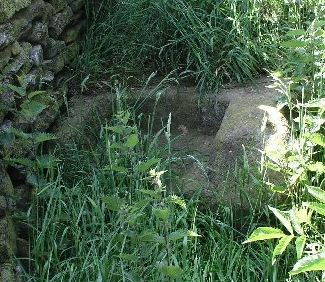
The Abbot's Chair

The Abbot's Chair is the common name of a former monastic cross, the Charlesworth Cross. Only the socket remains of this boundary cross, built by the monks of Basingwerk Abbey in North Wales. Henry II of England gave the manor of Glossop to the monks, and they gained a market charter for Glossop in 1290, and one for Charlesworth in 1328. In 1433 the monks leased all of Glossopdale to the Talbot family, later Earls of Shrewsbury.

It is close to the town of Glossop in the High Peak borough of the English county of Derbyshire, on the so-called Monks Road, near the entrance track to Taiga Farm. The monks used this route in order to reach Hayfield, Simmondley and other villages.

== See also ==
- List of places in Derbyshire
