= Dinting Viaduct =

Bridge in Glossop, Derbyshire

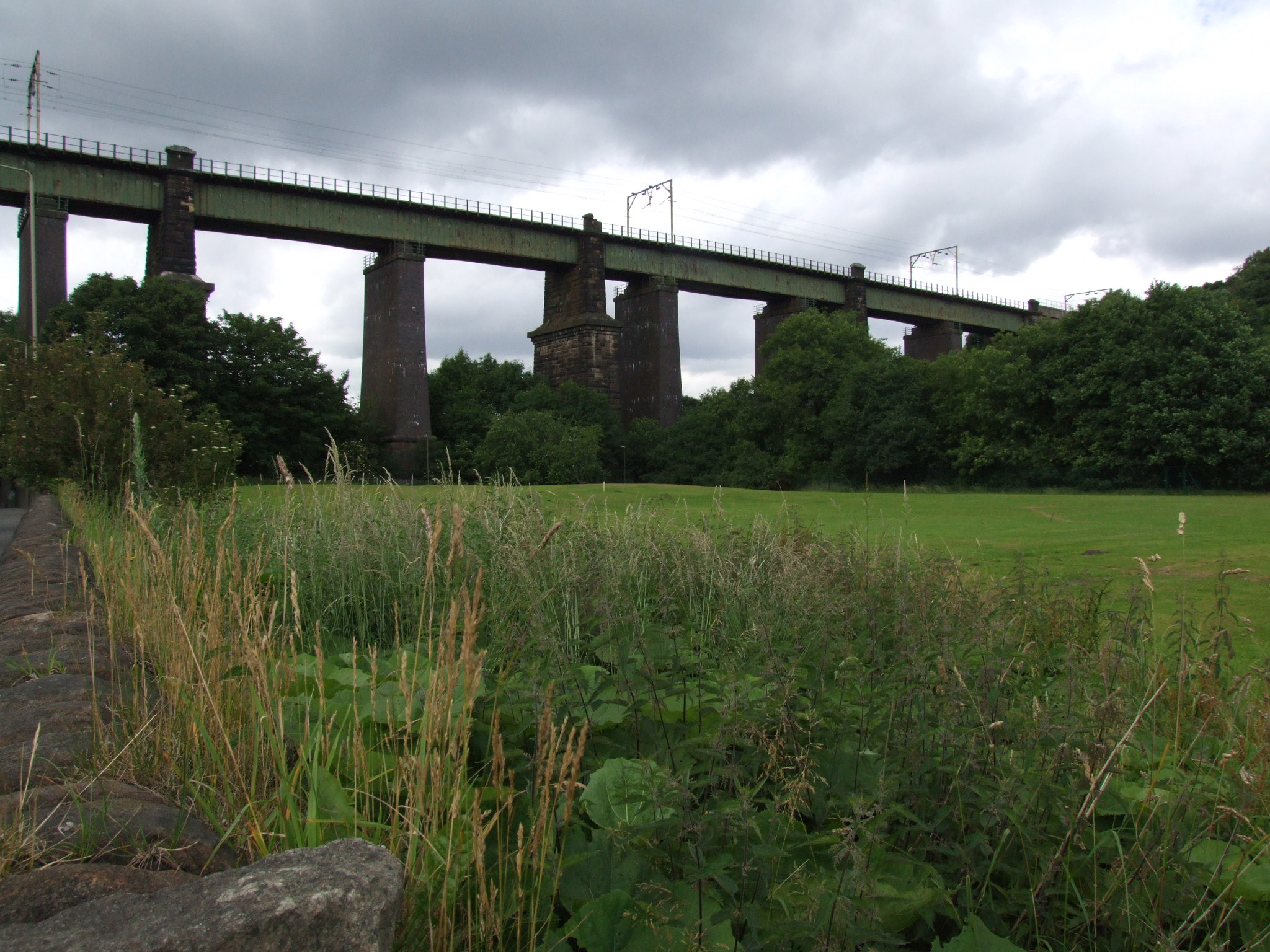
- The central section as viewed from the A57; 2008
- Coordinates: 53.447554°N 1.972529°W
- Carries: Glossop Line
- Crosses: Dinting Vale; Glossop Brook; A57
- Locale: Glossop, Derbyshire, England
- Other name: Dinting Arches
- Maintained by: Network Rail

Characteristics
- Total length: 1,200 feet (370 m)
- Height: 119 feet (36 m)
- Design life: 1842: Five laminated wooden arches atop stone piers 1859-60: Arches replaced with wrought-iron girders 1918-20: Seven additional supporting brick piers added

History
- Construction start: 5 March 1842
- Opened: 8 August 1844

Location
- Interactive map of Dinting Viaduct

Dinting Viaduct (also known as Dinting Arches) is a 19th-century railway viaduct in Glossopdale in Derbyshire, England, that carries the Glossop Line over a valley at the village of Dinting. It crosses the Glossop Brook and the A57 road between Manchester and Sheffield.

First opened in 1844 as part of the original Woodhead Line by the Sheffield, Ashton-under-Lyne and Manchester Railway (later the MSLR and GCR), the viaduct has been modified a number of times, most notably by the addition of seven brick strengthening piers in 1918–20. The viaduct comprises three sections: starting from the south end, there is a series of seven stone arches, each 50 feet (15 m) wide. The central section consists of five openings (later divided by strengthening piers). A further four stone arches take the railway to the northerly junction with the branch to Hadfield and into Dinting station. It is of similar design to the shorter Broadbottom Viaduct about 1.5 miles (2.4 km) west down the same line, which crosses the River Etherow at Broadbottom.

== Design ==
Dinting is much the larger of two similar viaducts on the line (the other being the Broadbottom Viaduct), both of which are significant for their height. It has four main spans, each of four ribs, flanked by eleven brick-built, semi-circular approach arches, each with a fifty-foot (fifteen-metre) span—four at one end and seven at the other. Seven intermediate supporting piers were added in 1919, constructed of blue brick and irregularly spaced to avoid the road and river beneath, thus resulting in the loss of the viaduct's symmetry. This alteration was criticised by the architectural writer Nikolaus Pevsner.

== History ==
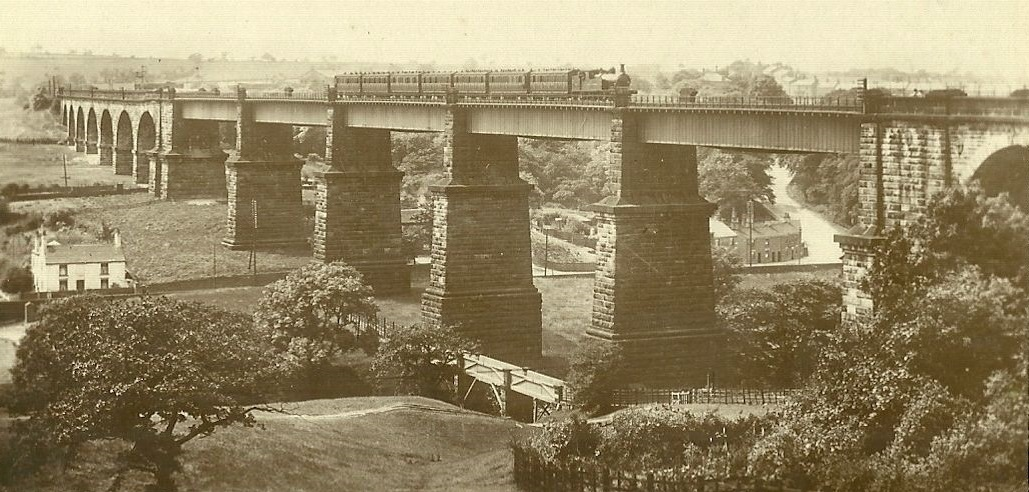
A 1916 postcard showing the viaduct before the brick strengthening piers were added

The modern-day Glossop branch line originally opened as the Woodhead Line in December 1845, which linked Sheffield to Manchester. It was closed in 1981 leaving only the Manchester to Glossop/Hadfield section still in operation. The viaduct over the River Etherow at Broadbottom had been completed in December 1842, extending train services to Broadbottom, with the contract for the Dinting viaduct being let in June that year. In August 1844 the bridge was opened allowing trains to reach Hadfield and Glossop from Manchester. The original construction of the two bridges used laminated timber arches.

By 1856, the level of rail traffic and the weight of the trains had increased so much that the existing timber viaducts were considered inadequate, and in 1859 wrought-iron girders were installed to replace the timber arches. By early the following year, this work had been completed on both bridges. Over the next 60 years, the level of traffic increased yet further, partly due to the heightened use of coal trains, so that the 1859 works became insufficient to deal with the weight. Seven brick strengthening piers were inserted during the years 1918–20, and again at Broadbottom, leaving the irregular pattern of piers seen today.

Major work was carried out in the 1950s in preparation for the electrification of the line. The first electric train travelled over in 1954.

In 2012–13, an extensive refurbishment was undertaken by Network Rail, the viaduct's maintainer, including strengthening the girders, installing new bearings and repairs to the steel, brickwork and masonry. It was also repainted olive green. The scheme cost £6.4 million.

=== Deaths of 1855 ===
On the night of 18 September 1855, a passenger train was halted on the viaduct to let a returning wakes week excursion train clear Dinting station just ahead. The night was "exceedingly dark", causing some of the passengers to mistakenly think they had arrived at the station platform. From one carriage, three people left the train, stepping onto the low parapet of the viaduct, and fell to their deaths; another was pulled back from the door as passengers realised they were on the viaduct. After a few minutes, the viaduct night watchman found the three of them lying side by side on the grass in the valley. Two had been instantly killed, and the third died within an hour.

The following day, an inquest was opened at the Plough Inn, Dinting, where the deceased were confirmed to be Jane Hadfield, John Healey and Thomas Priestnall. It returned a verdict of accidental death and recommended the railway company put up a fence on the parapet of the viaduct to prevent similar accidents, and to move the signal closer to Manchester so that passenger trains cannot stop on the viaduct.

== Gallery ==
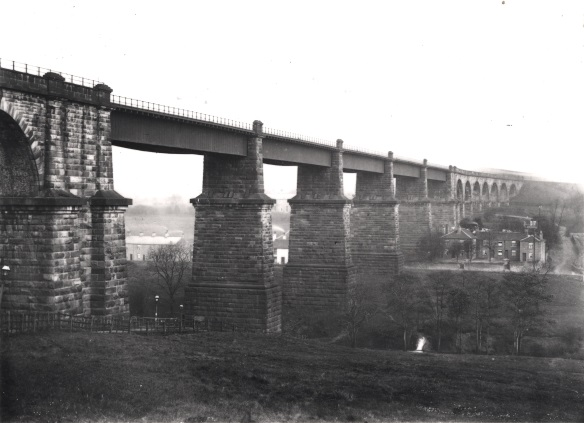
A 1903 view before the addition brick strengthening piers

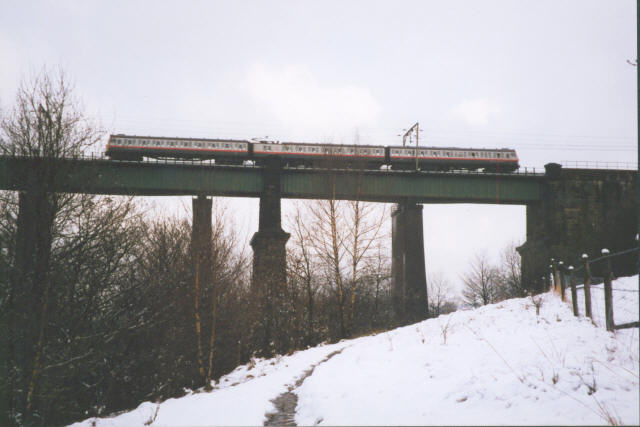
The viaduct in April 1994

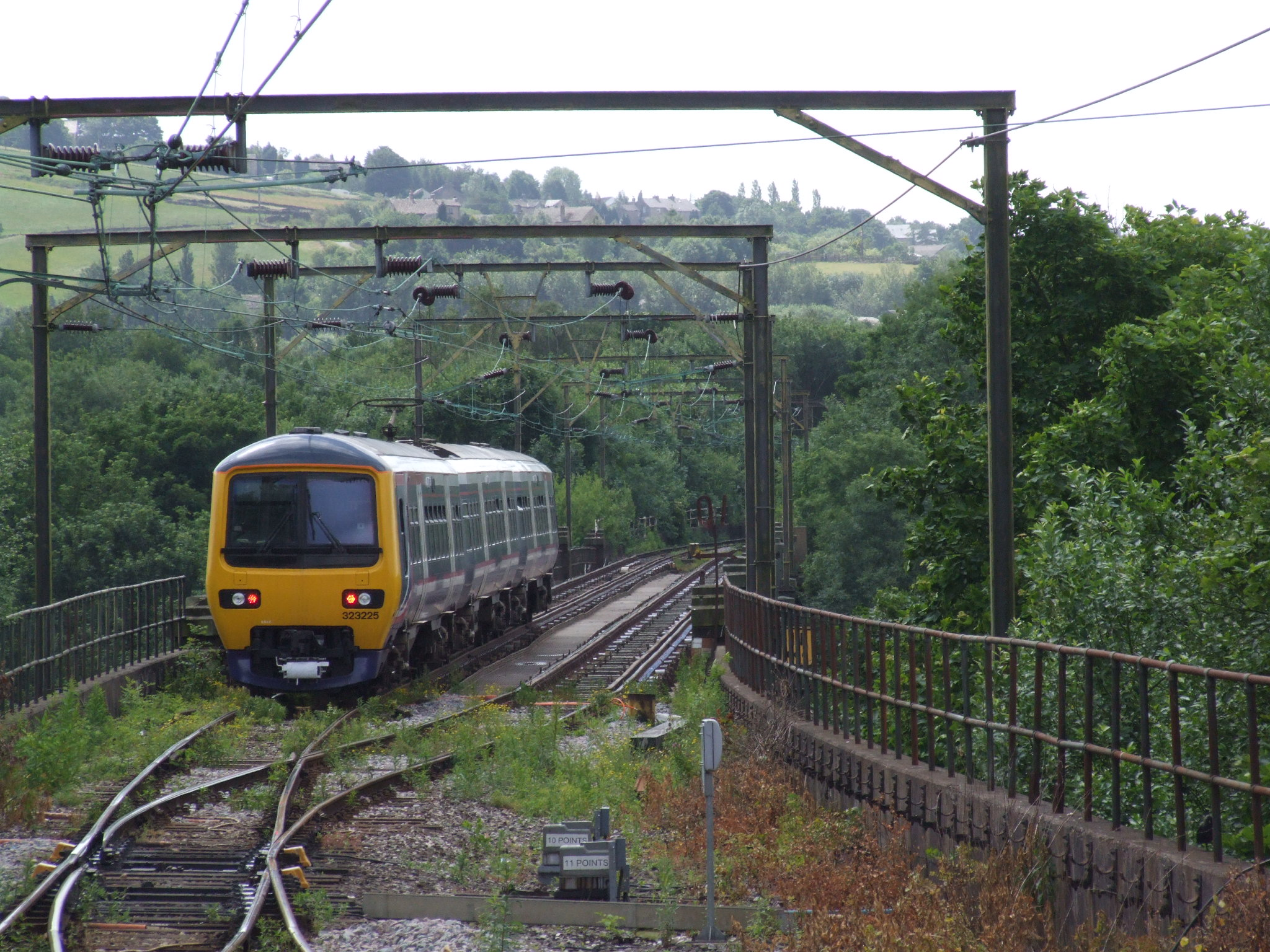
A Class 323 EMU crossing the viaduct in 2008

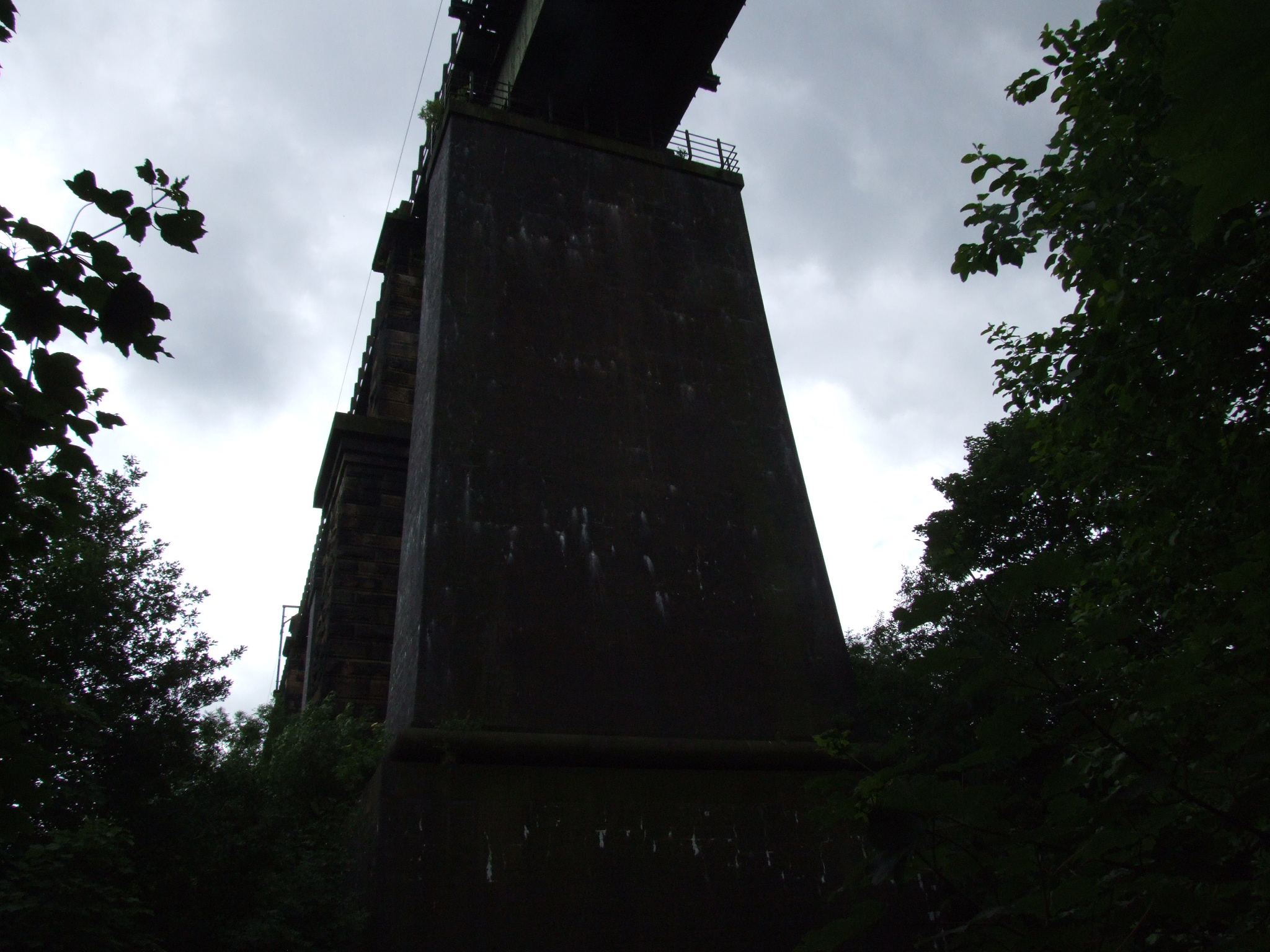
A brick strengthening pier from below

== See also ==
- List of railway bridges and viaducts in the United Kingdom
