= Dinting Vale =

Village in Derbyshire, England

Coordinates: 53.4494°N 1.9781°W

Dinting Vale is a village in Glossopdale, Derbyshire, England. The Vale falls within the Simmondley ward of the High Peak Council. Dinting Vale lies near to Higher Dinting, Dinting, Brookfield and Glossop.

Dinting Vale Printworks became renowned through the Potter family which included Edmund Potter and his brother Rupert Potter, the father of Beatrix Potter who often visited her father and uncle at the Print Works. The street names in a housing estate in nearby Brookfield carry the memory with Potter Road and Beatrix Drive.

== See also ==
- List of places in Derbyshire
