= Higher Dinting =

Village in Derbyshire, England

Coordinates: 53°27′24″N 1°58′41″W

Higher Dinting is a village in Glossopdale, Derbyshire, England. The village is near Glossop, Dinting, and Dinting Vale; the village falls within the Simmondley ward of the High Peak Council.

Higher Dinting was the site of the Dinting Railway Museum.

Nicholas Garlick was born in Higher Dinting in 1555 and was executed at Derby in July 1588 for being a Catholic priest. The Padley Martyrs are still commemorated every July at Padley Chapel near Grindleford. A memorial was placed in the vicarage garden in Higher Dinting.

== See also ==
- List of places in Derbyshire
