= Simmondley =

Village in Derbyshire, England

Coordinates: 53.435°N 1.973°W

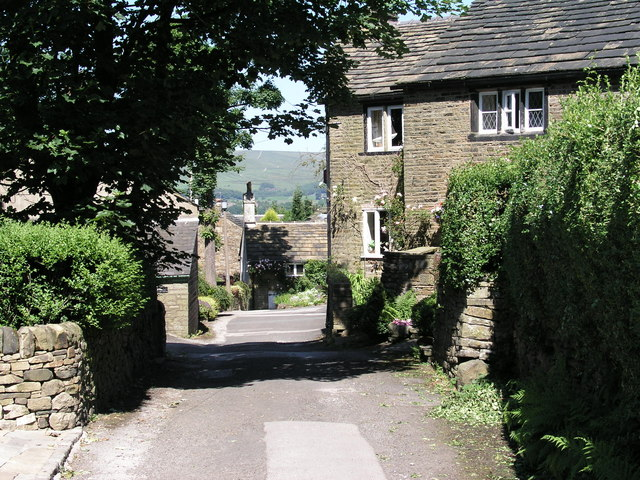
- Simmondley village off Old Lane

- Location within Derbyshire
- Population: 4,727 (Including Charlestown. Ward. 2011)
- OS grid reference: SK018931
- District: High Peak
- Shire county: Derbyshire
- Region: East Midlands
- Country: England
- Sovereign state: United Kingdom
- Post town: GLOSSOP
- Postcode district: SK13
- Police: Derbyshire
- Fire: Derbyshire
- Ambulance: North West

Simmondley is a small village near the town of Glossop in Derbyshire, England. The population of the High Peak ward at the 2011 Census was 4,727. It has one pub, the Hare and Hounds, in the south of the village at the top of Simmondley Lane. The pub is a part of the original farming community with the adjacent farmhouse, barn and stables converted into houses. The Jubilee pub was built in 1977, in celebration of the Silver Jubilee of Elizabeth II. After 40 years, the brewery that owned the Jubilee sold it at auction; the buyer demolished the building in 2017 to build houses on the site and adjoining car park.

There is a post office, a Chinese takeaway, a dentist, a doctor, a chemist a convenience store and a hairdressers.

Many large housing projects have recently been completed in Simmondley, including a large housing estate off Valley Road that stretches towards the existing Manchester rail line.

Simmondley has a number of public areas, including: a children's play park area with swings and a centre climbing frame; an enclosed floodlit games court called the S.M.U.G.A (Simmondley Multi Use Games Area) with football nets and basketball hoops; open grassland around the estate mainly surrounding the Werneth Road area; a village green to the top of Simmondley with a public phone box, post box, plant pots and seating (during the Christmas period this is the location of the Simmondley Christmas Tree).

The housing developments south of the village have led to it being considered by some as a suburb of Glossop, rather than a separate settlement as it is contiguous with Glossop, although in recent years the local council has installed Simmondley signs at accesses to the village to mark that it has its own separate identity.

Simmondley is at the bottom of the so-called Monks' Road, a road used by the monks of Basingwerk Abbey to administer the abbey's estate. It leads to Charlesworth, Chisworth and Hayfield.

== Schools and further education ==
=== Simmondley Pre-School ===
Simmondley pre-School was based over two sites. Natural Explorers (aged 2–4) occupied the old chapel on High Lane, in the original village part of Simmondley, until 2020, when the group moved to Simmondley Primary School. The second pre-school group is based in the grounds of Simmondley Primary School. This become the only group in 2020 with the closure of the High Lane site.

=== Simmondley Primary School ===
Simmondley Primary School has 295 pupils on the school roll, as of 2024. The school is on Pennine Road and was built in the 1970s by Derbyshire Education Authority using the CLASP (Consortium of Local Authorities Special Programme) design method, which was popular with councils for rapid builds between the 1950s and 1990s.

== Places of worship ==
=== Early years ===
The founder of Methodism, John Wesley, was a preacher renowned for his fondness of the Derbyshire area and is known to have preached to crowds of Simmondley residents, using the bridge in the Bridgefield area of Simmondley as an elevated platform to give his speech.

=== Zion Methodist Chapel ===
The Zion Methodists were an offshoot from Spring Street, Hollingsworth, and began Sunday School activities in a large room over at a Logwood Mill in Dinting Vale. The room in the mill could be used for all school purposes but not as a preaching place. Before the opening of the chapel, preaching services were held in cottages that were lent by friends of the offshoot group. The laying of the foundation stone took place in August 1860. The chapel was opened for divine worship in February 1861. In 1869 a large vestry was added, with a gallery over the top for an organ. Land for a school was secured in 1883, and it was finished by 1885. In 1888 a public elementary Day School was commenced. The local school, later run by Derbyshire County Council, closed in the 1970s, pupils moving to the new Simmondley Primary School on Pennine Road. The old school halls become a local community space that could be hired out; numerous groups such as Simmondley Youth Club and a mother and toddler group were based in the building. The chapel was in use until 2022, when it and the old school buildings were demolished for a new housing development.

=== Simmondley Chapel, High Lane ===
A chapel was opened in the higher end of the village in 1844. The chapel became a pre-school for infants, but closed in 2020 and students moved to the new building at Simmondley Primary School. Since the closure of the pre-school, a group has taken over the chapel to start a church group.

== Transport ==
=== Bus ===
Simmondley is served by a number of bus routes throughout the week.

=== Train ===
There have been calls in recent years for Simmondley to be jointly served by a train station in Gamesley. So far no plans have been submitted.

=== Roads ===
The A6016 road runs north of Simmondley from the A57 to the A624.

== See also ==
- Listed buildings in Simmondley
