= Hadfield, Derbyshire =

Town in Derbyshire, England

Coordinates: 53.46°N 1.97°W

Hadfield
- Town
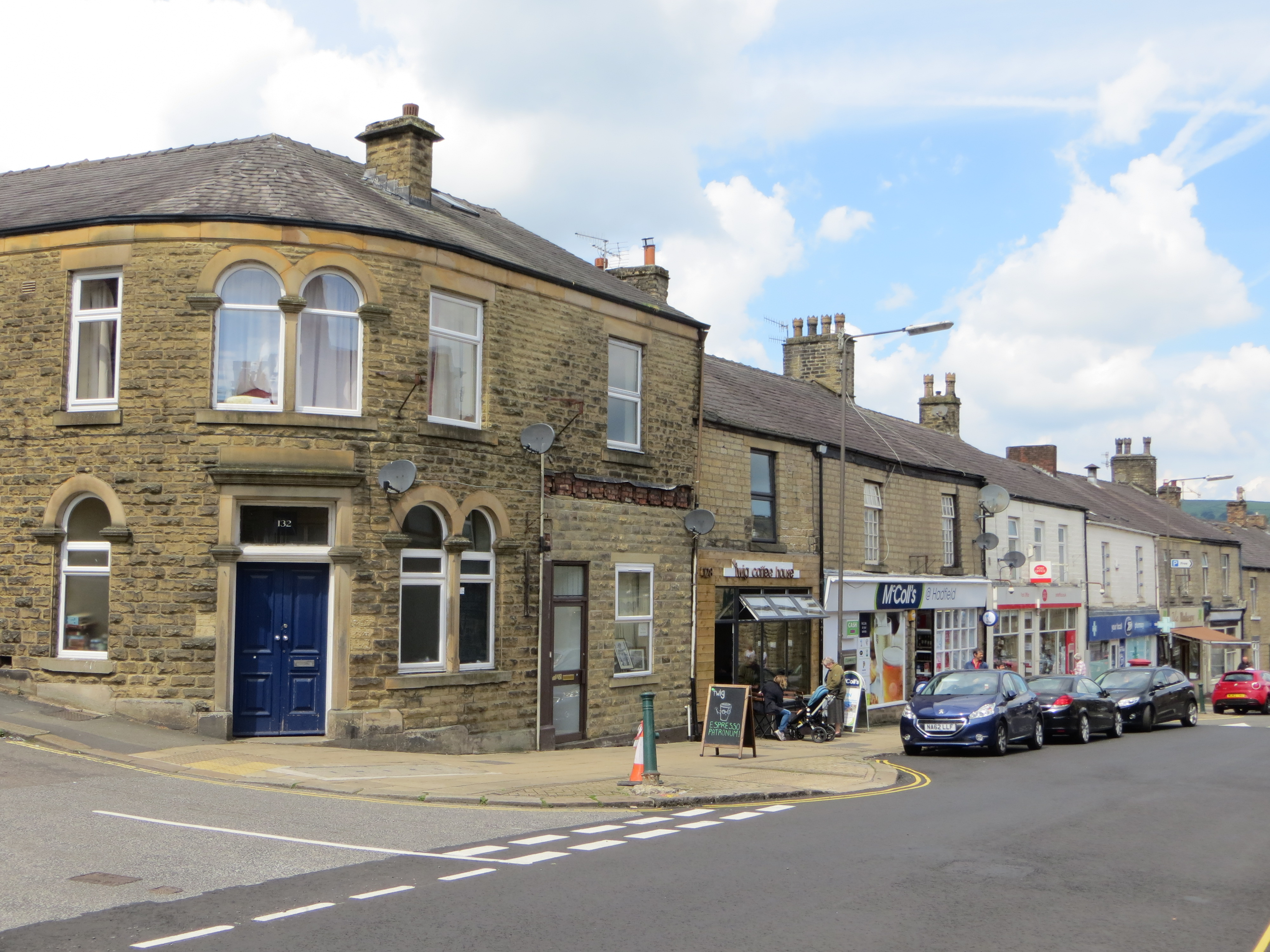
- Station Road

- Location within Derbyshire
- Population: 6,763 (2021 Census)
- OS grid reference: SK021963
- District: High Peak,
- Shire county: Derbyshire
- Region: East Midlands
- Country: England
- Sovereign state: United Kingdom
- Post town: GLOSSOP
- Postcode district: SK13
- Dialling code: 01457
- Police: Derbyshire
- Fire: Derbyshire
- Ambulance: North West
- UK Parliament: High Peak

Hadfield is a town in the High Peak of Derbyshire, England; it had a population of 6,763 at the 2021 Census. It lies on the south side of the River Etherow, near to the border with Greater Manchester, at the western edge of the Peak District and close to Glossop. Hadfield doubled as the fictional town of Royston Vasey in the BBC comedy series The League of Gentlemen.

== Geography ==
Hadfield is in the north-west of Derbyshire, between Bottoms Reservoir and the Glossop Brook, on the southern side of the River Etherow valley, which is known as Longdendale. The town lies between 394 and 690 feet (120 and 210 m) above sea level; it is 12 1/2 miles (20 km) from Manchester.

== History ==
Hadfield was part of the Manor of Glossop and, at the time of the Domesday Book in 1086, belonged to William the Conqueror. King Henry I granted the land to William Peveril. In 1157, King Henry II gave it to the Abbey of Basingwerk in North Wales. In 1537, King Henry VIII gave it to the Earl of Shrewsbury, from whom it came to the Howard family (Dukes of Norfolk). While the Howards were responsible in the 1810s for the development of Glossop, it was the Sidebottom family who developed Hadfield; they bought the Waterside and Bridge Mill complex from John Turner and John Thornley in 1820.

For three generations, they developed these mills as a large spinning and weaving combine. They built their own branch railway to the mill and, in 1880, ran 293,000 spindles and 4,800 looms. In 1896, the Sidebottoms went into liquidation. Bridge Mill was destroyed by fire in 1899, but Waterside Mill was bought by John Gartside and Co of Ashton-under-Lyne. Gartside's re-equipped the mills with automatic looms from the United States and installed new engines and electric lighting.

During the First World War, the mill was taken over by the Greenfield Mill Company but parts of the mill were used to produce munitions. After the war, the company declined. In 1940, the mill was occupied by Maconochie's Foodstuffs Ltd, which had been bombed out of its previous premises in London. By 1954, about half of the original building had been demolished and more was to go. In 1976, the site was redeveloped and renamed as the Hadfield Trading Estate.

Station Mill was built in 1834 by Thomas and Edward Platt, members of a family who had farmed Longdendale for generations. The family owned this cotton mill for 68 years, before selling it to E. Wilman & Sons in 1923, which converted it to silk noil spinning. The mill closed in 1989.

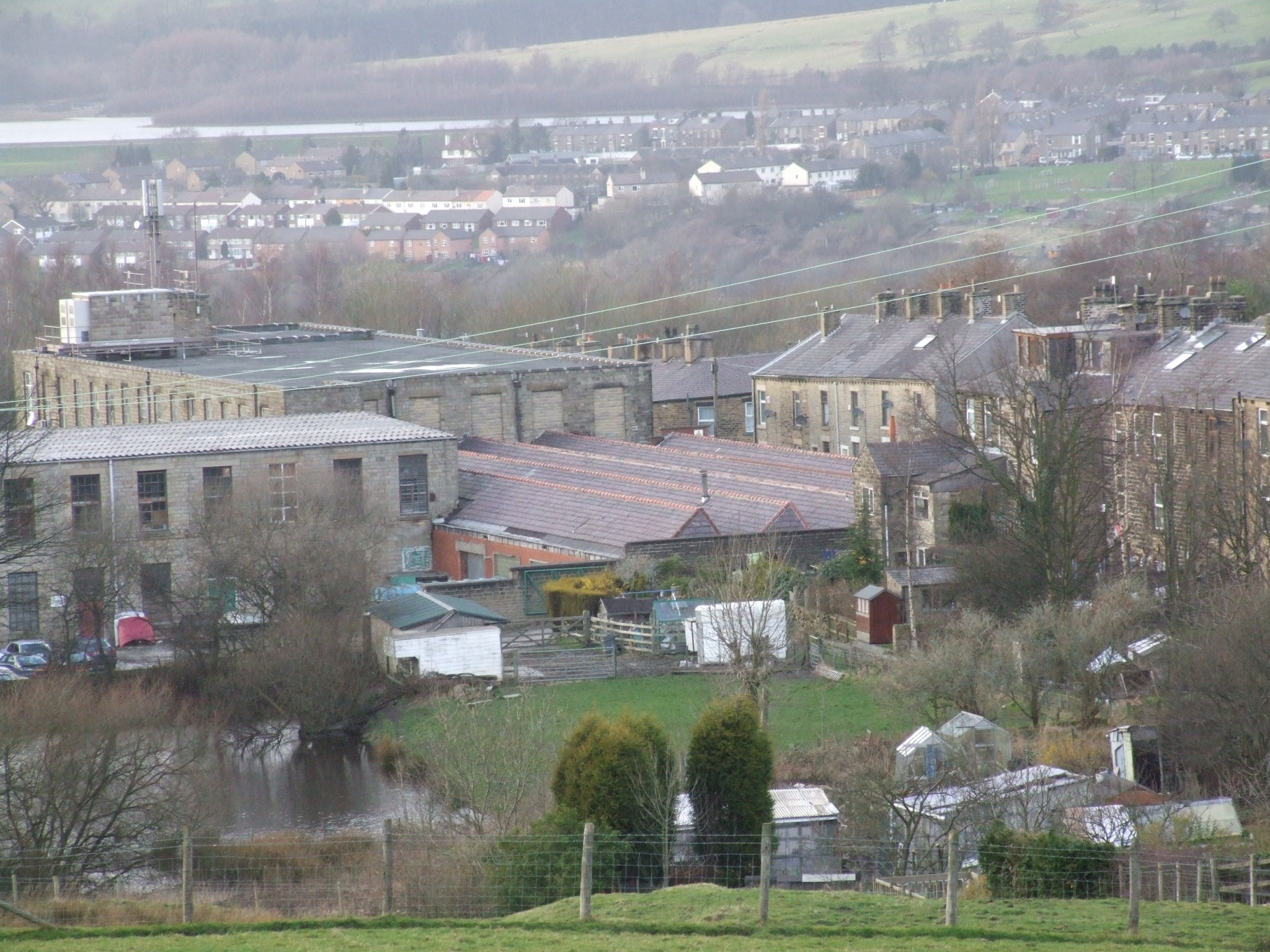
Hadfield Mills, Padfield

Hadfield Mills were corn mills from before 1819. In 1874, Thomas Rhodes and Sons converted the mills to the manufacture of cotton. A thousand workers were employed there in 1873, but it closed in 1932. In 1940, it was reopened by Hadfield Worsted Mills Ltd for cloth manufacture.

Hadfield and its mills were linked to Glossop via an electric tramway which operated between 1903 and 1927.

== Economy ==
Rowntree's bought the Sun-Pat business in June 1967, of Maconochie Foods. The production site now made Rowntree jellies, under the Grocery Division of Rowntree's, at the Millwall Works. Honey was moved to the site in April 1987. In 1998, Nestlé closed the plant at Peterhead, and production of Branston Pickle was moved to Hadfield. In May 2002, Premier Foods bought the Nestlé UK food business, which included the Hadfield site, and others in Middleton and Tallaght in Dublin. Production of Branston Pickle moved to Bury St Edmunds in 2004.

== Governance ==
Hadfield is administered by High Peak Borough Council at the Town/District/Borough level of Government and by Derbyshire County Council at county level.

Representation on Derbyshire County Council is split between the divisions of Glossop & Charlesworth and Etherow, with the majority of the town forming part of the latter. The Etherow division contains Hadfield North, Hadfield South, Gamesley and the large and sparsely populated Tintwistle ward. The Glossop and Charlesworth division contains, amongst others, the Padfield ward (which takes the northern side of Station Road, the main shopping street). These boundaries were set in 2013.

Division	Holder
Etherow	Cllr Dave Wilcox
Glossop and Charlesworth	Cllr Damien Greenhalgh; Cllr Ellie Wilcox

Representation on High Peak Borough Council

Ward	Holder
Hadfield North	Cllr Victoria Elizabeth Mann
Hadfield South	Cllr Edward Siddall
Hadfield South	Cllr Robert Joseph McKeown

Hadfield does not have a parish council.

The MP for the High Peak constituency is Jon Pearce, who represents the Labour Party. His majority in the 2024 general election was 412 over the Conservative candidate Robert Largan.

Constituency	Holder
High Peak	Jon Pearce

== Transport ==
Hadfield lies within close proximity of the county boundary with Greater Manchester and some services are provided with this in mind. Though lying within Derbyshire and the East Midlands, some of the town's transport facilities are managed by Transport for Greater Manchester.

=== Railway ===
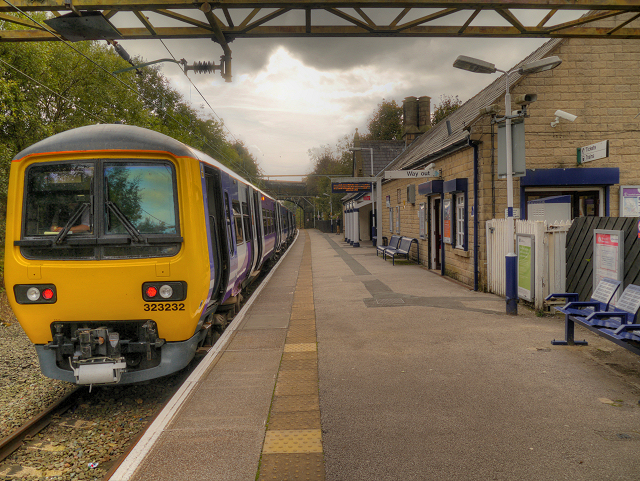
An electric multiple unit at Hadfield station

The town is served by Hadfield and Dinting railway stations, on the Glossop line. Hadfield is the eastern terminus, with most trains running first to Glossop and then reversing back through Dinting towards Manchester Piccadilly. Regular services are operated by Northern Trains.

The railway, formerly known as the Woodhead Line, used to run through to Penistone and Sheffield Victoria, via the Woodhead Tunnel, but passenger services were withdrawn in 1970. Goods trains ran until 1981, when Hadfield became the terminus. The track to the east was lifted subsequently and has now been adopted as part of the Longdendale Trail shared-use path.

=== Roads ===
The A57, which links Manchester to Sheffield via the Snake Pass, passes to the south of Hadfield, from Woolley Bridge to Dinting Vale. The A628 road, which connects Manchester to Barnsley and Sheffield over the Woodhead Pass, runs on the other side of the River Etherow through Hollingworth and Tintwistle.

These two roads are major freight routes and are often congested, which has created traffic problems both for Hadfield and its neighbouring towns and villages. The Mottram to Tintwistle by-pass is intended to relieve the congestion. Work finally began to build the by-pass in 2024 and it is scheduled to be completed by 2028.

=== Buses ===
Bus services in the area are operated by Stagecoach Manchester and High Peak Buses. The town is served by two main bus routes:

- 237, which runs twice per hour in each direction towards Glossop and Ashton-under-Lyne
- 393, which is an hourly circular route linking the town to Padfield, Glossop and Shirebrook Park.

== Media ==
Regional TV news comes from Salford-based BBC North West and ITV Granada. Television signals are received from the Winter Hill, and one of the two local relay transmitters (Glossop and Mottram In Longdendale).

Local radio stations are BBC Radio Manchester and Greatest Hits Radio Midlands (formerly High Peak Radio).

The local newspaper is the Glossop Advertiser, which is owned by Reach plc, the parent company of the Manchester Evening News.

=== Other media ===
The popular BBC television comedy series The League of Gentlemen was filmed in Hadfield, which doubled as the fictional town of Royston Vasey. In the film spin-off from the original series, The League of Gentlemen's Apocalypse, Hadfield appears as itself when the characters from the TV series enter into the real world through a supposed portal below a church. The statue featured in the series and film's opening credits is the war memorial, commemorating lives lost in the First and Second World Wars.

== Notable people ==
- Harold Wild (1891–1977), cricketer who played 32 first-class cricket matches for Derbyshire
- Francis Taylor, Baron Taylor of Hadfield (1905–1995), businessman who founded Taylor Woodrow, a contractor and developer
- Harold Rhodes (born 1936), cricketer who played 322 first-class cricket matches and two Test matches for England
- Dame Hilary Mantel (1952–2022), writer whose work includes historical fiction, personal memoirs and short stories, brought up locally
- Jasmin Paris (born 1983), runner who has been a national fell running champion, lived locally.

== See also ==
- Listed buildings in Hadfield, Derbyshire
