= Listed buildings in Simmondley =

Simmondley is a village in the High Peak district of Derbyshire, England. The village contains seven listed buildings that are recorded in the National Heritage List for England. All the listed buildings are designated at Grade II, the lowest of the three grades, which is applied to "buildings of national importance and special interest". The listed buildings are all houses or farmhouses, and are located near the centre of the village.

== Buildings ==
Name and location	Photograph	Date	Notes
Simmondley Hall; 53.43684°N 1.96846°W	—	Early 17th century	A farmhouse and outbuildings combined into two houses, in millstone grit, partly rendered, with quoins, and a stone slate roof with coped gables and kneelers. There are two storeys, and an irregular plan, with a front of two bays, the left bay gabled, with a projecting gabled two-storey porch on the right containing a doorway with a chamfered surround. The windows are mullioned, those in the ground floor with six and eight lights, and all have Tudor hood moulds.
Dingle Cottage; 53.43526°N 1.96948°W	—	1706	A millstone grit house with quoins and a stone slate roof. There are two storeys and an irregular front, with a single-story extension on the right, and a two-storey addition beyond. The doorway has a chamfered surround, a four-centred arch, and a dated and initialled lintel. Some of the windows have single lights, and the others are mullioned.
Hanover Cottage and The Homestead; 53.43605°N 1.96858°W	—	1719	A house and a cottage in millstone grit with stone slate roofs, and two storeys. The house has two bays, and contains a doorway with a chamfered surround and an inscribed and dated lintel. The windows are mullioned, and contain casements. The cottage, slightly recessed on the left, has a single bay, and contains a doorway with a flush surround, a bow window to the left, and a casement window above.
49 and 50 Simmondley New Road; 53.43680°N 1.96800°W	—	Mid-18th century	A farmhouse, later a pair of houses, in millstone grit, partly rendered, with quoins and a stone slate roof. There are two storeys and an attic, and three bays. The windows are casements, some with mullions, and on the right return is a gabled porch.
Rose Cottage; 53.43594°N 1.96857°W	—	Late 18th century	Two houses later combined into one, it is in millstone grit, partly rendered, with a stone slate roof. There are two storeys and an attic, a front of three bays, and a lean-to on the right. On the front is a gabled porch, some of the windows have single lights, the others are mullioned, and in the attic is a gabled two-light dormer.
The Weavings; 53.43660°N 1.96857°W	—	Late 18th century	A loom shop, later a private house, in millstone grit, partly rendered, with a stone slate roof. There is a block with three storeys and an attic and two bays, and to the east is a two-storey extension with a catslide roof. On the front facing the street is a gabled porch, most of the windows are mullioned with three lights, and in the return is a former taking-in door.
Alma House, walls and railings 53.43606°N 1.96831°W	—	Early 19th century	The house, which incorporates earlier fragments, is in millstone grit, and has an overhanging stone slate roof. There are two storeys and attics, and three bays. The doorway has a flush surround, and the windows are a mix of sashes and casements. At the front of the garden is a low wall with railings, gates and gate piers with bow-curved tops.
