= Dinting =

Village in Derbyshire, United Kingdom

Coordinates: 53°27′N 1°58′W

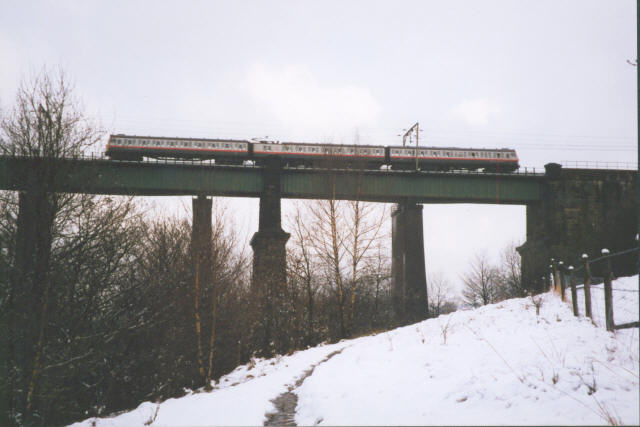
Dinting railway viaduct in 1994

Dinting is a village in the High Peak district of Derbyshire, England. It is situated near the towns of Glossop and Hadfield. There is a small primary school, Dinting C of E, located near the viaduct. The 1st Dinting Scout Group has been active since 1938.

== Transport ==
The village is served by Dinting railway station, on the Glossop Line between Glossop, Hadfield and Manchester Piccadilly. The station has a generally half-hourly service in both directions.

It is notable for the Dinting Arches, a viaduct which carries the railway over Glossop Brook.

The Dinting Railway Centre was run by the Bahamas Locomotive Society until it closed in 1991, due to leasing difficulties. The museum moved to Ingrow (West) station, alongside the line at the Keighley and Worth Valley Railway. .

== Notable residents ==
- Blessed Nicholas Garlick, Catholic priest and martyr, was born here c. 1555.

== See also ==
- Listed buildings in Glossop
