= Listed buildings in Charlesworth, Derbyshire =

Charlesworth is a civil parish in the High Peak district of Derbyshire, England. The parish contains 15 listed buildings that are recorded in the National Heritage List for England. All the listed buildings are designated at Grade II, the lowest of the three grades, which is applied to "buildings of national importance and special interest". The parish contains the village of Charlesworth and the surrounding countryside. Most of the listed buildings are houses and cottages, farmhouses and farm buildings. The other listed buildings are a bridge, a church, a chapel and its associated walls, and a war memorial.

== Buildings ==
Name and location	Photograph	Date	Notes
Herod Farmhouse; 53.42817°N 1.95925°W		Early 17th century	The farmhouse is in gritstone with quoins and a stone slate roof. There are two storeys, three bays, and a rear outshut. The doorway has a chamfered surround, massive quoins, and an initialled and dated lintel. The windows were mullioned, some with hood moulds, but the mullions have been removed. There is a single-light window with a round-arched head, and concave moulding with three ball motifs.
Rivendell Farmhouse and cottage 53.43506°N 2.01692°W	—	17th century	The farmhouse and attached cottage are in gritstone with a stone slate roof. There are two storeys and five bays. The windows are mullioned, and inside there are two timber framed partitions.
Horseshoe Farmhouse and barn 53.42322°N 1.95003°W	—	17th century	The farmhouse, which has been altered, is in gritstone, mainly rendered, with a stone slate roof. It has two storeys, a main range, and a cross-wing to the south. There are two doorways with plain surrounds, and most of the windows are mullioned. The barn is attached to the north.
Broadbottom Bridge; 53.44056°N 2.00653°W		1683	The bridge, which has been rebuilt, carries a road over the River Etherow. It is in stone and consists of a single segmental arch with a span of 70 feet (21 m). The parapet has chamfered coping stones.
White House; 53.42247°N 1.94982°W		1669	The house is in gritstone with a stone slate roof and two storeys. It consists of a main range of two bays, and a projecting gabled cross-wing on the left. In the angle is a two-storey porch with a coped gable and moulded kneelers. The doorway has a quoined surround and a massive Tudor arched lintel, and above it is a single-light round-arched window. The other windows either have a single light or are mullioned.
Town Lane Farmhouse; 53.43289°N 1.98918°W	—	1719	The farmhouse is in gritstone, with quoins, and a stone slate roof with coped gables and moulded kneelers. There are two storeys and three bays. The doorway has a chamfered surround and an initialled and dated lintels, and the windows are mullioned.
46 and 48 Town Lane; 53.43306°N 1.98777°W	—	18th century	A pair of gritstone cottages with a stone slate roof and three storeys. On the north front are two doorways, and windows, some mullioned, and some with replacement sashes.
Pinfold; 53.43265°N 1.99078°W	—	18th century	A gritstone house with a stone slate roof, two storeys and three bays. The right bay projects and contains mullioned windows, and to the left are two bays and windows with the mullions removed.
Plainsteads Farmhouse and outbuildings 53.41613°N 1.96410°W		18th century	The farmhouse is in gritstone with a stone slate roof. There are two storeys, and the single-story outbuildings are to the east and wrap round the south side. The windows are mullioned.
Barn south of Shepley Farmhouse; 53.42236°N 1.95017°W		18th century	The barn is in gritstone with a stone slate roof. The openings in the north front are irregular and include a cart entrance with a quoined surround. Inside there is a cruck truss and an upper cruck truss.
Independent Chapel; 53.43149°N 1.98554°W		1797	The chapel is in gritstone, with quoins, a string course, a stone slate roof, and two storeys. The north front is gabled with three bays. In the middle bay, each floor has a central Venetian window, flanked in the ground floor by doorways, and in the upper floor by cross windows. Above the upper central window is a dated and initialled plaque, and along the sides of the chapel are rectangular cross windows.
Walls, Independent Chapel; 53.43182°N 1.98533°W	—	19th century	Enclosing he graveyard of the chapel are dry stone retaining walls. The walls have rounded coping stones.
Church of St John the Evangelist; 53.43282°N 1.99502°W		1846–49	The church is in gritstone with a slate roof. It has a cruciform plan, consisting of a nave, a north porch, a south transept, a chancel with an apse and a south vestry, and a north tower. The tower has angle buttresses, a three-light west window, a northeast polygonal stair turret, and a plain parapet.
War memorial 53.43300°N 1.99288°W		1920	The war memorial, which stands in the centre of a road junction, is in stone. It is in the form of a truncated tapered obelisk, on a deep plinth. The plinth carries inscriptions, and on the obelisk are the names of those lost in the two World Wars.
