= Listed buildings in Hadfield, Derbyshire =

Hadfield is a town in the High Peak district of Derbyshire, England. The town contains eight listed buildings that are recorded in the National Heritage List for England. All the listed buildings are designated at Grade II, the lowest of the three grades, which is applied to "buildings of national importance and special interest". The listed buildings consist of houses, a public house and a church, and, apart from the church, they are located near the centre of the town.

== Buildings ==
Name and location	Photograph	Date	Notes
Old Hall; 53.46216°N 1.97002°W		1646	The house, which was later extended to the rear, is in millstone grit on a plinth, with quoins, and a stone slate roof with coped gables and kneelers. There are two storeys, a front of three bays, and a rear wing. The doorway has a chamfered surround, a four-centred arch, a massive inscribed and dated lintel, and a Tudor hood mould. The windows are mullioned, one with five lights, and those in the ground floor with Tudor hood moulds.
78 and 78A Hadfield Road; 53.46078°N 1.97143°W		Late 17th century	A house later divided into two, it is in millstone grit and has a stone slate roof. There are two storeys, a single-depth plan, a front of three bays, and a rear cross-wing. On the front are two doorways, the doorway on the right with a porch that has a shaped gable, and the windows are mullioned.
80, 82 and 84 Hadfield Road; 53.46069°N 1.97159°W	—	1744	Two cottages with a barn to the left, converted into three dwellings. They are in rendered millstone grit with a stone slate roof. There are two storeys and four bays. The former cottages have mullioned windows, and in the former barn are inserted windows.
66 and 68 Hadfield Road; 53.46109°N 1.97102°W	—	Late 18th century	A pair of houses in millstone grit with a stone slate roof. There are three storeys, and a mirror image front, each house with one bay. The doorways are paired in the centre, and have massive surrounds. The windows are mullioned with three lights, and some mullions have been replaced by casement windows.
5 and 7 The Cross; 53.46163°N 1.97032°W	—	Late 18th century	A house, later divided, in millstone grit on a rusticated plinth, with rusticated quoins, a floor band and sill band, a moulded cornice, a parapet, and a roof of stone slate and tile with coped gables. There are two storeys and six bays. In the right house are paired doorways with moulded surrounds and a continuous flat hood, one with a fanlight, the other blocked. In the left return is a gabled porch, and the windows are casements.
The Spinner's Arms Public House; 53.46056°N 1.97088°W		Late 18th century	A laithe house later converted into a public house, it is in millstone grit and has a stone slate roof. There are two storeys, four bays, and a rear extension. On the front are two doorways, and the windows are sashes.
46 Hadfield Road; 53.46149°N 1.96988°W	—	1776	The house is in millstone grit, rendered on the left, on a plinth, with quoins, and a stone slate roof. There are two storeys, an attic and a basement, a double depth plan, a front of two bays, and single-storey extensions on the left. The doorway has a rectangular fanlight, and a dated and inscribed lintel. The windows are casements, and in the basement is a two-light mullioned window.
Church of St Charles Borromeo and Presbytery; 53.46252°N 1.97711°W		1858	Alterations were made to the church in 1888, and a chapel was added in 1940. The church is in millstone grit with a Welsh slate roof, and consists of a nave with a clerestory, north and south aisles, a north porch, a chancel with an apse and north and south chapels, and a southwest tower. The tower has three stages, a polygonal stair turret to the southwest, a west doorway with a moulded surround and a pointed arch, two-light pointed bell openings, and a parapet. Attached to the southeast is a presbytery, linked by a covered walkway. This has double gables, a wing, a porch, and mullioned and transomed windows.
