= Basingwerk Abbey =

Ruin of an abbey near Holywell, Flintshire, Wales

Coordinates: 53°17′17″N 3°12′29″W

- Abaty Dinas Basing
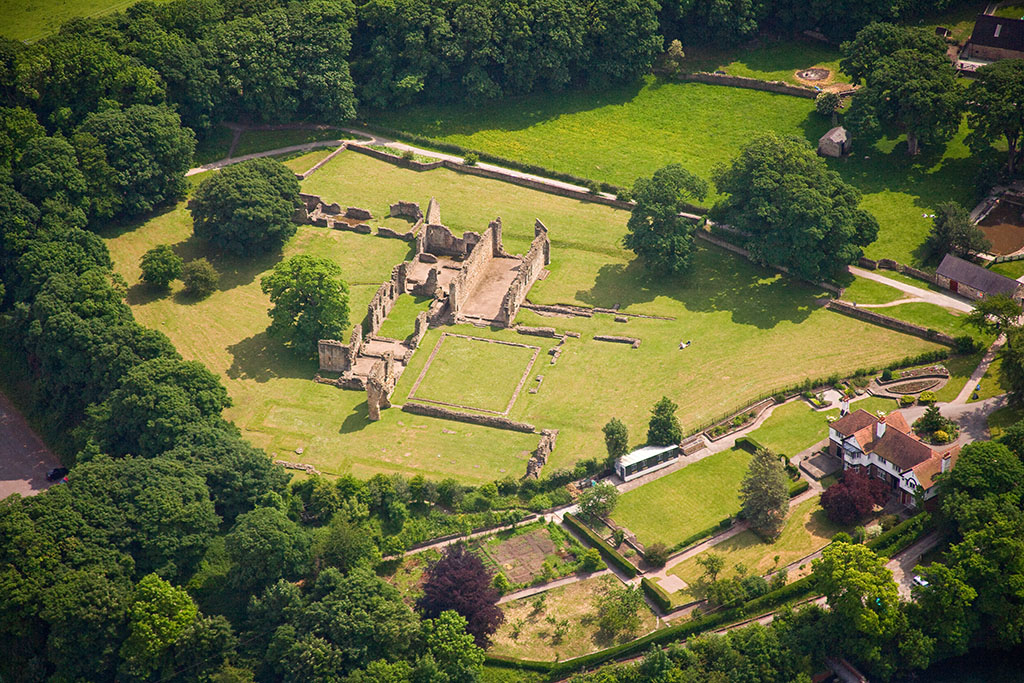
- Remains of Basingwerk Abbey

Religion
- Affiliation: Catholicism, Cistercians
- Ecclesiastical or organisational status: ruins
- Year consecrated: 1132

Location
- Location: Holywell, Flintshire, Wales
- Interactive map of Basingwerk Abbey

Architecture
- Type: Monastery
- Style: Cistercian

Basingwerk Abbey (Welsh: Abaty Dinas Basing) is a Grade I listed ruined abbey near Holywell, Flintshire, Wales. The abbey, which was founded in the 12th century, belonged to the Order of Cistercians. It maintained significant lands in the English county of Derbyshire. The abbey was abandoned and its assets sold following the Dissolution of the Monasteries in 1536.

The site is now managed by Cadw – the national Welsh heritage agency.

== Medieval history ==
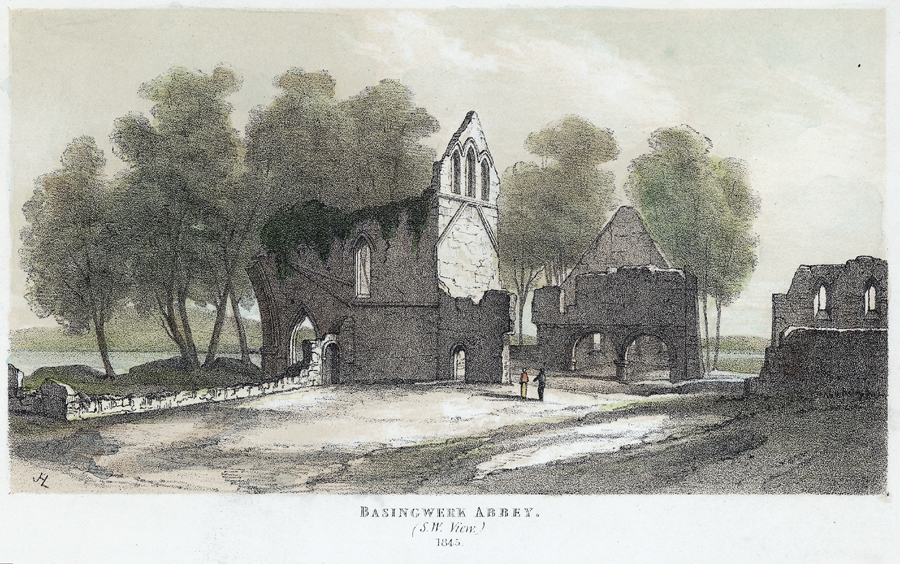
Basingwerk Abbey (1845) from the southwest

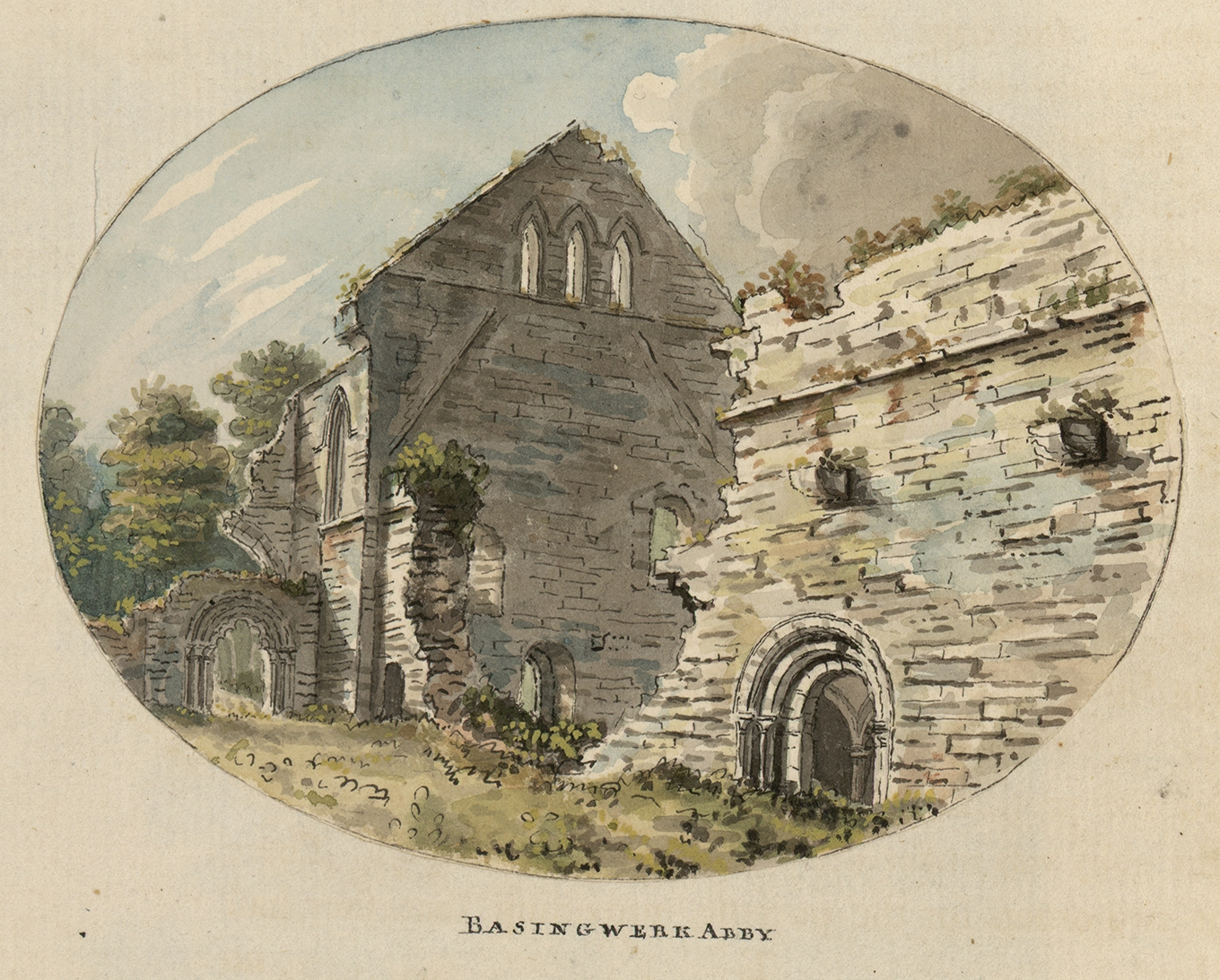
Basingwerk Abbey. A miniature by Moses Griffiths, c.1778

The abbey was founded in 1132 by Ranulf de Gernon, 4th Earl of Chester, who had already brought Benedictine monks from Savigny Abbey in southern Normandy. Likely the first location of the abbey was not at the current location at Greenfields but at the nearby Hen Blas. The abbey became part of the Cistercian Order in 1147, when the Savignac Order merged with the Cistercians. It was a daughter house of Combermere Abbey in Cheshire, of which Earl Ranulf was a great benefactor. However, in 1147 the abbot and convent of Savigny transferred it to Buildwas Abbey in Shropshire. Twenty years later, the monks of Basingwerk challenged their subjection to Buildwas, but Savigny found against them and sent a letter notifying their decision to the abbot of Cîteaux, the head of the Cistercian order. An Earl of Chester gave the manor of West Kirby to the Abbey.

In 1157, Owain Gwynedd encamped his army at Basingwerk, though at the Hen Blas site not at the current site, before facing the forces of Henry II at the Battle of Ewloe. The Welsh Prince stopped at the abbey because of its strategic importance. It blocked the route Henry II had to take to reach Twthill, Rhuddlan. In the fighting that followed, Owain Gwynedd split his army routing the English near Ewloe.

The abbey had significant lands in the English county of Derbyshire. Henry II gave the monks a manor near Glossop. The Monks' Road and the Abbot's Chair near the town are a reminder of the Abbey's efforts to administer their possession. In 1290 the Abbey gained a market charter for Glossop. The monks also got another charter for nearby Charlesworth in 1328.

By the 13th century, the abbey was under the patronage of Llywelyn the Great, Prince of Gwynedd. His son Dafydd ap Llywelyn gave St Winefride's Well to the abbey. The monks harnessed the power of the Holywell stream to run a corn mill and to treat the wool from their sheep. The monks sided with the English in Edward I's late 13th century conquest of Wales, for which they were rewarded with permission to hold a market and fair at Holywell. In 1433, the monks leased all of Glossopdale in Derbyshire to the Talbot family, the future Earls of Shrewsbury (1442). The increasing worldliness of the abbey by this time can be seen in the rebuilding of the domestic buildings to make them more comfortable, and in the abbot's patronage of bards like Tudor Aled. There was also some laxity in the religious observance – the last abbot, Nicholas Pennant, was the son of his predecessor Thomas.

A legend says a 12th-century Basingwerk Abbey monk was lured into a nearby wood by the singing of a nightingale. He thought he had only been listening a short while, but when he returned, the abbey was in ruins. He crumbled to dust shortly afterwards.

At the Valor Ecclestiasticus survey of 1535, Basingwerk was assessed at £150, putting it among the smaller houses that were earmarked for closure. By this time the number of monks had probably dwindled to two or three. In 1536, abbey life came to an end with the Dissolution of the Monasteries during the reign of Henry VIII. Its dissolution was made lawful by the Dissolution of the Lesser Monasteries Act and the lands of the abbey were granted to lay owners, with the site itself passing to Henry ap Harry of Llanasa. The abbot received a pension of £17 per annum.

Two centuries earlier a Welsh seer, Robin Ddu ("Robin the Dark"), said the roof on the refectory would go to a church under Moel Famau. It did: when the abbey was sold, the parts of the roof went to St Mary's Church in Cilcain below the slopes of Moel Famau. Another section of roof was reportedly given to the Collegiate and Parochial Church of St Peter at Ruthin, where it still covers the North Nave. Its Jesse window went to the Church of St Dyfnog at Llanrhaeadr-yng-Nghinmeirch. The choir stalls went to St Mary on the Hill, Chester, and some of the roofing lead was used to repair Holt Castle, as well as several royal castles in Ireland.

== Present day ==
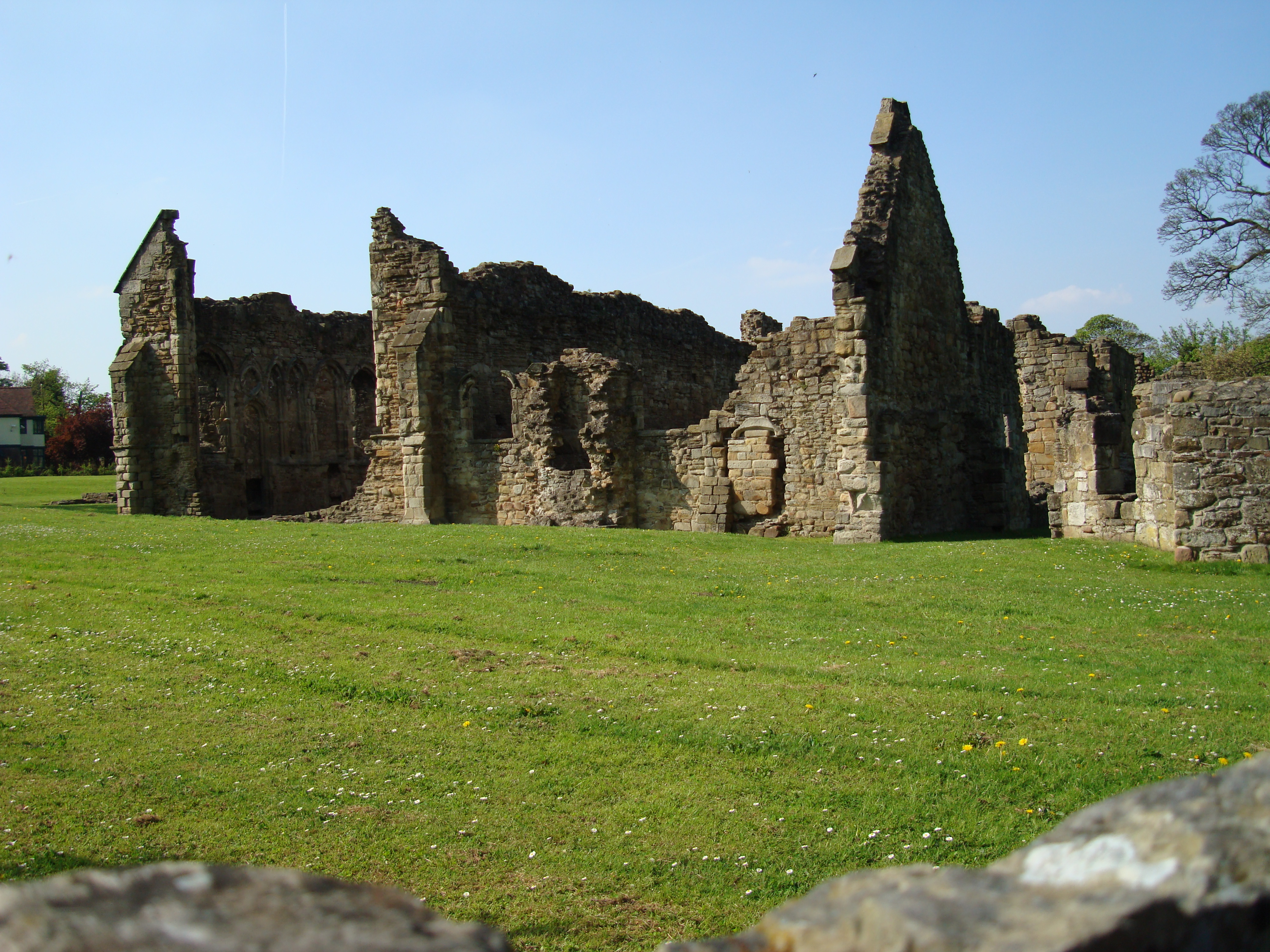

Since 1923, the remains of the abbey have been in state care. The ruins are part of Greenfield Valley Heritage Park, and are managed by Cadw. In common with most medieval monasteries, the abbey buildings were centred on a large church, with the domestic buildings of the monks in three ranges surrounding a cloister to its south. The majority of the buildings, including the church, were erected in the 13th century. The 50m long cruciform church has been reduced to foundations and low walls except for the south transept, where the west walls still stands high with one high window and the arch that led to the south aisle. Of the buildings round the cloister more remains, as they were converted to a house after the Dissolution. Immediately south of the church is the sacristy, then the chapter house. This is a 12th century room, to which a vaulted eastern section was added, divided by an arcade of two round arches which still stands. Around the walls is the bench on which the monks sat for chapter meetings. To the south is the dormitory undercroft, and to the south of that a warming room was added in the mid-13th century. This end of the range was heavily rebuilt in the later middle ages, with the vault being removed and a new hall and chamber built. Over this range stood the monks' dormitory, of which part of the side walls still stand, with lancet windows. Extending east from the south end of this range is another range of uncertain date, possibly incorporating the infirmary or abbot's house. In the south range are the staircase up to the dormitory, and the refectory. In the normal Cistercian manner, this is aligned north-south, perpendicular to the body of the range. It was a high-quality chamber, and elaborate lancets with Early English shafting survive in the west wall, along with the reader's pulpit and the hatch to the kitchen. Of the kitchen, and the entire west range, virtually nothing survives. The latter was separated from the cloister proper by a 'lane', as can be better seen at the Cistercian houses of Buildwas and Byland.

The abbey marks the starting point of the North Wales Pilgrims Way.

== See also ==
- List of monastic houses in Wales
- List of Cadw properties
- The Form of Preaching, a 14th-century style book or manual about a preaching style
- Holywell Junction railway station
