= Glossopdale =

Coordinates: 53°26′18″N 1°56′56″W

Glossopdale is the area around Glossop, Derbyshire, England, the valley of the Glossop Brook.

It includes Glossop, Hadfield, Charlesworth, Dinting, Dinting Vale, Higher Dinting, Padfield, Old Glossop, Whitfield and Gamesley

== See also ==
- List of places in Derbyshire
