= Dinting railway station =

Railway station in Derbyshire, England

Coordinates: 53.449°N 1.970°W

Dinting
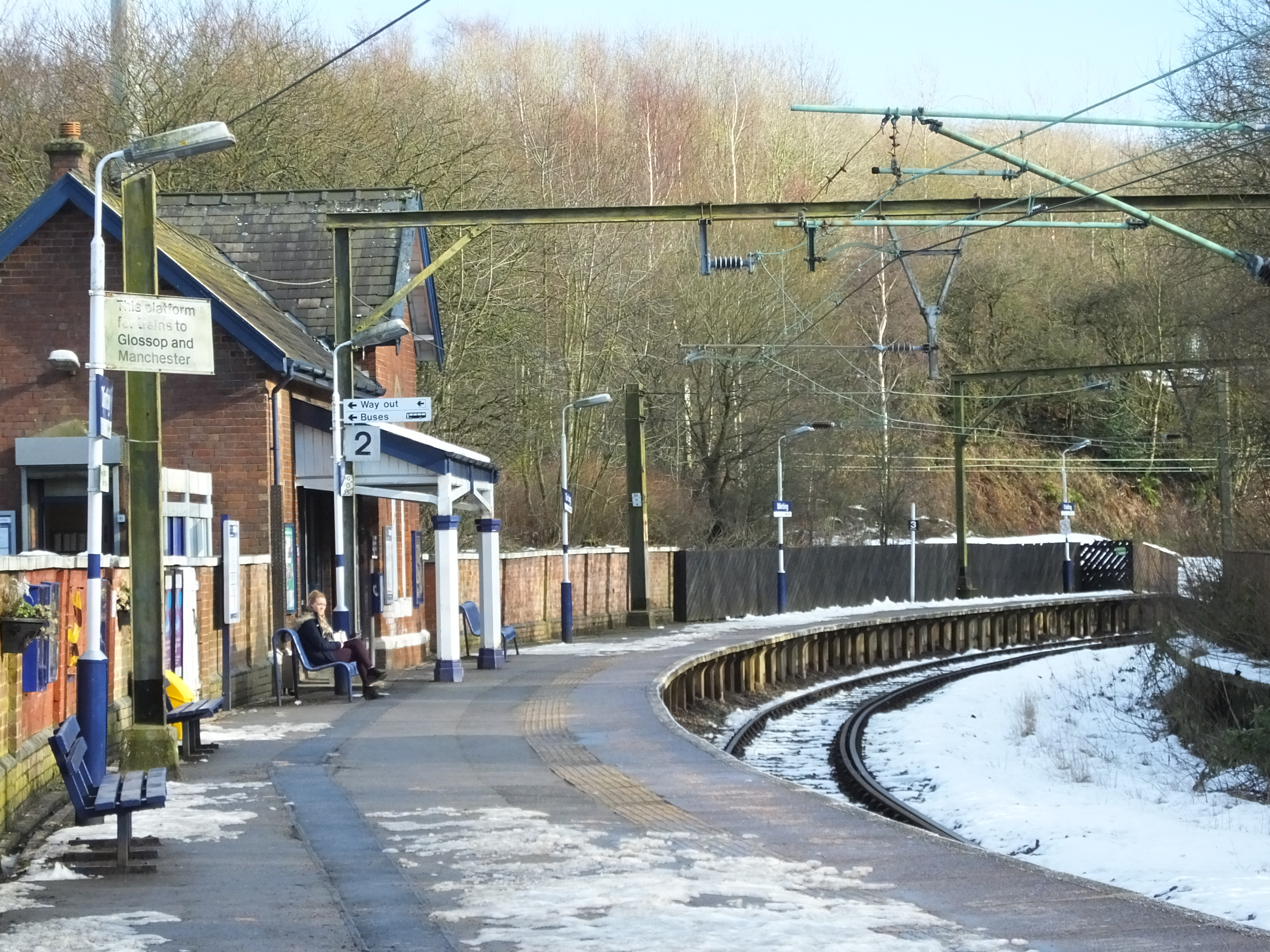
- The Glossop-bound platform

General information
- Location: Dinting, High Peak; England
- Grid reference: SK020947
- Manager: Northern Trains
- Transit authority: Transport for Greater Manchester
- Platforms: 2

Other information
- Station code: DTG
- Classification: DfT category E

Passengers
- 2020/21: ▼42,068
- 2021/22: ▲87,472
- 2022/23: ▼80,122
- 2023/24: ▲88,164
- 2024/25: ▼87,032
Location
Notes
- Passenger statistics from the Office of Rail and Road

Dinting railway station serves the village of Dinting in Derbyshire, England. It is a stop on the Glossop line and, prior to the Woodhead Line's closure in 1981, Dinting was a station on the Great Central Main Line between Manchester Piccadilly and Sheffield Victoria.

== History ==
An earlier station had been opened as Glossop by the Sheffield, Ashton-under-Lyne and Manchester Railway in 1842, but was renamed when the Glossop branch opened in 1845. In 1847, a temporary Glossop Junction station was built, on the site which the present station was built in 1848. A direct west-to-south curve was added in 1884, when the station was rebuilt, allowing through running from Glossop to Manchester.

For most of the day, all trains use platform 2; however, in the rush hour, platform 1 is the departure platform for services to Glossop via Hadfield, with platform 2 being used for trains to Manchester Piccadilly (although this can reverse with trains to Hadfield via Glossop departing from platform 2 and Manchester Piccadilly services using platform 1). Two further platforms survive, but both are out of use and fenced off; these are the old eastbound mainline platform towards Hadfield and that formerly used by Manchester-bound trains on the Glossop branch. Buildings still stand on each one, though neither is now in rail use. There are also buildings on platform 1 and a signal box that controls the triangular junction and single lines to both termini.

Immediately adjacent to the station is the Dinting viaduct, where three people were killed in an accident in September 1855. Another accident south of the station, in 1906 on the Glossop branch, resulted in 20 passengers and three members of train crew being injured when two trains were involved in a rear-end collision. A derailment of a freight train took place along the then eastbound Hadfield platform on 10 March 1981, shortly before the Woodhead's closure, destroying much of its original structure.

Dinting is considered to be part of the Transport for Greater Manchester rail network, being only a short distance from the administrative boundary; the same is true for Glossop and Hadfield stations. This means that ticketings, such as rail rangers, season tickets and integrated multi-mode ticketing, is the same as Greater Manchester rather than Derbyshire. Derbyshire County Council's Derbyshire Wayfarer ticket is not valid on trains on the Glossop line; however, it can be used on buses in the area.

In the 1990s and early 2000s, a new railway station was proposed a short distance down the line across the viaduct at Gamesley, with funding in place at one point for the project to go forward after a feasibility study; however, such plans have yet to come to fruition.

== Facilities ==
The station is staffed part-time (6:30 am to 1:00 pm, weekdays only), with the ticket office on platform 2. Outside the times listed, tickets must be purchased prior to travel or on the train. There is a shelter on this platform, whilst canopies on the buildings on platform 1 offer a covered waiting area when this platform is in use. Level access is available to both platforms from the car park and station entrance. Train running information is offered via automated announcements, timetable posters and digital CIS displays.

== Services ==
There is generally a half-hourly daytime service to Manchester Piccadilly and Hadfield, via Glossop. Some peak journeys go directly to and from Hadfield along the north side of the triangle, in order to allow a more frequent service to operate with the same number of train sets.

Early morning, rush hour and late evening services start and terminate at Glossop.

Trains operate hourly in the evenings in each direction.

Preceding station	National Rail	Following station
Broadbottom	Northern Trains Glossop Line	Hadfield
Broadbottom	Northern Trains Glossop Line	Glossop

== Dinting Railway Centre ==
The Dinting Railway Centre was based at Dinting station. Formed by the Bahamas Locomotive Society, the museum used to feature visits by such famous railway engines as Flying Scotsman, Mallard, Blue Peter and surviving members of the LMS Jubilee Class. It was closed in 1991; the society and its collection are now based at Ingrow West railway station near Keighley, West Yorkshire.

== Gallery ==
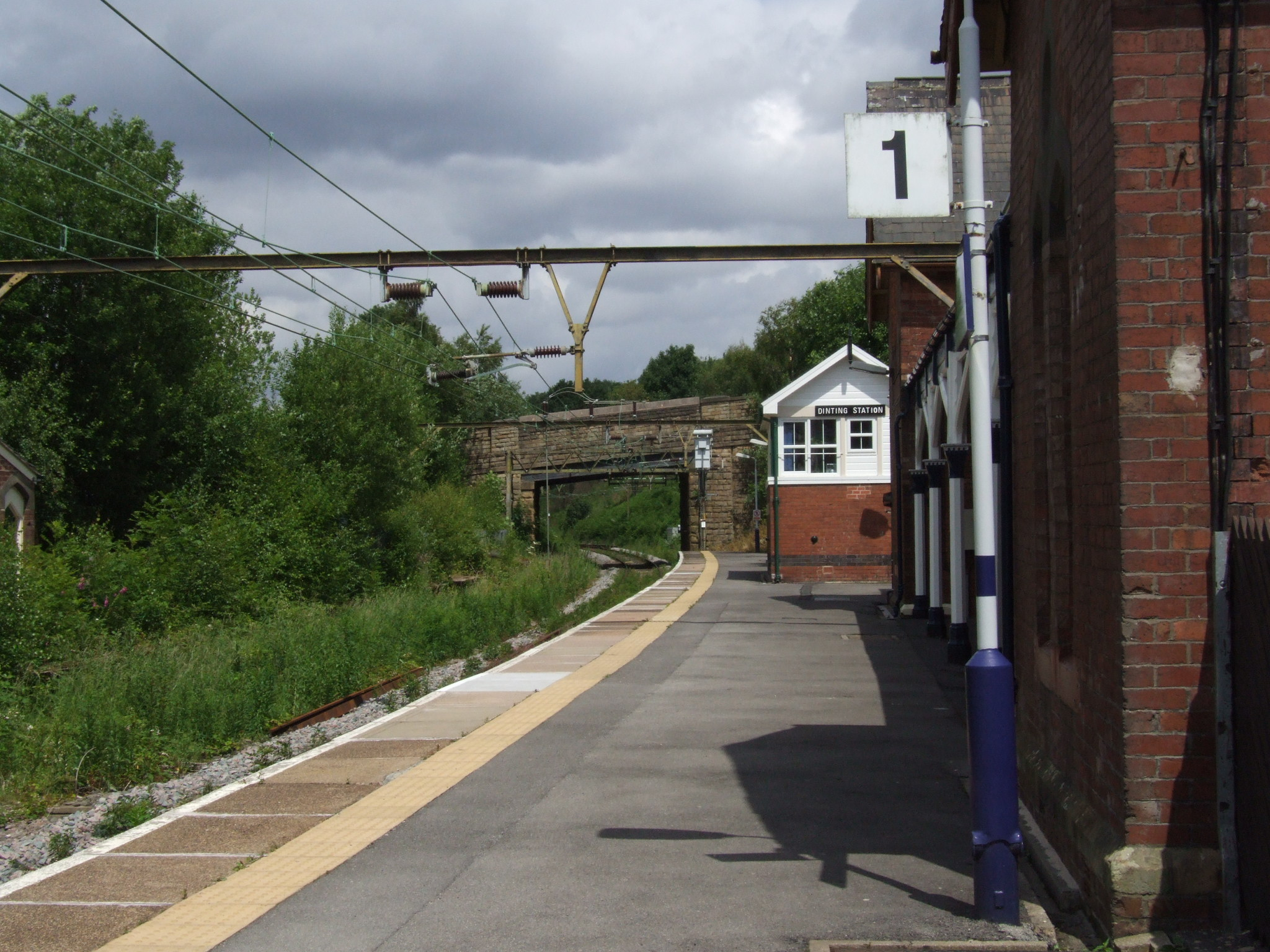
Platform 1 : Hadfield and Manchester

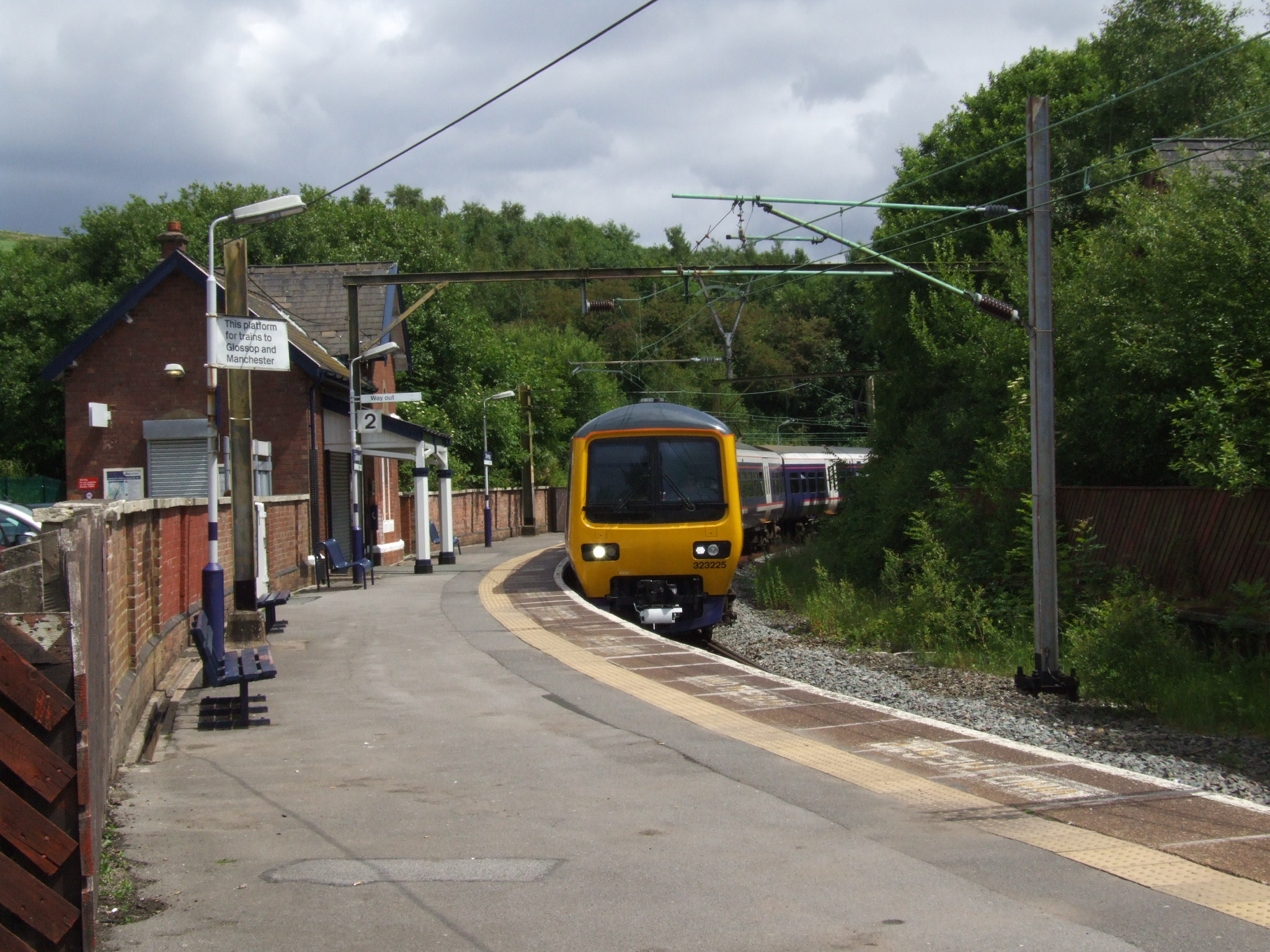
Platform 2 : Glossop and Manchester

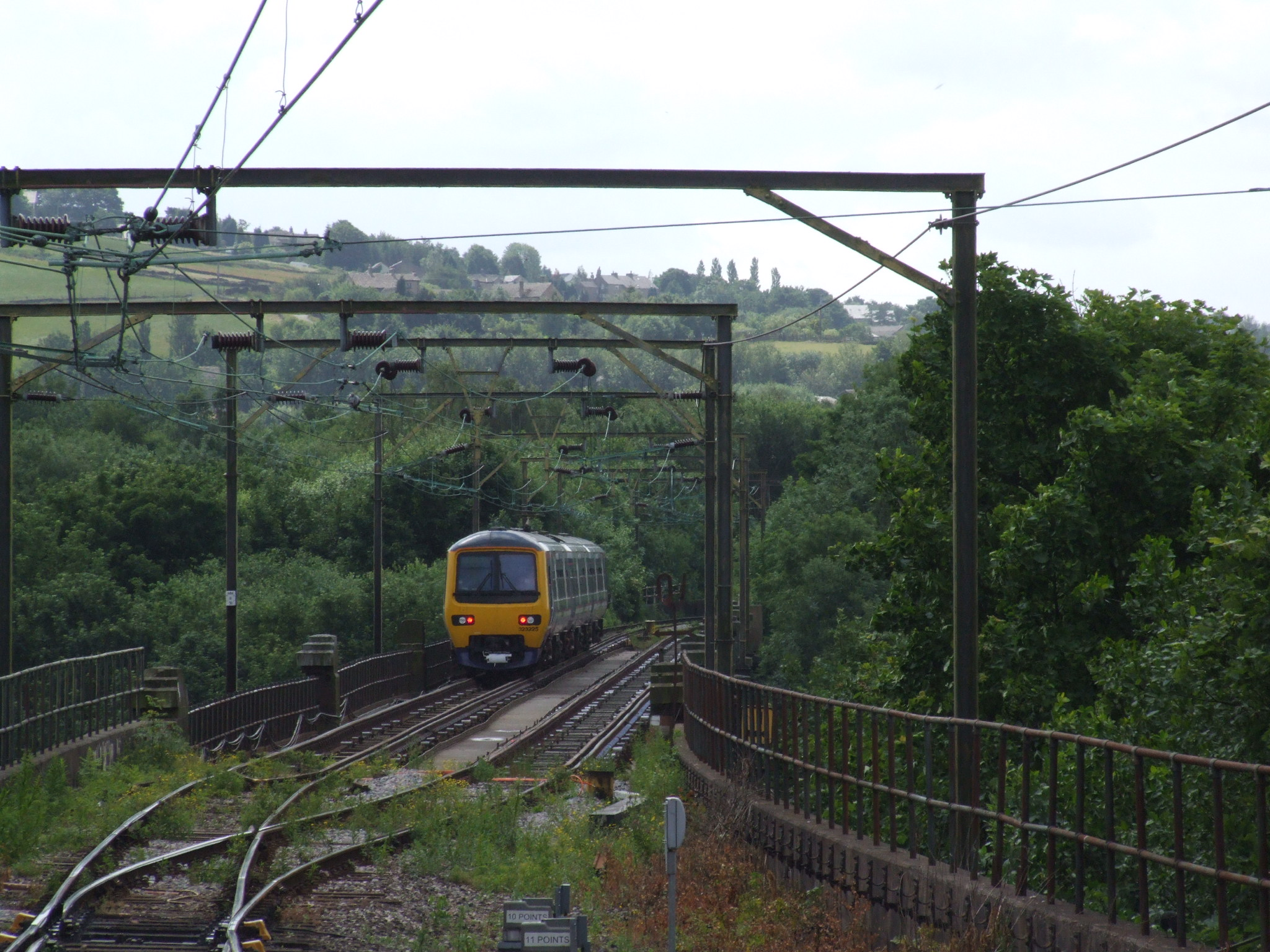
Over the Dinting Viaduct

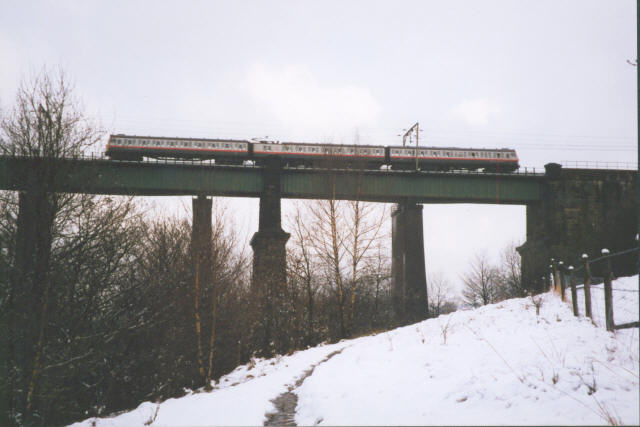
Dinting railway viaduct in the snow, 1994
