= Charlesworth, Derbyshire =

Village and civil parish in Derbyshire, England

Coordinates: 53.433°N 1.993°W

Charlesworth
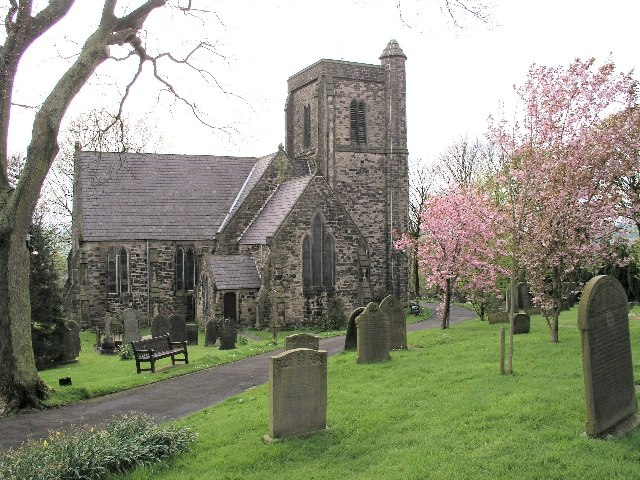
- Church of St John the Baptist

- Location within Derbyshire
- Population: 2,449 (2011)
- OS grid reference: SK005929
- District: High Peak
- Shire county: Derbyshire
- Region: East Midlands
- Country: England
- Sovereign state: United Kingdom
- Post town: GLOSSOP
- Postcode district: SK13
- Dialling code: 01457
- Police: Derbyshire
- Fire: Derbyshire
- Ambulance: North West
- UK Parliament: High Peak

Charlesworth is a village and civil parish near Glossop, Derbyshire, England. The population of the civil parish at the 2011 Census was 2,449. It is 2 miles (3.2 km) south-west of Glossop town centre and close to the borders of Greater Manchester with the nearby village of Broadbottom in Tameside. The parish church of St John the Baptist was built in 1848–49. The Congregational Chapel was rebuilt from an earlier chapel in 1797. The Baptist Chapel was built in 1835. Broadbottom Bridge, one end of which is in Cheshire, was built in 1683. Charlesworth holds an annual carnival on the second Saturday in July on its recreation ground on Marple Road, which includes fell races and other events.

The village is at the foot of the "Monks' Road", which was used by the monks of Basingwerk Abbey in North Wales. At the top of the road is the Abbot's Chair, the base of a monastic cross also known as the Charlesworth Cross.

== Sport ==
- Charlesworth Cricket Club
- Charlesworth Football Club

== See also ==
- Listed buildings in Charlesworth, Derbyshire
