= Hadfield railway station =

Railway station in Derbyshire, England

Hadfield
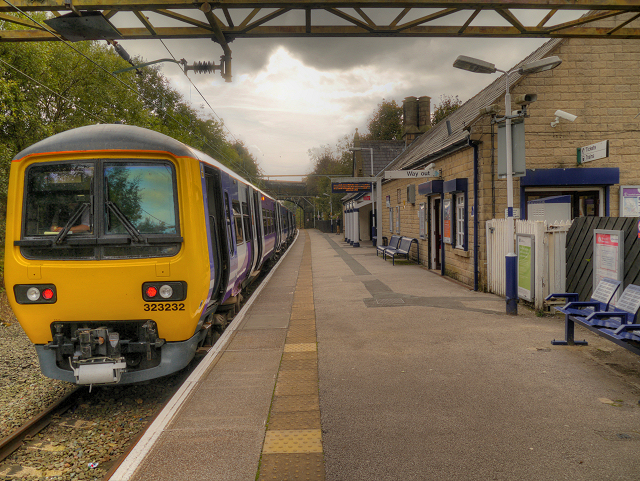

General information
- Location: Hadfield, High Peak, England
- Coordinates: 53.461°N 1.965°W
- Grid reference: SK023959
- Manager: Northern Trains
- Transit authority: Transport for Greater Manchester (Note: Hadfield is one of three stations considered to be part of the Greater Manchester rail network, which do not form part of the Greater Manchester county)
- Platforms: 1

Other information
- Station code: HDF
- Classification: DfT category E

History
- Original company: Sheffield, Ashton-under-Lyne and Manchester Railway
- Pre-grouping: Great Central Railway
- Post-grouping: London and North Eastern Railway

Key dates
- 7 August 1844: Station opened

Passengers
- 2020/21: ▼0.110 million
- 2021/22: ▲0.238 million
- 2022/23: ▼0.225 million
- 2023/24: ▲0.245 million
- 2024/25: ▲0.263 million
Location
Notes
- Passenger statistics from the Office of Rail and Road

Hadfield railway station serves the Peak District town of Hadfield, in Derbyshire, England. It is one of twin termini at the Derbyshire end of the Glossop Line; the other being Glossop. The station was opened by the Sheffield, Ashton-under-Lyne and Manchester Railway in 1844, as a stop on the Woodhead Line between Manchester Store Street and Sheffield Victoria. Hadfield is now the eastern terminus for local trains to/from Manchester Piccadilly.

== History ==
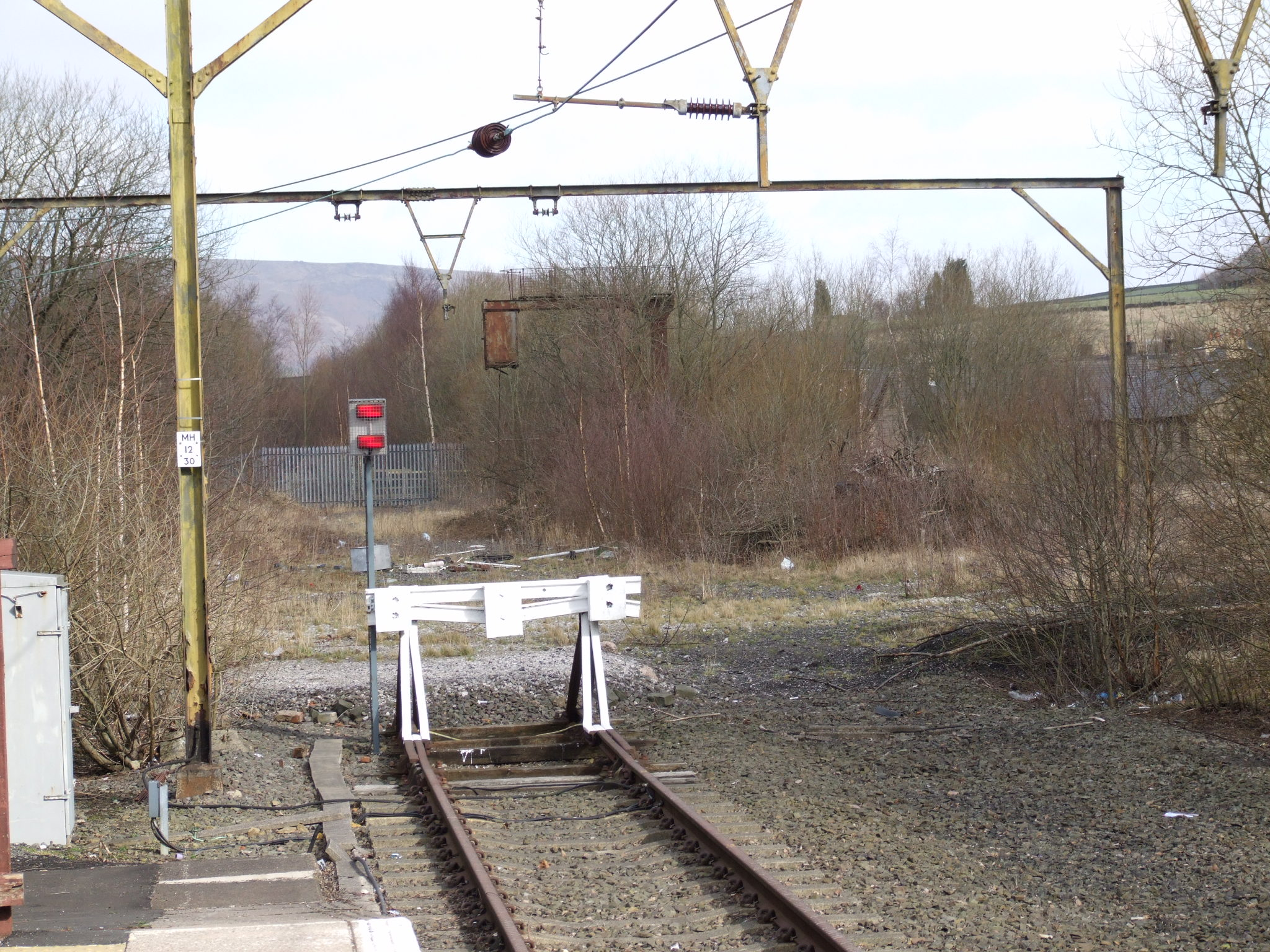
Looking east; beyond the buffer stops lies the former Woodhead Line

The Sheffield, Ashton-under-Lyne and Manchester Railway was authorised in May 1837 and the line was opened in stages. The section between Dinting (known as Glossop until 9 June 1845) and Woodhead was formally opened on 7 August 1844, with the public service beginning the next day. Initially, there were five trains per day (weekdays and Sundays) in each direction over this stretch, running between Manchester Store Street and Woodhead, except for one eastbound train which on weekdays commenced its journey at Newton for Hyde. The trains called at all stations, of which Hadfield was the only intermediate station, also opened on 7 August 1844; some timetables have shown it as Hadfield for Hollingsworth.

The line continued east of Hadfield to Penistone and Sheffield, via the Woodhead Tunnel.

The line between Manchester and Sheffield Victoria was electrified in the early 1950s, including some of its branches; the full electric service between Manchester and Penistone began on 14 June 1954 and this included the local service between Manchester, Glossop and Hadfield. For the local services, eight three-car electric multiple units (later known as Class 506) were provided; these had been built in 1950, but were stored until they were required in 1954. Through trains to Sheffield were hauled by electric locomotives of Class EM1 and Class EM2.

Passenger trains on the Woodhead Line were withdrawn east of Hadfield on 5 January 1970, followed by its complete closure in 1981. The tracks were lifted several years later, but the trackbed is still visible and has been partly adapted as the Longdendale Trail, a shared-use path. Since the end of through passenger services to Penistone and Sheffield, only the former eastbound platform has been used and the section westwards to the junction at Dinting is now single tracked.

From 1954 until 1984, the station was served by Class 506 electric multiple units (EMUs); latterly, these were the only British Rail EMUs capable of operating on the Woodhead Line's non-standard 1,500 V DC electric system. In December 1984, the line was converted to the standard 25,000 V AC system.

At this transition, the Class 506s were withdrawn and were replaced by Class 303 EMUs. In the mid-1990s, they were replaced by Class 305 EMUs. Services have been operated by Class 323 EMUs since 1997.

=== Accidents and incidents ===
- On 8 April 1981, a freight train derailed at the station.

== Facilities ==
The station is staffed six days per week, with the ticket office open from start of service until mid-evening (06:00-19:10 weekdays, 06:30-19:40 Saturdays and closed on Sundays); a self-service ticket machine is also provided. The remainder of the station building is in private commercial use as a public house; part of the frontage onto the platform serves as a covered waiting area for passengers. Train running details are offered via digital information screens, automated announcements and timetable posters. Step-free access is available between the station entrance and platform.

== Service ==
Northern Trains operates a generally half-hourly service Monday to Saturday daytimes to Manchester Piccadilly, via Glossop. Some peak-hour journeys run to or from Manchester directly, via Dinting, missing out the reverse at Glossop; this allows a 20-minute frequency from the same number of trains. The Sunday service is half hourly, though evening services are roughly hourly seven days a week.

| Preceding station | National Rail | Following station |
|---|---|---|
| Glossop | Northern Trains Manchester–Glossop via Hadfield | Dinting |
| Glossop | Northern Trains Manchester–Hadfield via Glossop | Terminus |
| Dinting | Northern Trains Manchester–Hadfield | Terminus |
| | Disused railways | |
| Dinting | SAMR; Woodhead line | Crowden |
