= Glossop railway station =

Railway station in Derbyshire, England

Glossop
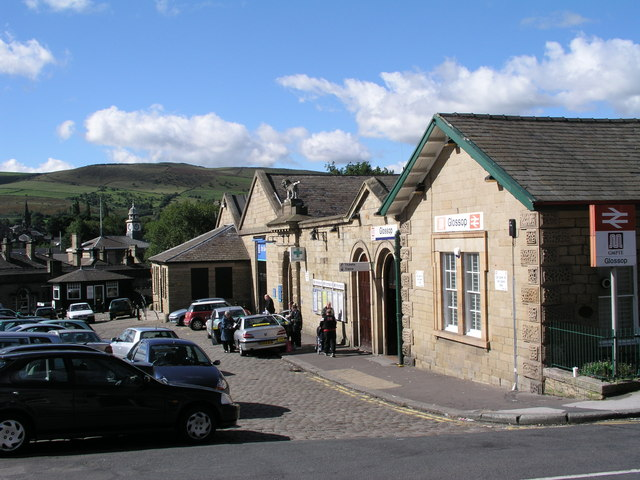
- Glossop railway station in 2006

General information
- Location: Glossop, High Peak; England
- Coordinates: 53.444°N 1.949°W
- Grid reference: SK034942
- Managed by: Northern Trains
- Transit authority: Transport for Greater Manchester (Note: As noted, Glossop is one of three stations to be considered as part of the Greater Manchester rail network but not lying within the metropolitan county)
- Platforms: 1

Other information
- Station code: GLO
- Classification: DfT category D

History
- Original company: Sheffield, Ashton-under-Lyne and Manchester Railway
- Pre-grouping: Great Central Railway
- Post-grouping: London & North Eastern Railway

Key dates
- 9 June 1845: Opened as Glossop for goods only
- 30 June 1845: Opened for all traffic
- 10 July 1922: Renamed Glossop Central
- 6 May 1974: Renamed Glossop

Passengers
- 2020/21: ▼0.253 million
- 2021/22: ▲0.589 million
- 2022/23: ▼0.584 million
- 2023/24: ▲0.670 million
- 2024/25: ▲0.740 million
Location
Notes
- Passenger statistics from the Office of Rail & Road

Glossop railway station serves the Peak District town of Glossop in Derbyshire, England. Glossop is the third busiest railway station in the county of Derbyshire after Derby and Chesterfield. It is located just north of Norfolk Square in the centre of Glossop.

The station is 13 miles (21 km) east of Manchester Piccadilly, and is the terminus of the Glossop line. Together with nearby Derbyshire stations at Hadfield and Dinting, Glossop is considered to be part of the Greater Manchester rail network as it lies only a short distance over the county boundary and the line goes no further into Derbyshire. For that reason the station signs at Glossop feature the Transport for Greater Manchester (TfGM) logo, and the station features on the TfGM rail network map. However, Greater Manchester concessionary fares do not apply to passengers travelling from Glossop, Dinting or Hadfield.

== History ==
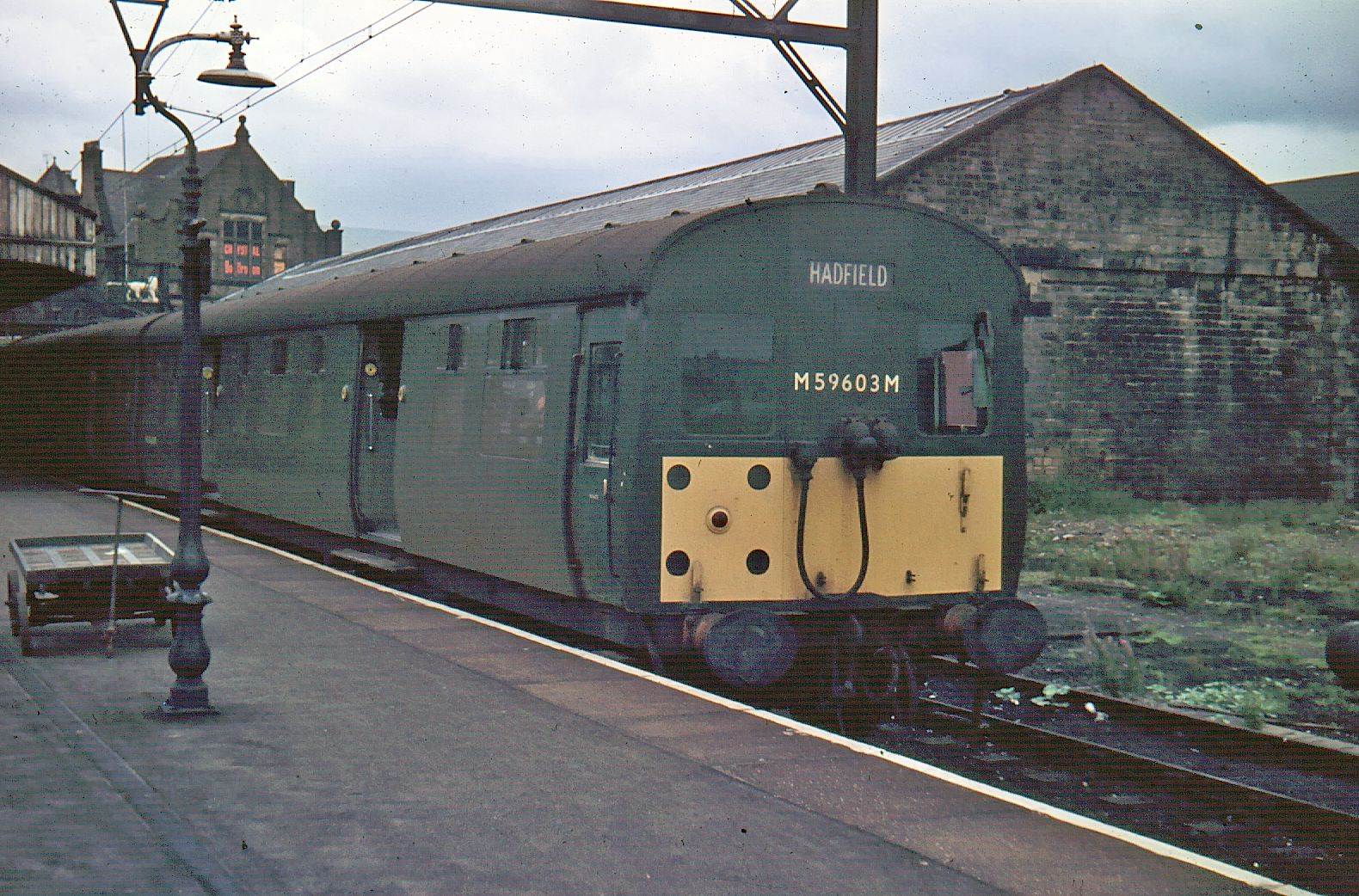
Glossop station in 1967

Henry Howard, 13th Duke of Norfolk built the spur line from Dinting Viaduct to Howard Town over his own land at his own expense. He then sold it to the Sheffield, Ashton-under-Lyne and Manchester Railway for £15,244 10s 10d (equivalent to £1,900,000 in 2023). The station was opened on 9 June 1845 to goods traffic; the formal opening was on 30 June 1845 – it was attended by some of the SA&MR Directors, and passenger traffic began immediately afterward. The station buildings were constructed to the designs of John Grey Weightman and opened in 1847.

There was a previous station called Glossop on the main line but that was renamed Dinting with the opening of the Glossop station on the branch. The new station was originally named Glossop, and was renamed Glossop Central on 10 July 1922, reverting to Glossop on 6 May 1974.

Originally built with two platforms, the station was reduced to one operational platform in the 1970s when the branch was singled. When the voltage changed from 1500 V DC to 25 kV AC on 7 December 1984, the AC trains continued to use the old platform before the single line was transferred from one side of the island to the other. Trains arriving from Manchester Piccadilly reverse to proceed to Hadfield, and vice versa. The other platform face and redundant station buildings were incorporated into an extension for the next door Co-op supermarket and car park, now owned by The Co-operative Group.

The station is now a Grade II Listed building and a blue plaque was unveiled in 2006.

== Services ==
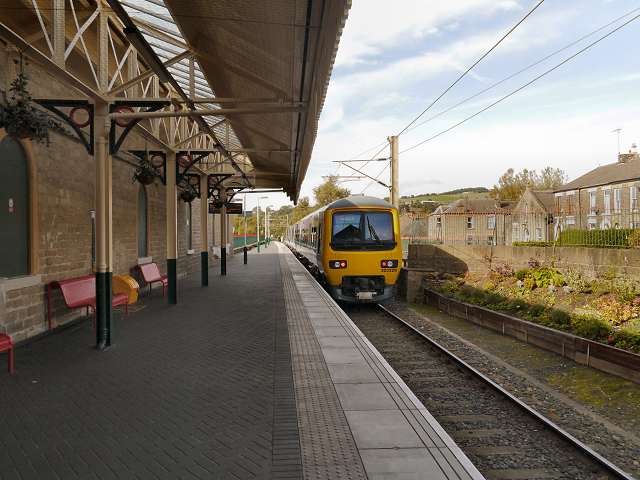
A Northern Rail Class 323 calls at the station in 2012

There is generally a half-hourly daytime service to Manchester Piccadilly and Hadfield. This is increased to every 20 minutes in the morning and evening rush-hour periods. In order to increase the frequency with the same number of units in service, the peak hour timetable is altered so that there is no direct service to Hadfield in the a.m peak (passengers must change at Dinting) and afternoon Manchester services run via Hadfield instead of direct.

Trains operate hourly in the evenings and half-hourly on Sundays. When there is engineering work on Sundays, the replacement bus service only operates hourly.

A number of services to/from Manchester Piccadilly start or terminate at Glossop during the rush hour, early morning and late evening.

All passenger services are operated by Northern Trains, who use Class 323 EMUs.

Preceding station	National Rail	Following station
Dinting	Northern Trains Glossop line	Hadfield

== Facilities ==
Glossop station is the busiest on the line from Manchester Piccadilly (excluding Piccadilly itself). The ticket office is open seven days a week (Monday - Saturday 06:25 - 19:40, Sunday 10:00 - 17:30). Outside the station building, on Norfolk Street, is a small car park. The town's main bus stop and taxi rank are located 30 yards from the station entrance, on Henry Street. The former station hotel is now the George Hotel, located on the other side of Norfolk Street from the station. Also very close by are the Star and Norfolk Arms public houses.

On 2 September 2011 a £75,000 refurbishment of the station was officially opened with a new ticket office and waiting room. The waiting room features past photographs of the railway station and work by local Derbyshire artists.

Automatic ticket barriers are in operation at the station.

Train running details are offered via automated announcements, digital information displays and timetable posters. A payphone is also provided in the entrance hall. Level access is provided between the entrance ticket hall and platform.

== Friends of Glossop Station ==
The Friends of Glossop Station (FOGS) was formed in 2002 as a splinter group of Glossop Environmental Trust (GET). They are an active station adoption group who have carried out a number of projects at the station, including creating a station garden, painting cast iron railings, holding 'Community Rail Days' and beautifying the station with hanging baskets, floral displays and redecorating.

== See also ==
- Listed buildings in Glossop
