= List of works by E. H. Shellard =

Edwin Hugh Shellard (usually known as E. H. Shellard) was an English architect who worked from an office in Manchester, and who flourished between 1844 and 1864. Most of his output was in the design of churches in Northwest England, and he was successful in gaining at least 13 contracts for Commissioners' churches. The Commissioners' churches in the list are denoted by †.

== Key ==
Grade	Criteria
Grade II*	Particularly important buildings of more than special interest.
Grade II	Buildings of national importance and special interest.

== Works ==
Name	Location	Image	Date	Notes	Grade
St Peter's Church †	Blackley, Greater Manchester; 53.5235°N 2.2180°W		1844–45	A Commissioners' church in Gothic Revival style, enlarged in 1880.	II*
St James' Church	Whitfield, Glossop, Derbyshire; 53.4387°N 1.9528°W		1844–1846	A Gothic Revival church, later extended.	II
St Thomas' Church	Biggin, Derbyshire; 53.1311°N 1.7708°W		1844–1848	Gothic Revival church in limestone with grindstone dressings. It has a west tower.	II
St Thomas' Church †	Lees, Greater Manchester; 53.5367°N 2.0727°W		1844–1848	A Commissioners' church. The tower was added in 1855.	II*
St John's Church †	Failsworth, Greater Manchester; 53.5118°N 2.1545°W		1845–46	A Gothic Revival Commissioners' church with a west steeple. Tower added 1878; restored during the 20th century.	II
St Stephen's Church †	Audenshaw, Greater Manchester; 53.4749°N 2.1153°W		1845–1847	Gothic Revival with a tower. Chancel added 1900.	II
St Mary's Church †	Droylsden, Greater Manchester; 53.4799°N 2.1432°W		1846–1848	Gothic Revival with a tower and spire.	II
St John's Church †	Shuttleworth, Ramsbottom, Greater Manchester; 53.6556°N 2.3031°W		1847	Gothic Revival with bell turrets.	—
St Mark's Church †	Bredbury, Greater Manchester; 53.4241°N 2.1050°W		1847–48	Gothic Revival with a west tower.	II
Holy Trinity Church †	Coldhurst, Oldham, Greater Manchester; 53.5501°N 2.1173°W		1847–48	Gothic Revival with a bell tower. Enlarged 1887–91.	II
St John the Evangelist's Church †	Hurst, Ashton-under-Lyne, Greater Manchester; 53.5002°N 2.0813°W		1847–1849	Gothic Revival with a bell turret. Enlarged in 1862.	II
St John's Church	Lytham St Annes, Lancashire; 53.7369°N 2.9549°W		1848–49	A church in Early English style; extended by Shellard in 1856–57.	II*
St Matthew's Church	Chadderton, Greater Manchester; 53.5568°N 2.1516°W		1848–1857	Gothic Revival church with a steeple added in 1877.	II
St John the Evangelist's Church	Ashton Hayes, Cheshire; 53.2230°N 2.7397°W		1849	A Gothic Revival church. Alterations were made in 1900 by Douglas and Minshull, and in 1932 by Theodore Fyfe.	II
St John the Baptist's Church †	Godley, Greater Manchester; 53.4549°N 2.0644°W		1849	Gothic Revival style. West tower added 1878.	II
Thorncliffe Hall	Hollingworth, Greater Manchester	—	c. 1850	A country house remodelled in Neo-Jacobean style; used as his own residence.	—
St Thomas' Church †	Helmshore, Lancashire; 53.6872°N 2.3302°W		1850–51	Gothic Revival with west tower.	II
Christ Church	Pennington, Greater Manchester; 53.4913°N 2.5226°W		1850–1854	Gothic Revival with west tower.	II
All Saints Church	Glazebury, Warrington, Cheshire; 53.4696°N 2.4952°W		1851	A small church with a bellcote and without aisles.	II
St Mark's Church †	Hulme, Greater Manchester	—	1851–52	Gothic Revival. Demolished.	—
Holy Trinity Church	Stalybridge, Tameside, Greater Manchester; 53.4826°N 2.0557°W		1851–52	A church with a clerestory and west tower.	II
St Michael's Church	Weeton, Lancashire; 53.7996°N 2.9358°W		1852	Enlarged a church built in 1843, extending the west end.	II
St Mary's Church	Preston, Lancashire; 53.7615°N 2.6866°W		1852–53	Shellard added a chancel and transepts in similar style to a church built in 1836–38, which is in Romanesque Revival style. Since converted into a conservation centre.	II
Big School	Rossall School, Lancashire	—	1852–53	A hall flanked by two-storey wings, one of which has a crenellated tower.	—
St John's Church	Preston, Lancashire; 53.7585°N 2.6962°W		1853–1855	Replacing an earlier church on the site, this is in Decorated style with a west steeple, and is considered to be Shellard's finest work.	II*
St Michael and All Angels Church	Mottram in Longdendale, Tameside, Greater Manchester; 53.4544°N 2.0101°W		1854–55	Shellard made alterations to a church dating from the 15th century, which included raising the roof, changing the windows in the clerestory, and remodelling the interior of the church.	II*
St Paul's Church †	Pendleton, Greater Manchester; 53.4875°N 2.2842°W		1855–56	Gothic Revival with a bell turret. The church was reordered in the 1970s by Stephen Dykes Bower	II
Steeple of St George's Church	Charlestown, Greater Manchester; 53.49723°N 2.28237°W		1858	Only the steeple remains of this church.	II
St Luke's Church	Preston, Lancashire; 53.7661°N 2.6835°W		1858–59	Converted for residential use in the late 20th century.	II
