= St Michael and All Angels Church, Mottram =

Coordinates: 53.4544°N 2.0101°W

St Michael and All Angels' Church, Mottram
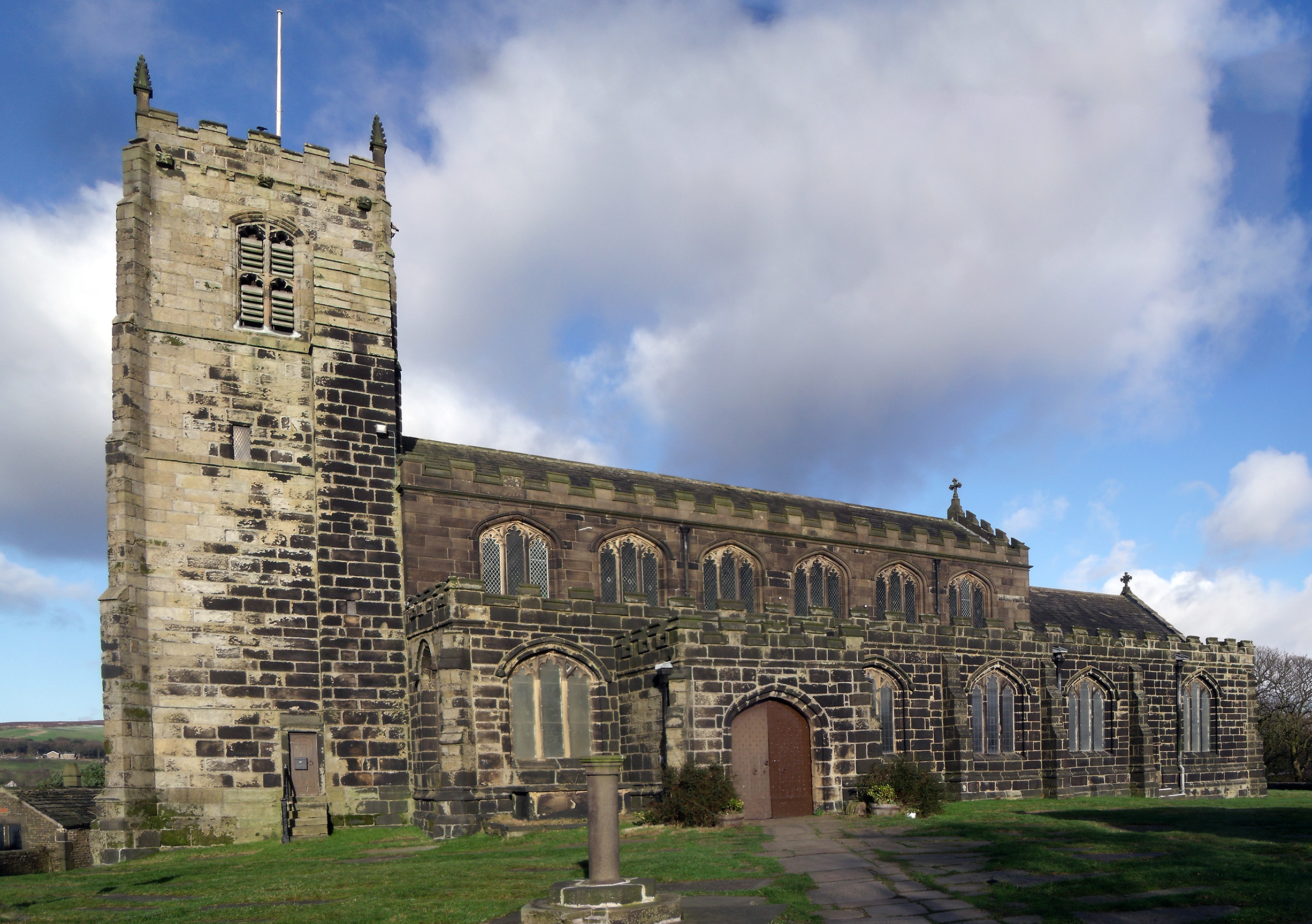
- St Michael and All Angels' Church, Mottram, from the south

- Location in Greater Manchester
- OS grid reference: SJ 997 953
- Location: Mottram in Longdendale, Greater Manchester
- Country: England
- Denomination: Anglican
- Website: The Parish of Mottram-in-Longdendale

History
- Status: Church
- Dedication: St Michael

Architecture
- Functional status: Active
- Heritage designation: Grade II*
- Designated: 1 November 1966
- Architectural type: Church
- Style: Perpendicular
- Completed: 1855

Specifications
- Materials: Stone, slate roof

Administration
- Province: York
- Diocese: Chester
- Archdeaconry: Macclesfield
- Deanery: Mottram
- Parish: Mottram in Longdendale

Clergy
- Vicar: Rev Cait Walker

St Michael and All Angels Church stands on Warhill overlooking the village of Mottram in Longdendale, Greater Manchester, England. The church is recorded in the National Heritage List for England as a designated Grade II* listed building. It is an active Anglican parish church in the diocese of Chester, the archdeaconry of Macclesfield and the deanery of Mottram.

== History ==
The earliest evidence of a church on the site is in 1225 when clergy attached to the church were witnesses to local documents. There is a further reference to the church in a taxation document dated 1291. The present church dates from the end of the 15th century. A major restoration took place in 1854–55 by E. H. Shellard, during which the nave roof was raised.

== Architecture ==
=== Exterior ===
The church is built from local stone quarried from Tinsell-Norr in Perpendicular style. The plan consists of a west tower, a five-bay nave with a clerestory, north and south aisles, a two-bay chancel and a south porch. At the east end of each aisle is a chapel. The north chapel is known as the Hollingworth Chapel and the south chapel is the Staley Chapel. The tower is in four stages with angled buttresses, a three-light west window above which is a clock face and two-light belfry openings. In one corner is a stair turret. At the top is a castellated parapet with crocketed corner finials.

=== Interior ===
The oldest item in the church is the barrel-shaped Norman font. Above the chancel arch are painted panels containing the Ten Commandments, the Lord's Prayer and Creed, together with a painting of Moses and Aaron. The alabaster pulpit of 1885 is by Harry Hems. The brass chandelier is dated 1755. The stained glass windows include one by Kempe.

The Hollingworth Chapel is now used as a choir vestry and meeting room, the organ having been replaced by an electronic instrument in 1998. In the chapel is a white marble monument to Reginald Bretland who died in 1703. The Staveley Chapel contains two sandstone effigies which are thought to be those of Sir Ralph Staveley (or Staveleigh) and his wife dating from the early 15th century. There is also a memorial in memory of police officers Nicola Hughes and Fiona Bone who were murdered in the parish in 2012. There is a ring of eight bells which were cast in 1910 by John Taylor and Company. The parish registers date from 1559 for marriages and burials and from 1562 for baptisms.

== External features ==
In the churchyard stands a sundial with a dial dated 1811. It consists of a stone shaft topped with a copper dial and a gnomon, and it is listed at Grade II. Also listed at Grade II are the gatepiers, railings, steps, and walls surrounding the churchyard. Near the church is a cross, believed to be of medieval origin, which was restored in 1760 and again in 1897, the latter restoration commemorating the Diamond Jubilee of Queen Victoria. The octagonal shaft rises from a stepped circular ashlar plinth, and on its top sits a cubical sundial with three copper faces. This structure is listed at Grade II*.

== See also ==
- Grade II* listed buildings in Greater Manchester
- Listed buildings in Longdendale
- List of works by E. H. Shellard

== Gallery ==
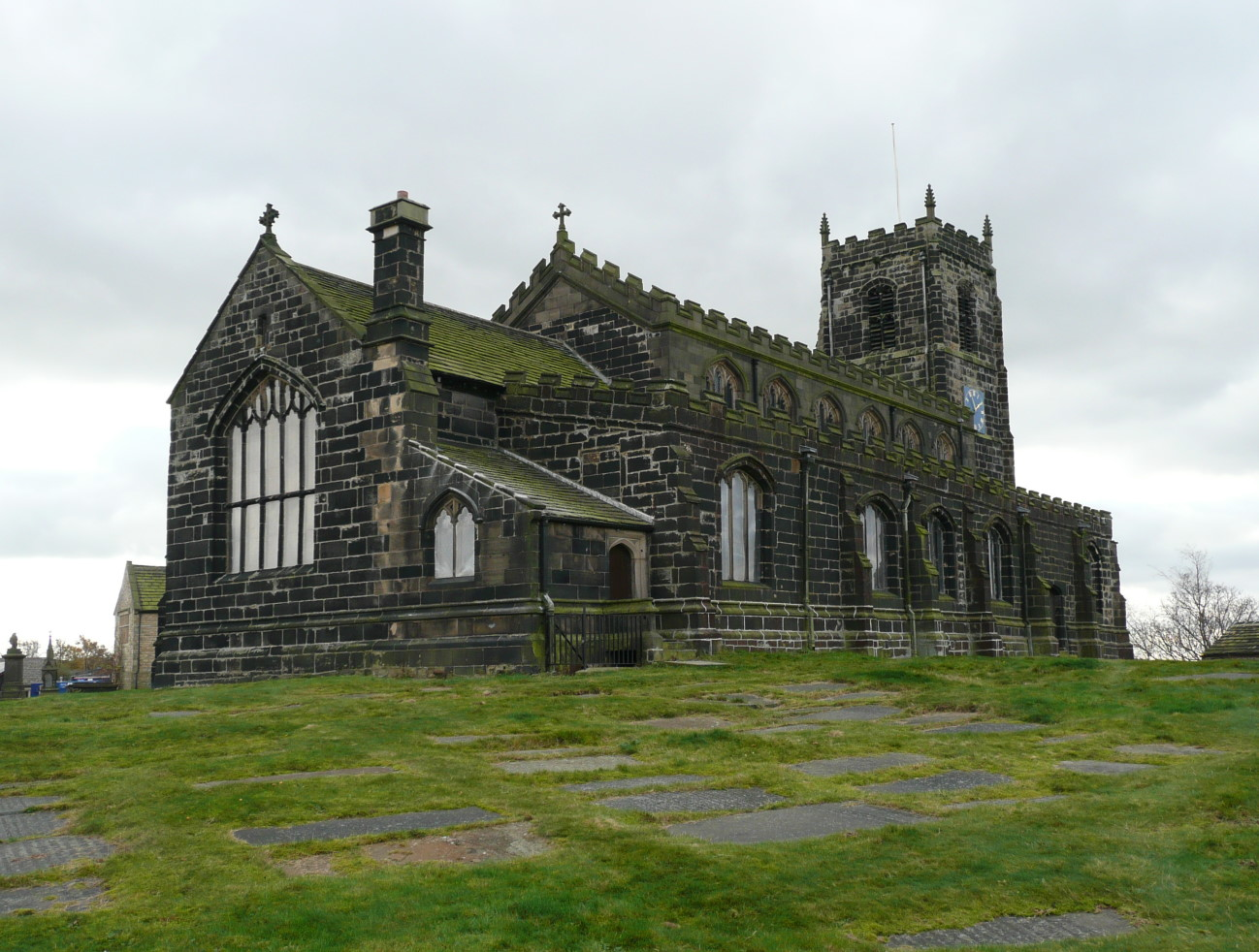

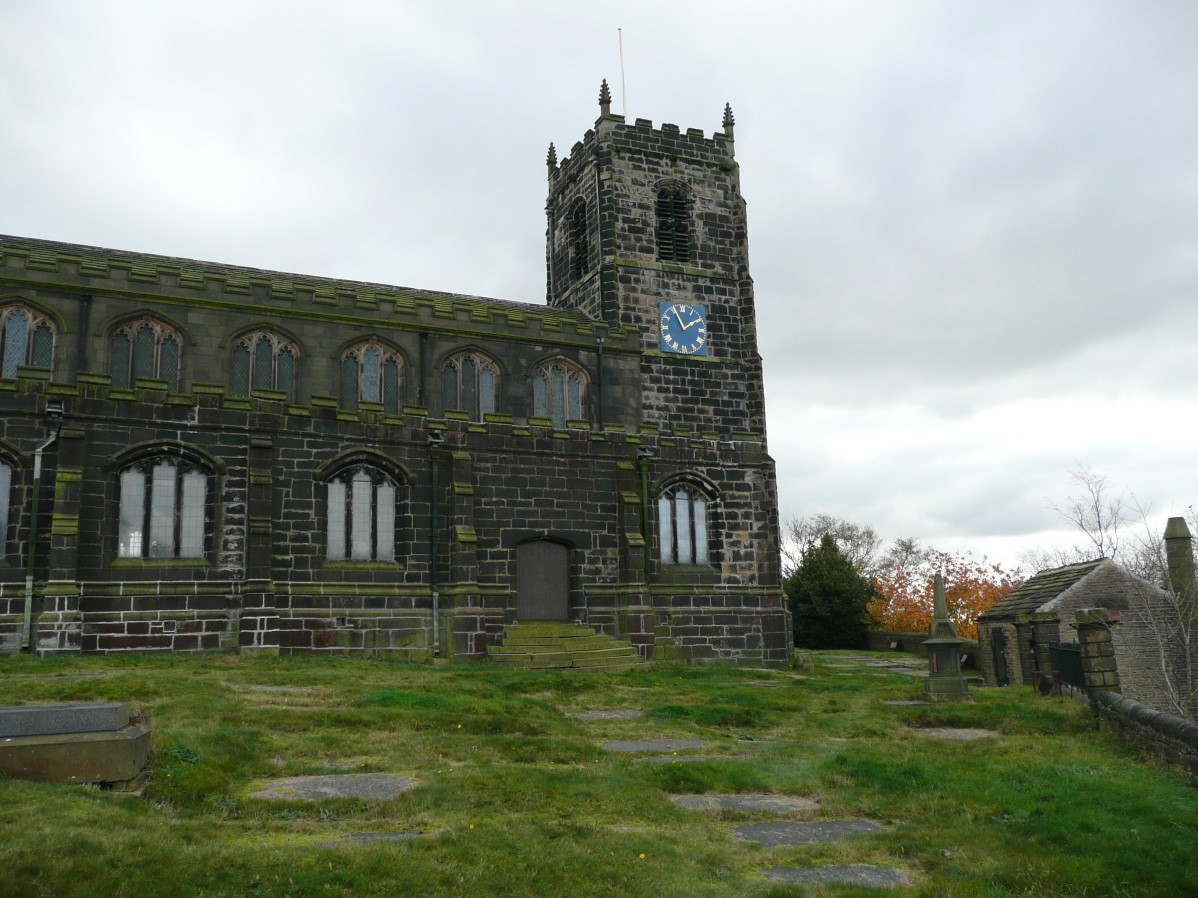

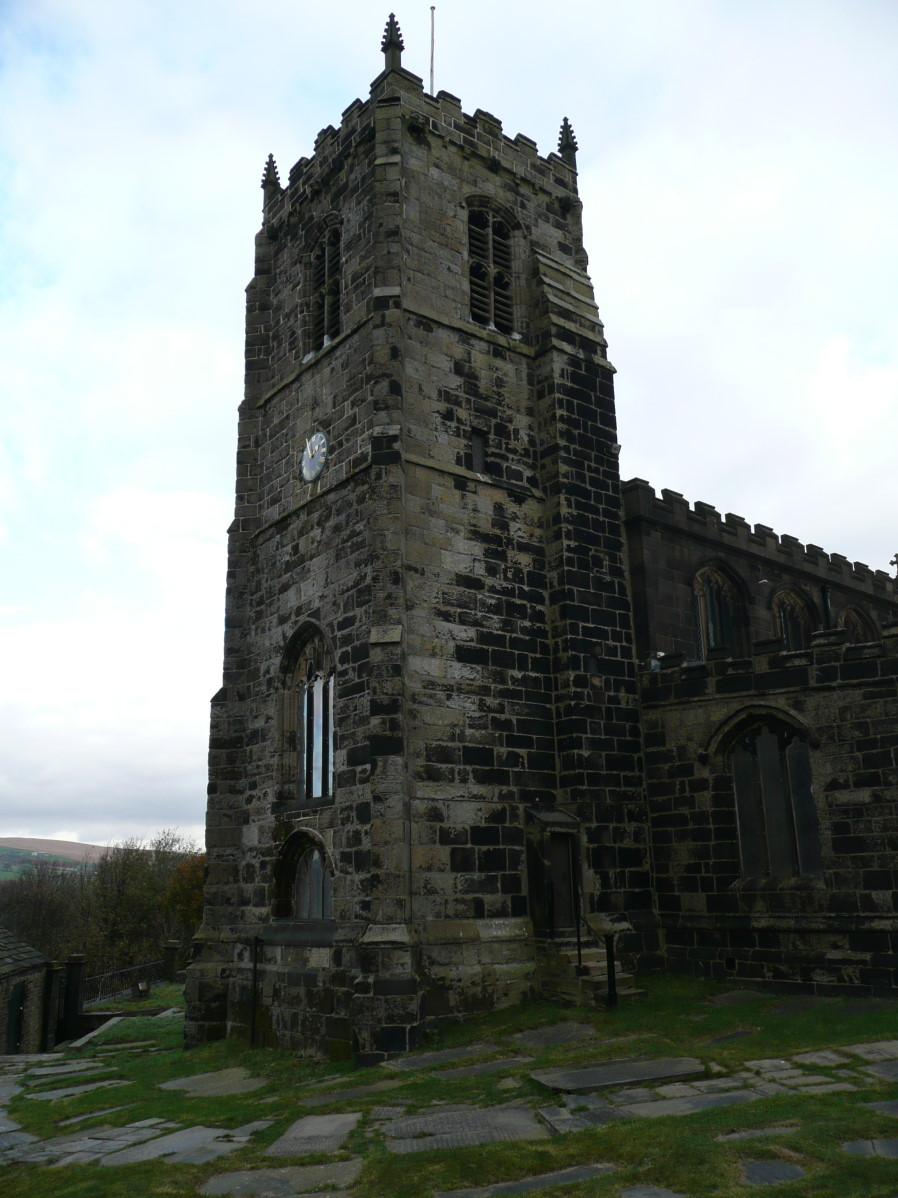
