= Listed buildings in Lees, Greater Manchester =

Lees is a village in the Metropolitan Borough of Oldham, Greater Manchester, England and it is unparished. It contains seven listed buildings that are recorded in the National Heritage List for England. Of these, one is listed at Grade II*, the middle grade, and the others are at Grade II, the lowest grade. The listed buildings consist of two churches, a public house, a mill, two houses, and a war memorial.

== Key ==
Grade	Criteria
II*	Particularly important buildings of more than special interest
II	Buildings of national importance and special interest

== Buildings ==
Name and location	Photograph	Date	Notes	Grade
The Grapes Inn and adjoining barn 53.53858°N 2.07193°W		1741	A stone public house with a slate roof, and an adjoining barn with a stone-slate roof. The pub has two storeys; it originated with two bays, an additional bay was added to each end in the late 18th century, and the barn to the left in the 19th century. The original part has a central doorway with a keystone lintel and mullioned windows. The windows in the right end bay are mullioned, and in the left bay they are sashes. The barn to the left has a segmental-headed cart entry, a doorway, and round openings at the top.	II
St John the Baptist's Church; 53.54255°N 2.06781°W		1742	The church was extended by two bays in 1772, and alterations were made in 1842 and in 1865. It is in stone with quoins, a band, an eaves cornice, and a slate roof. The church consists of a nave, a chancel, and a lean-to extension at the west end. On the west gable is an octagonal cupola with Doric columns, a balustrade, urns at the angles, a domed roof and a finial.	II
Sun Hill House; 53.54309°N 2.06893°W	—	Late 18th century	Originally one house, later divided into two, it is in stone on a projecting plinth, with an eaves cornice and a roof partly of slate and partly of stone-slate. There is a double-depth plan, two storeys and five bays. The central doorway has an architrave, a pulvinated frieze, and a pediment, and there is an inserted door to the left. The windows on the front are casements replacing sashes, and at the rear are mullioned windows.	II
Hey Lane Mill; 53.53858°N 2.07193°W	—	1800	The mill was much extended in about 1830–40. It is in stone, and consists of two four-storey ranges at right angles. The east range has twelve bays and a gable end of four bays at the south, and a south range of eleven bays with a return of four bays, in which are Venetian windows.	II
Wellfield House; 53.53665°N 2.06963°W	—	c. 1840	A stone house on a projecting plinth, with an eaves cornice, a blocking course, and a hipped slate roof. There are two storeys, a symmetrical front of five bays, and rear extension. On the front is a central decorative cast iron trellised porch, and a doorway with pilasters, a segmental fanlight, and a hood mould on consoles. The windows are replacement casements. On the extension is a guilloché frieze.	II
Church of St Thomas; 53.53675°N 2.07267°W		1848	A Commissioners' church that was designed by E. H. Shellard in Perpendicular style, with the tower added in 1855, and the organ chamber in 1885. It is in stone with a slate roof, and consists of a nave, north and south aisles, a south two-storey porch, a chancel with a vestry and an organ chamber, and a west tower. The tower has four stages, a doorway, a four-light west window, clock faces, diagonal buttresses rising to crocketed pinnacles, gargoyles, and an embattled parapet. Along the sides of the church are buttresses rising to crocketed pinnacles and embattled parapets, and between the nave and the chancel are pinnacled turrets.	II*
War memorial 53.53462°N 2.07395°W		1921	The war memorial is in Lees Cemetery. It has a tall stone pedestal on which is a bronze statue depicting a soldier holding a rifle. On the pedestal are inscriptions and carved garlands.	II
