= Listed buildings in Weeton-with-Preese =

Weeton-with-Preese is a civil parish in the Borough of Fylde, Lancashire, England. It contains three buildings that are recorded in the National Heritage List for England as designated listed buildings, all of which are listed at Grade II. This grade is the lowest of the three gradings given to listed buildings and is applied to "buildings of national importance and special interest". Apart from the village of Weeton, the parish is rural. The listed buildings consist of a former farmhouse, a former farm building, and a church.

== Buildings ==
Name and location	Photograph	Date	Notes
Barn, Church Road End Farm; 53.80472°N 2.93725°W	—	17th century (probable)	A cruck-framed barn in brick with a slate roof at two levels. There are four bays, the east bay added later and at a lower level. At the junction there is a full cruck truss.
Knowsley Farmhouse; 53.80476°N 2.93492°W	—	1673	The former farmhouse is in brick with a thatched roof and gables with crow-stepped parapets. It has two storeys and there are three windows on each front. The original doorway has been blocked, there is a datestone above it, and the present doorway has a thatched canopy. Most of the windows have been altered.
St Michael's Church; 53.79955°N 2.93578°W		1843	The church was extended at the west end in 1852 by E. H. Shellard. It is in Early English style, and built in brick with stone dressings and a slate roof. The church consists of a nave with a north porch, and a chancel with a south vestry, and there is a bellcote on the west gable. The windows are lancets.
