= Church of St Thomas, Lees =

Listed church in Greater Manchester, England

Church of St Thomas
- St Thomas the Apostle Church, Leesfield
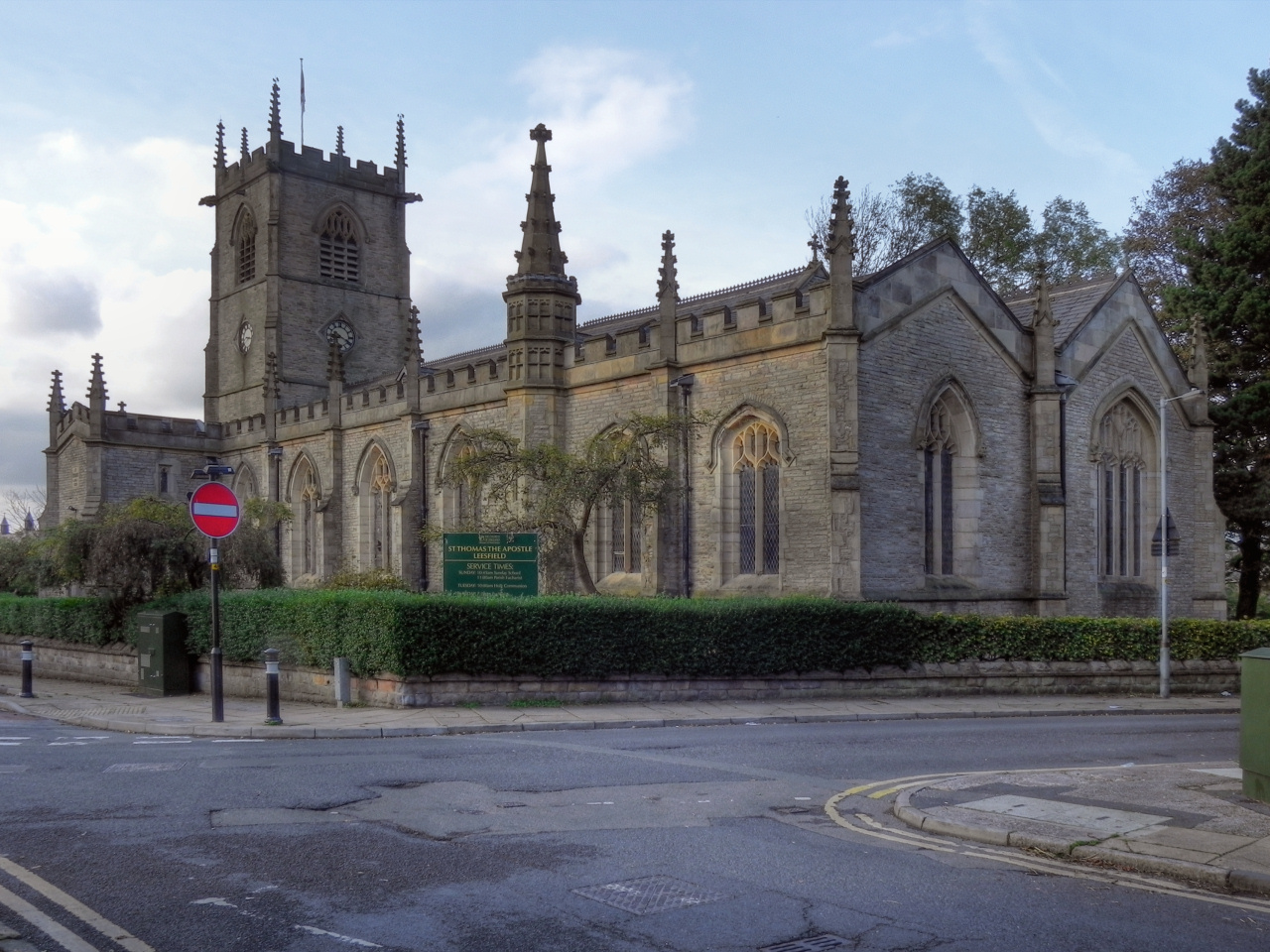
- The church in 2011

- Location in Greater Manchester
- 53.5367°N 2.0726°W
- OS grid reference: SD 95286 04454
- Address: West Street, Lees, Greater Manchester
- Country: England
- Denomination: Anglican
- Website: Church of St Thomas

History
- Dedication: St Thomas
- Consecrated: 21 June 1848

Architecture
- Heritage designation: Grade II*
- Designated: 22 August 1967
- Architect: E. H. Shellard
- Architectural type: Church
- Style: Perpendicular Gothic Revival
- Years built: 1848; 178 years ago 1855 (tower); 1885 (organ chamber)

Specifications
- Materials: Stone, slate

Administration
- Archdiocese: Archdeaconry of Rochdale
- Diocese: Diocese of Manchester

Clergy
- Priest: Revd Lyn Woodall

The Church of St Thomas is an Anglican parish church on West Street in Lees, a village within the Metropolitan Borough of Oldham, Greater Manchester, England. It is an active church in the Diocese of Manchester and is recorded in the National Heritage List for England as a Grade II* listed building.

== History ==
The village of Lees lay within the chapelry of Leesfield, which formed part of the ancient parishes of Prestwich and Ashton-under-Lyne. The name does not appear on historic maps, but the present church and Leesfield Church of England Primary School stand within the centre of Lees.

The Church of St Thomas was designed in the Perpendicular Gothic Revival style by the Manchester‑based ecclesiastical architect E. H. Shellard, and was built as a Commissioners' church.

It was consecrated on 21 June 1848 by James Prince Lee, the first bishop of Manchester. A west tower was added in 1855, followed by the construction of an organ chamber in 1885.

On 22 August 1967, the Church of St Thomas was designated a Grade II* listed building.

The church underwent a major programme of renovation between 1995 and 2004. The works cost approximately £1 million, and the building is consequently regarded as being in good overall condition.

== Architecture ==
The church is constructed of hammer-dressed stone with a slate‑covered roof. It comprises a nave, aisles, tower, and a chancel, alongside an organ chamber and a vestry. The plan includes a six‑bay nave and a two‑bay chancel, both with a sill band and a parapet that is castellated. Each of the bays contain a weathered buttress surmounted by a crocketed pinnacle, together with a two‑light window set beneath a hood mould. The porch in the second bay carries the date "1848" above its arched doorway. The east end has a four‑light window. The west tower is of four stages, castellated, and features a four‑centred arched doorway, a four‑light west window, clock faces, three‑light belfry openings, and diagonal buttresses with crocketed pinnacles.

=== Interior ===
Internally, octagonal columns carry a double‑chamfered nave arcade. The hammerbeam roof trusses rise from carved head corbels. There is no clerestory, but the nave is lit by dormer windows. A west gallery is provided, its parapet formed as a blind arcade. The fittings include poppyhead pews, dado panelling, a carved pulpit, and choir stalls with canopies by Shaw of Uppermill. The chancel contains a carved stone reredos and associated panelling. The stained glass is extensive, with much of it produced by Jean-Baptiste Capronnier between 1874 and 1898.

== See also ==
- Grade II* listed buildings in Greater Manchester
- List of works by E. H. Shellard
- Listed buildings in Lees, Greater Manchester
