= Grapes Inn, Lees =

Listed pub in Greater Manchester, England

Grapes Inn
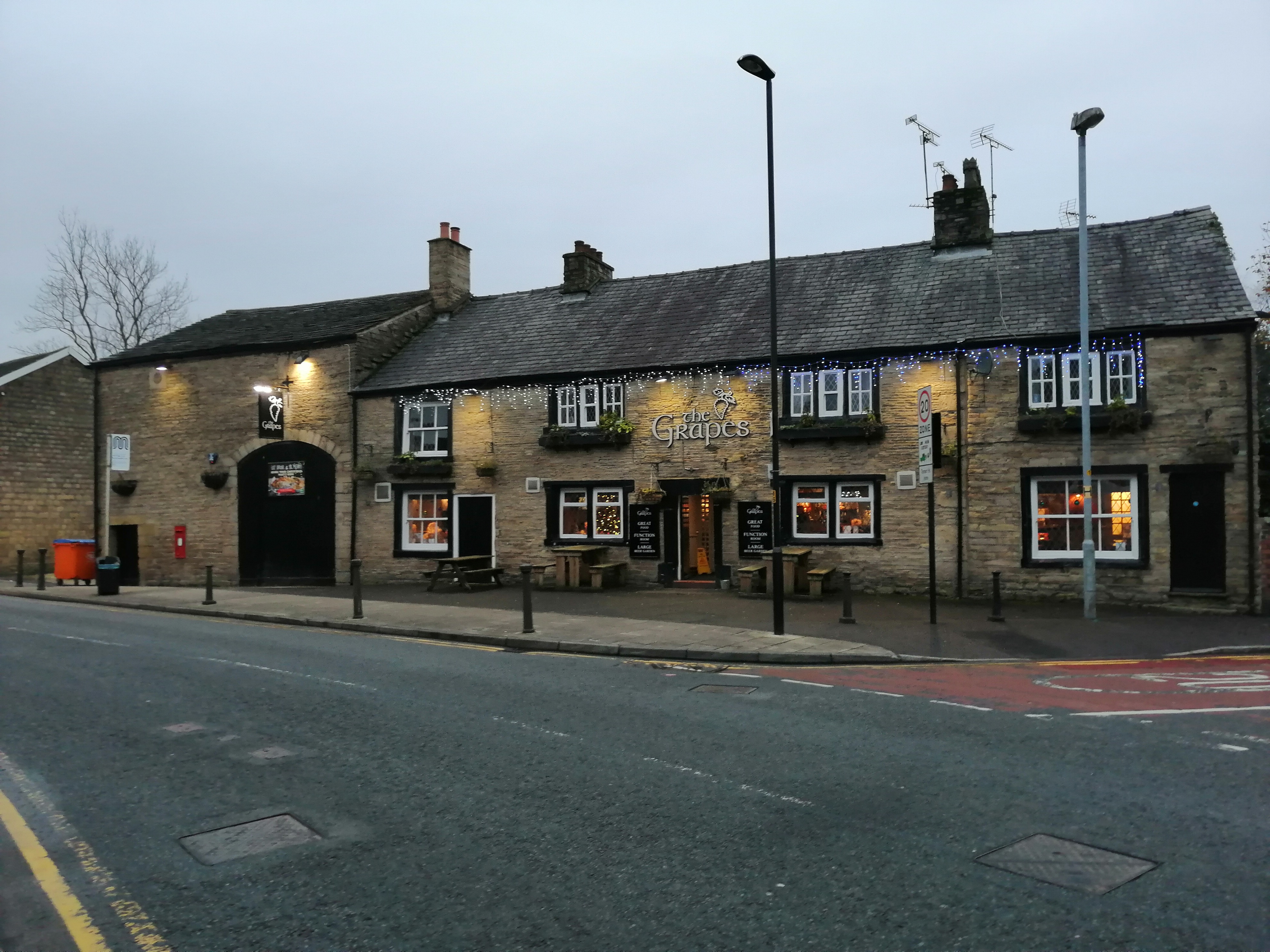
- The pub in 2019

- Location within Greater Manchester
- Alternative names: The Grapes

General information
- Type: Public house
- Location: 161 St John Street, Lees, Greater Manchester, England
- Coordinates: 53.5419°N 2.0678°W
- Year built: 1741; 285 years ago
- Renovated: Late 18th century (extended); 19th century (barn added)
- Owner: Punch Taverns

Design and construction
- Designations

Listed Building – Grade II
- Official name: The Grapes Inn and adjoining barn
- Designated: 22 August 1967
- Reference no.: 1356417

Website
- grapespuboldham.com

The Grapes Inn (now trading as The Grapes) is a Grade II listed public house on St John Street in Lees, a town within the Metropolitan Borough of Oldham, Greater Manchester, England. Built in 1741 but having undergone alterations and additions since then, it has functioned as a pub for more than two centuries and remains in operation today.

== History ==
The door lintel carries the date "1741", but the structure was subsequently altered and extended, according to its official listing. The 1893 and 1934 Ordnance Survey maps mark the building as the Grapes Inn.

On 22 August 1967, the Grapes Inn was designated a Grade II listed building.

The pub was operated by Inglenook Inns and Taverns in 2021, and as of 2024 is owned by Punch Taverns. In 2024 Oldham Council approved a proposal for three three‑bed homes on part of the car park outside the pub, resulting in the loss of 15 spaces. The plans drew local objections relating to traffic and parking concerns.

== Architecture ==
The building is constructed of roughly finished stone and has slate roofs, with the main part covered in slate and the attached barn roofed in stone slates of varying sizes. It follows a narrow, single‑depth layout with two bays and two storeys, but one bay was added at each end in the late 18th century, and a barn was added on the left in the 19th century.

The earlier central section has a doorway in the middle with a plain stone surround and a keystone above, set between two ground‑floor windows that were once three‑light openings. The upper floor has three‑light windows. All these openings have stone mullions with simple moulding. There are corner stones on the right-hand side.

The bay added on the right has windows of the same general type, though the lower one has been altered, and it also has a rear wing. The added bay on the left contains a sash window with six panes on each floor.

The barn has a wide arched opening for carts, a doorway to the left, and small round openings at first‑floor level. Later brick extensions stand at the back.

== See also ==
- Listed buildings in Lees, Greater Manchester
- Listed pubs in Greater Manchester
