= The Eagle at Weeton =

Pub in Lancashire, England

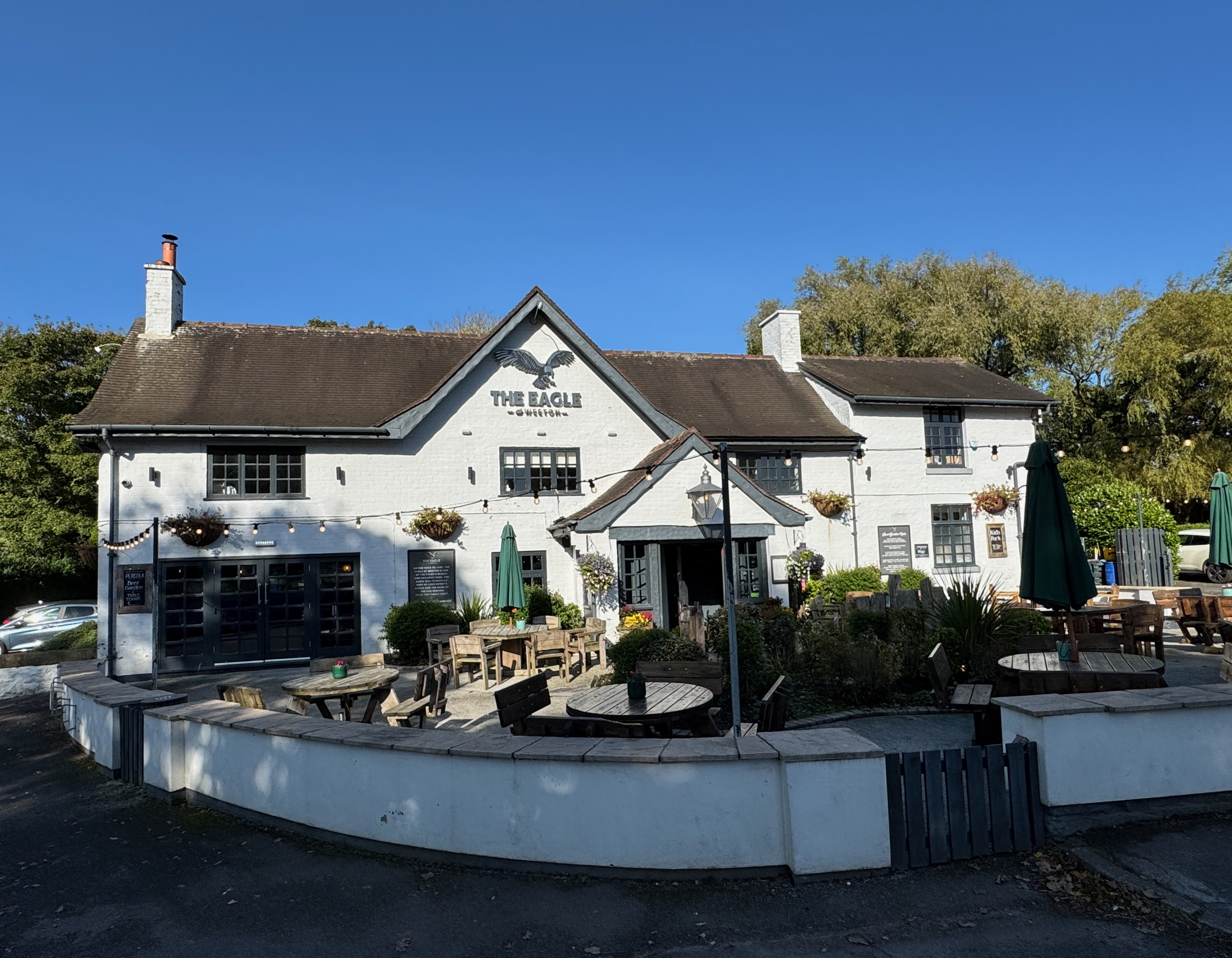
- The building in 2024
- Interactive map of the The Eagle at Weeton area
- Former names: The Holy Lamb; The Eagle and Child

General information
- Type: Public house
- Location: Singleton Road, Weeton, Lancashire, England
- Coordinates: 53.805019°N 2.936607°W
- Completed: 1585 (441 years ago)

Technical details
- Floor count: 2

Website
- eagleweeton.co.uk

The Eagle at Weeton (formerly the Eagle and Child) is a public house in Weeton, Lancashire, England. Dating to 1585, it is one of the oldest public houses in the county and in north-west England. A set of steps in front of the property date to the 18th century and are listed.

Situated on the former estate of Lord Derby, the building was once a courthouse. Judge and Puritan activist Michael Livesey, who signed the death warrant for Charles I, is believed to have presided there.

Matthew Anderton was the pub's landlord in 1851.

The pub was known as the Eagle and Child until it underwent a £750,000 renovation in 2019, at which point its name reverted to its 16th-century name, the Eagle. It has also been named The Holy Lamb. The building had a thatched roof until a fire in the 1960s.

The pub is owned by Star Pubs & Bars, a subsidiary of Heineken.

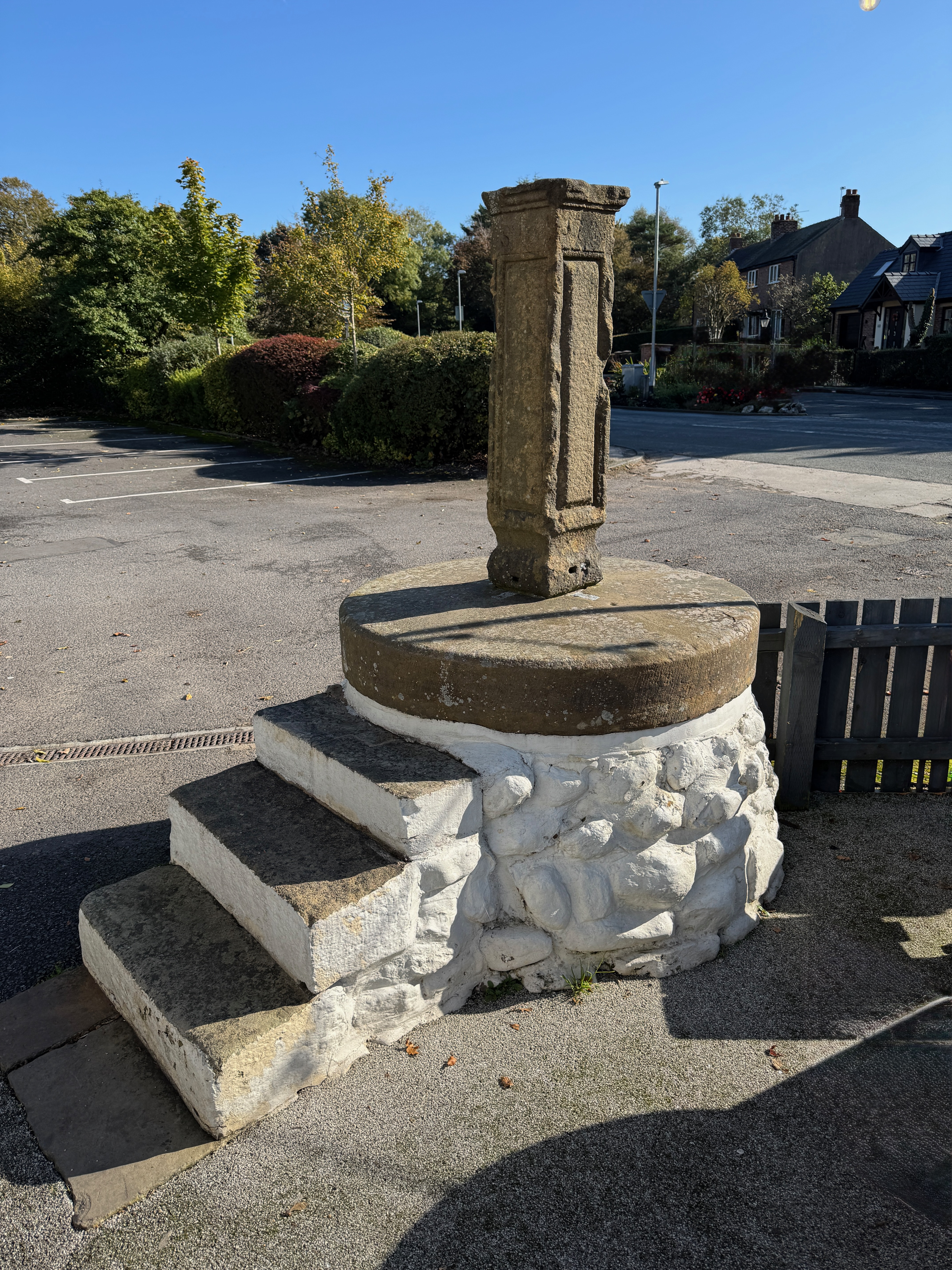
These steps in front of the building are listed

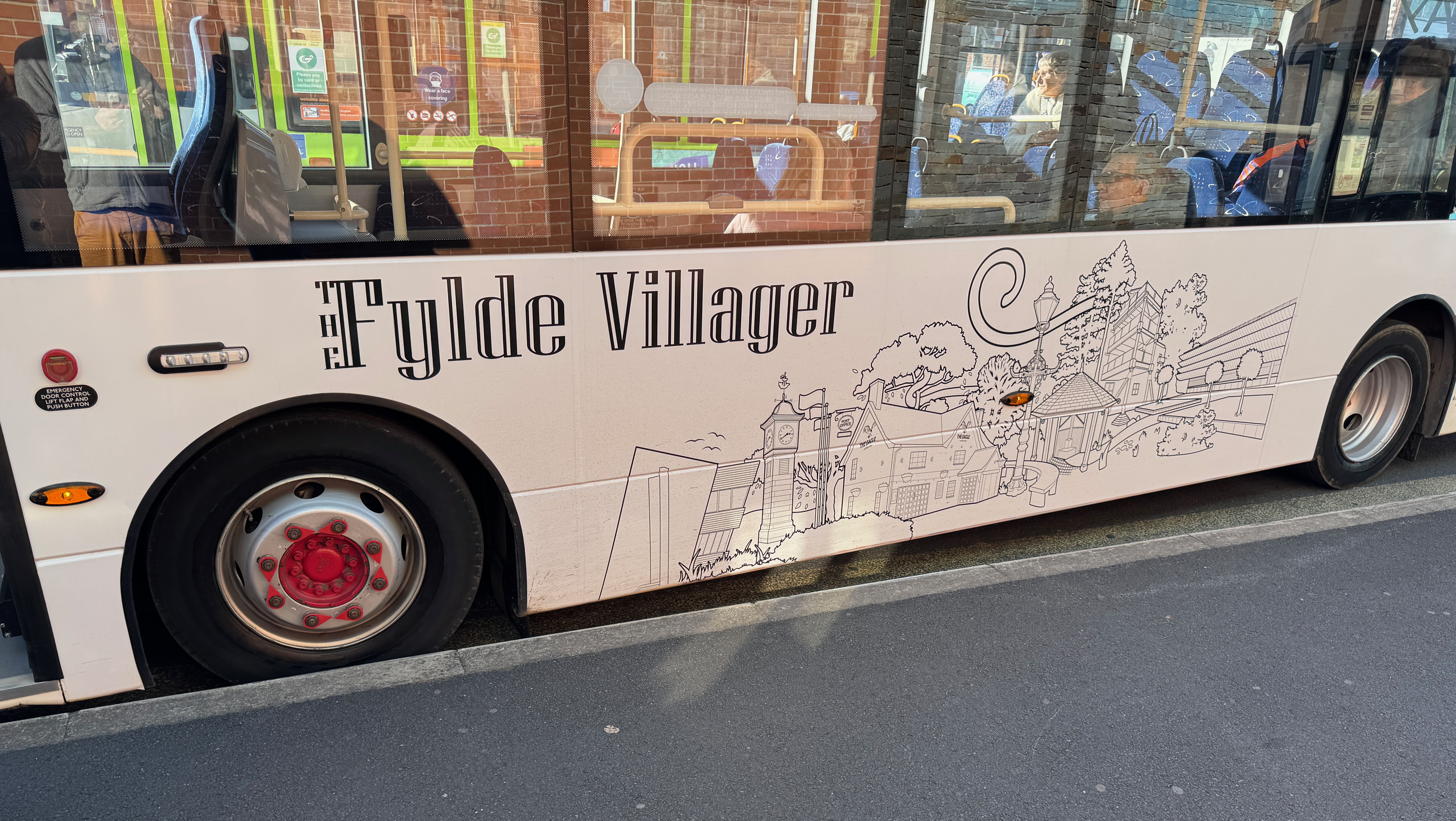
Archway Travel included the Eagle on its "Fylde Villager" livery
