= Weeton Barracks =

Military barracks in Lancashire, England

- Weeton-with-Preese
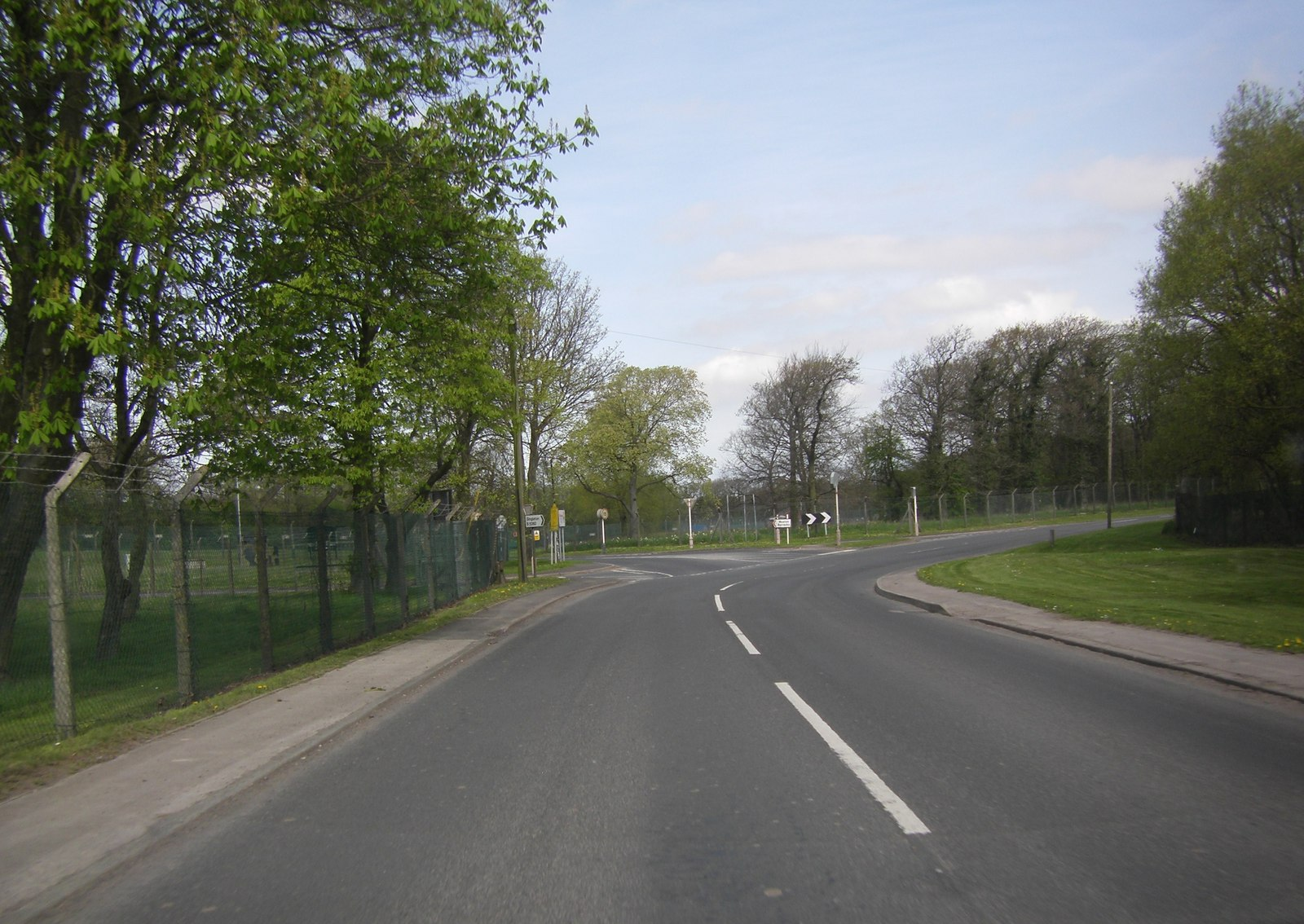
- Entrance to Weeton Barracks

Site information
- Type: Barracks
- Owner: Ministry of Defence
- Operator: British Army

Location
- Location within the Borough of Fylde
- Coordinates: 53.82009°N 2.93582°W

Site history
- Built: 1916
- Built for: War Office
- In use: 1916–present

Weeton Barracks is a military installation at Weeton-with-Preese in Lancashire, England.

== History ==
The barracks were established, using tented accommodation, as Weeton Camp in 1916 during the First World War.

The Royal Air Force also used Weeton Camp, along with RAF Squires Gate and the army camp at Kirkham, for training purposes during the Second World War. It continued to be used by the RAF, mainly for driver (MT) training, until 1965.

The barracks were significantly enhanced in the early 1960s and became the home of 1st Battalion the Lancashire Fusiliers in 1965. In 2011 it became the home of 2nd Battalion the Duke of Lancaster's Regiment after they returned from a three-year tour in Cyprus. In 2021 the 2nd Battalion the Duke of Lancaster's Regiment moved to Elizabeth Barracks at Pirbright Camp.

The barracks will become home to 1st Battalion, the Duke of Lancaster's Regiment in 2024, when it returns from being the Regional Standby Battalion in Episkopi.
