= Preston Minster =

Anglican church in Lancashire, England

- The Minster Church of St John the Evangelist
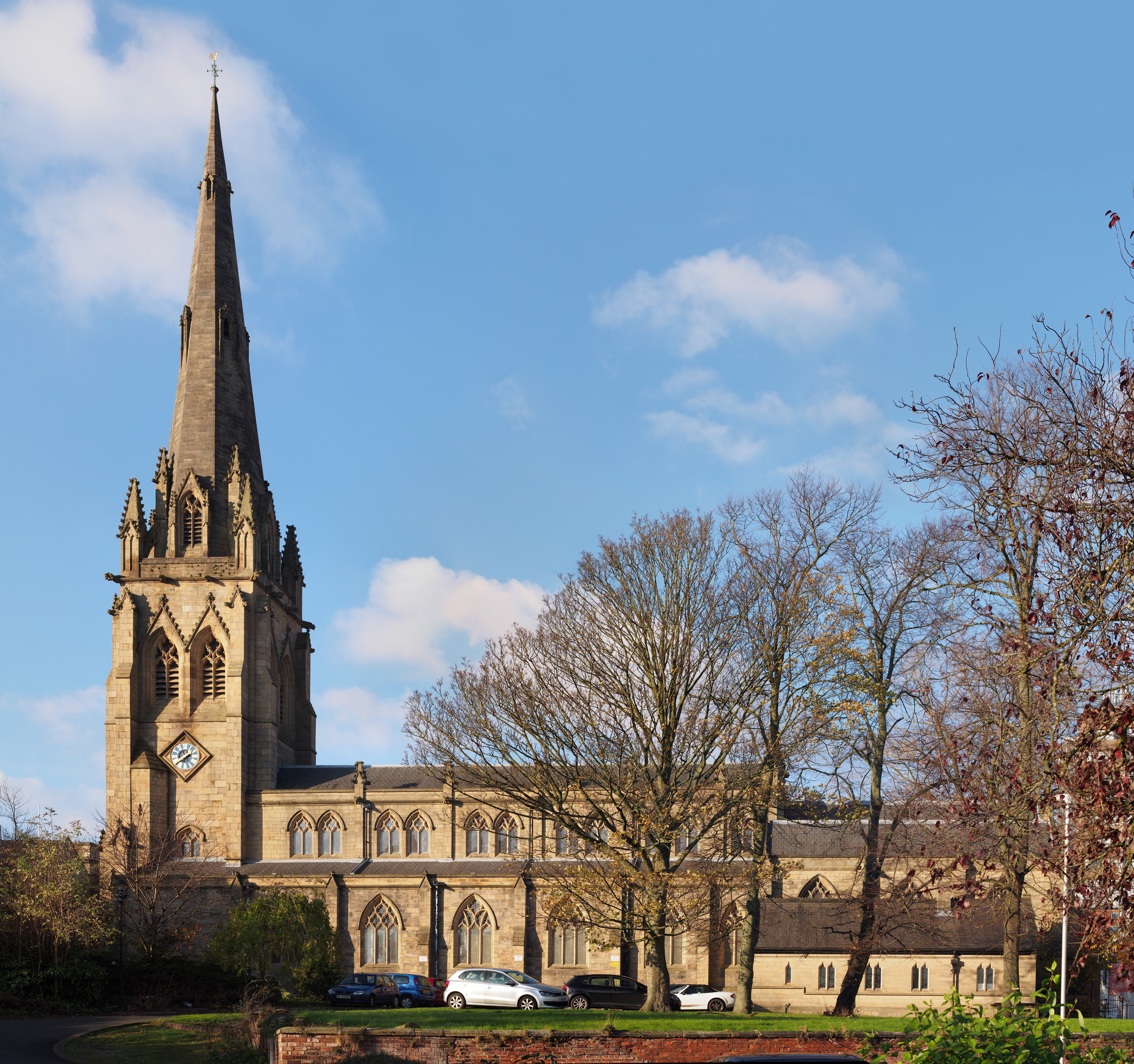
- St John's Minster from the south

- Location in Preston
- 53.7585°N 2.6962°W
- OS grid reference: SD 542 294
- Location: Church Street, Preston, Lancashire
- Country: England
- Denomination: Church of England
- Churchmanship: Charismatic Evangelical
- Website: Preston Minster

History
- Status: Parish church
- Dedication: Saint John the Evangelist
- Dedicated: 1581; 445 years ago

Architecture
- Functional status: Active
- Heritage designation: Grade II*
- Designated: 1855
- Architect: E. H. Shellard
- Architectural type: Church
- Style: Gothic Revival

Specifications
- Materials: Sandstone, slate roofs

Administration
- Province: York
- Diocese: Blackburn
- Archdeaconry: Lancaster
- Deanery: Preston
- Parish: Preston St. John and St. George The Martyr

Clergy
- Rector: Tim Roberts
- Vicar: David Owens (associate vicar)

Preston Minster, formally the Minster Church of St John the Evangelist, is in Church Street, in the centre of Preston, Lancashire, England. From its origin it has been the parish church of Preston. It is an active Anglican church in the deanery of Preston, the archdeaconry of Lancaster and the diocese of Blackburn. Its benefice is united with that of St George, Preston. St John's is recorded in the National Heritage List for England as a designated Grade II* listed building.

== History ==
St John's stands on an ancient Christian site, originally dedicated to Saint Wilfrid. The church is not specifically mentioned in the Domesday Book, the earliest documentary reference being in 1094, when it was part of a grant by Roger de Poiteau to the abbey at Sées. None of the fabric of this church has survived. It was replaced by a new church, probably in the 16th century. In 1581 its dedication was changed to Saint John the Baptist. It was repaired during the following century, but by 1770 its condition had deteriorated. In that year its dedication was changed again, this time to Saint John the Evangelist. In 1811 the tower was partly demolished, to be replaced by new tower in 1814. However, by 1853 the church was in such a bad condition that, apart from the base of the tower, the whole church was demolished.

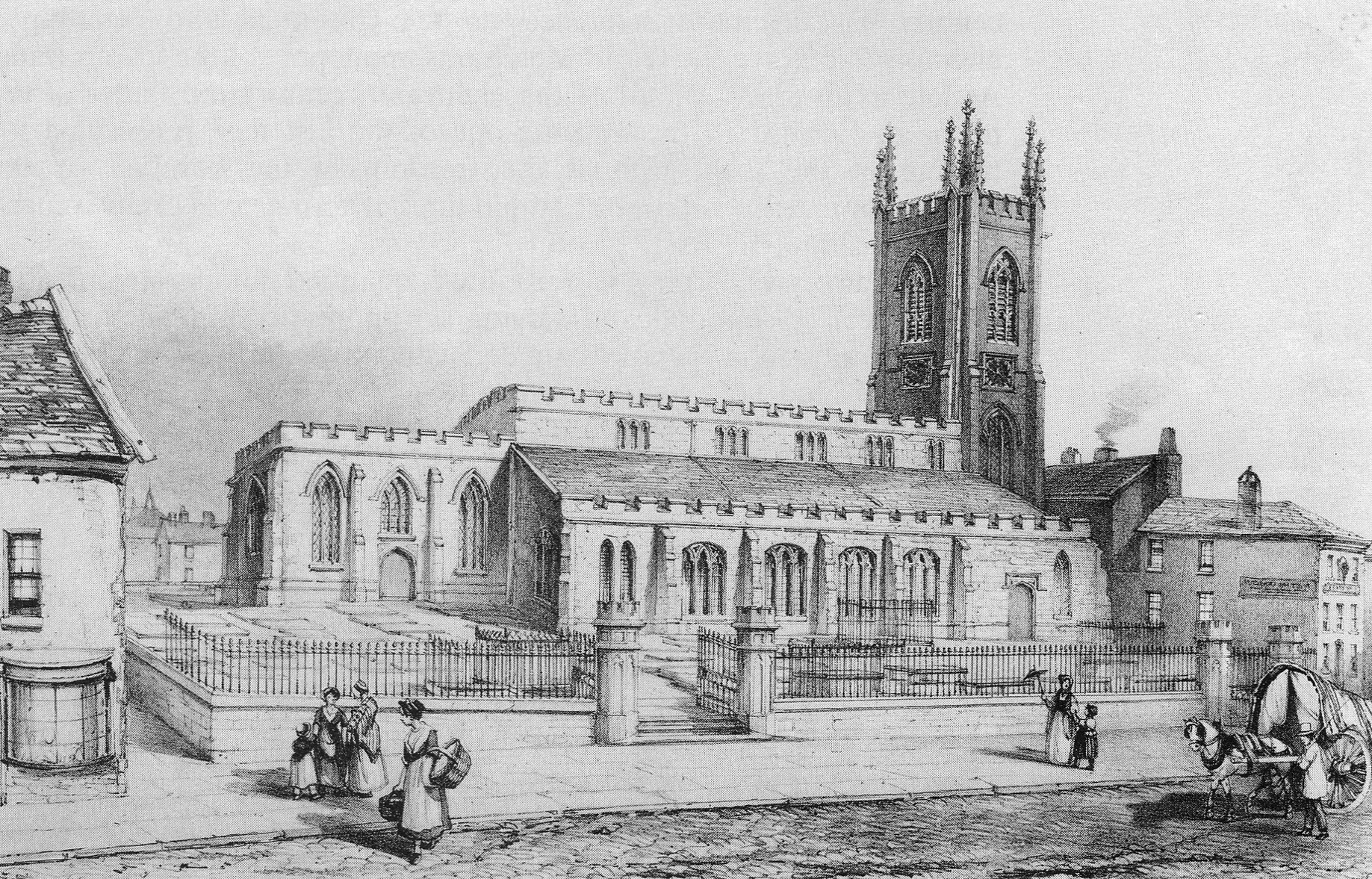
Former church of St John, demolished in 1853

The new church was built between 1853 and 1855; it was designed by E. H. Shellard, and it is considered to be his major work. In 1856 the Lancaster architect E. G. Paley designed a font and probably added groining to the tower, in 1857–58 he designed a reredos, and in 1859 the organ case. In 1930 E. G. Paley's son, Henry Paley, supervised general repairs to the church, including new ceilings in the nave, chancel and chapel, at a cost of £802. Two years later he was in charge of repairs to the tower and spire, which cost £320. North and south galleries were removed in the 1960s. The church was re-ordered in the early 2000s by Francis Roberts. To mark the granting of city status to Preston, in 2003 the church was renamed the Minster Church of Saint John.

== Architecture ==
=== Exterior ===
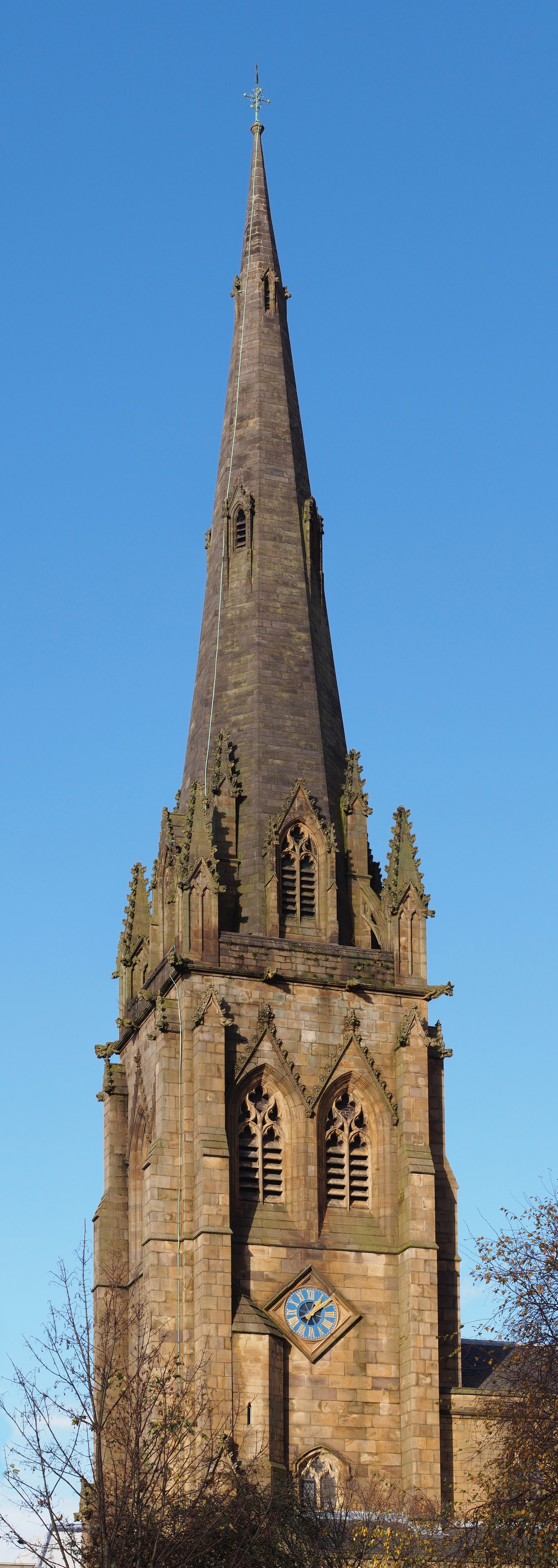
Vertical panorama of the spire

The church is constructed in sandstone ashlar with slate roofs. Its plan consists of a 5½-bay nave with a clerestory, north and south aisles, a three-bay chancel with a two-bay organ-house to the north, a three-bay chapel on the south with an attached vestry, and a west steeple with a north porch. Its architectural style is Decorated. The buttressed tower is tall and in three stages. On its west face is a small two-light window in the bottom stage, and a lancet window in the middle stage. On the north and south sides are diamond-shaped clock faces. In the top stage are two louvred bell openings on each side, each with a crocketed gablet. Above them is a cornice with gargoyles, and a parapet with corner pinnacles. The pinnacles are linked by flying buttresses to smaller pinnacles clasping the spire. The spire is tall and octagonal. At the base of the spire are two-light lucarnes with gablets, and above these are two tiers of small lucarnes. To the north of the tower is a two-storey gabled porch. In its lower storey is a doorway flanked by crocketed niches, and in the upper storey is a two-light window flanked by blind windows.

Along the sides of the clerestory are buttresses rising to pinnacles, each bay containing a pair of two-light windows, with a single-light window in the half bay. At the east end is a pair of octagonal pinnacles. Along the sides of the aisles are buttresses rising to gablets, and each bay contains a large three-light window. At the east end of the chancel are diagonal buttresses rising to pinnacles. The east window is large with five lights. On the north side of the chancel is a three-light window, and a parapet with open zig-zag work. The organ house has three-light windows on its north side, a large four-light window on the east side, and corner pinnacles. The features of the south chapel are similar. The vestry has a west door, a three-light east window and coupled lancets on its side.

=== Interior ===
The arcades in both the nave and chancel are carried on quatrefoil piers. Both the nave and chancel have hammerbeam roofs. At the west end of the church is a gallery supported by timber piers. The altar is by Francis Roberts, and it incorporates the base of an older pulpit. The east end of the north aisle forms a regimental chapel, and is separated from the rest of the aisle by iron screens decorated with red roses; it dates from the later part of the 20th century and was made by Trapp Forge. On the west wall of the church is a large painting of the Sermon on the Mount executed in 1956 by Hans Feibusch. In the baptistry is a painting dated 2003 by George Melling. The church includes a notable stained-glass artwork by Brian Clarke, a memorial window commissioned by the Preston Guild to commemorate its 1972 Guild Year and as a tribute to Alderman Fred Gray, was designed 1973–74 and installed in the latter part of 1974. The three-light window is notable for featuring one of the earliest uses of silkscreen-printing onto mouth-blown glass, and possibly its first expression in the United Kingdom, incorporating photographic passages including a street scene from the 1972 Preston Guild processions. The church is also appointed with windows by William Wailes, dating from the 1850s and, under the tower, a window by Lancastrian firm Shrigley and Hunt dated 1907.

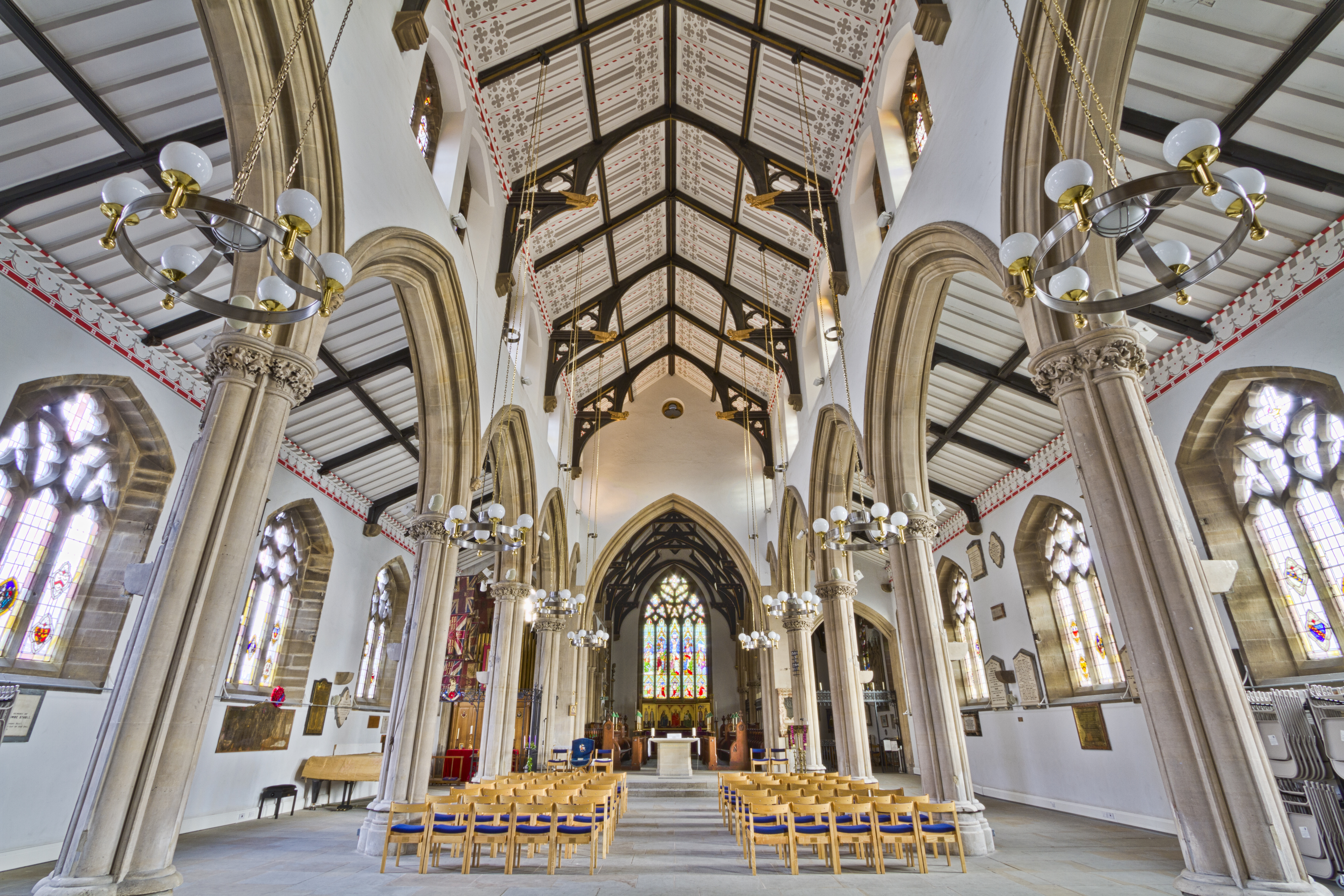
Inside the church

The earliest memorial is a brass dated 1623. Elsewhere there are memorials to members of the Hoghton family, and in the tower is the tomb-recess of Thomas Starkie Shuttleworth who died in 1819. There is also a wall monument by J. Theakston to Revd Roger Carus Wilson, who died in 1839, carved with reliefs of the five Preston churches built during his incumbency. The three-manual organ, dating from 1864, was rebuilt in 1872 by Gray and Davison. In 1889 it was rebuilt by William Hill and Son and moved from its position in the west gallery to the north of the chancel. The organ was rebuilt in 1965 by Hill, Norman & Beard, and repairs were carried out by Harrison & Harrison in 1972. In 1989 David Wells carried out a comprehensive rebuilding.

The tower contains twelve bells cast by the Whitechapel Bell Foundry. The heaviest eight were cast in 1920 for Holy Trinity, Bolton. These were transferred to Preston in 1997 with the addition of two trebles. Two further trebles were added in 2003. The original ring of six bells, cast by Thomas Mears II in 1814 and Mears & Stainbank in 1934, were removed from the tower and later installed at Southminster Presbyterian Church, Pittsburgh, Pennsylvania, in the United States, where they now form a ring of eight.

== External features ==
The gates to the churchyard and the gates are listed at Grade II. They date from about 1855 and were probably designed by Shellard.

== See also ==
- Grade II* listed buildings in Lancashire
- Listed buildings in Preston, Lancashire
- List of works by E. H. Shellard
