= Helen Bradley =

English artist (1900–1979)

Helen Bradley MBE
- Born: Helen Layfield; 20 November 1900; Lees, Lancashire, United Kingdom
- Died: 19 July 1979 (aged 78); Macclesfield, Cheshire, England
- Known for: Painting
- Awards: MBE

Helen Layfield Bradley MBE (20 November 1900 – 19 July 1979) was an English artist born in Lees, Lancashire, England. Her paintings, mostly in oils, typically depict life in Lancashire in the Edwardian era.

== Biography ==
She was born Helen Layfield at 58 High Street, Lees, a village on the outskirts of Oldham, Lancashire.

She was educated at Clarksfield School, and from age thirteen at Oldham Art School, having won the John Platt scholarship. Despite this, she did not begin to paint seriously until she was in her sixties. In the 1960s she met fellow painter L. S. Lowry who encouraged her in the creation of a narrative style based on her own childhood memories. From 1965 she became as popular in the United States as in the United Kingdom and her paintings now sell at auction for tens of thousands of pounds.

Many of her paintings feature a character called "Miss Carter", a woman who always wore pink.

In 1971 Jonathan Cape published the first of four books And Miss Carter Wore Pink: Scenes from an Edwardian Childhood, which was an instant success. Editions were then published in German, French, Dutch and Japanese, and a special edition produced for the US. The series, illustrated with Bradley's naive paintings, topped the bestseller lists in the early 1970s. Bradley appeared on a number of television chat shows of the 1970s, including Pebble Mill at One and the Russell Harty Show. In July 1975 she was a guest on BBC Radio 4's Desert Island Discs. The BBC and the NBC network made documentaries about her life and the Northern Ballet adapted her work for the stage, with live narration by actress Pat Phoenix.

In the 1978 Birthday Honours she was appointed a Member of the Order of the British Empire (MBE), but died at her home, 2 Green Villa Park, Wilmslow, Cheshire, on 19 July 1979, before her investiture.

Her works are in several public collections, including those of the Yale Center for British Art, Salford Museum and Art Gallery, and the Saddleworth Museum, with several at Gallery Oldham. The gallery also has a bust of Bradley. Her portrait in oils, painted circa 1975 by C. Harrison, is in a private collection.

In May 2013 Bradley's Going for a Walk Before Bedtime sold at auction, at Bonhams of London, for £37,250. Two of her paintings, one in oil and one in watercolour, featured in an October 2019 episode of the BBC Television programme Antiques Roadshow. Expert assessor Rupert Maas commented on the "wit and levity" in her work, and compared her to the American naive painter Grandma Moses.

== Bibliography ==
- And Miss Carter Wore Pink: Scenes from an Edwardian Childhood. Jonathan Cape. 1971. ISBN 978-0224005814.
- Miss Carter Came with Us. Jonathan Cape. 1973. ISBN 978-0224008914.
- 'In the beginning,' said Great-Aunt Jane. Jonathan Cape. 1975. ISBN 978-0224011495.
- The Queen Who Came to Tea. Jonathan Cape. 1978. ISBN 978-0224015455.
