= Weeton-with-Preese =

Civil parish in Lancashire, England

Coordinates: 53.805°N 2.937°W

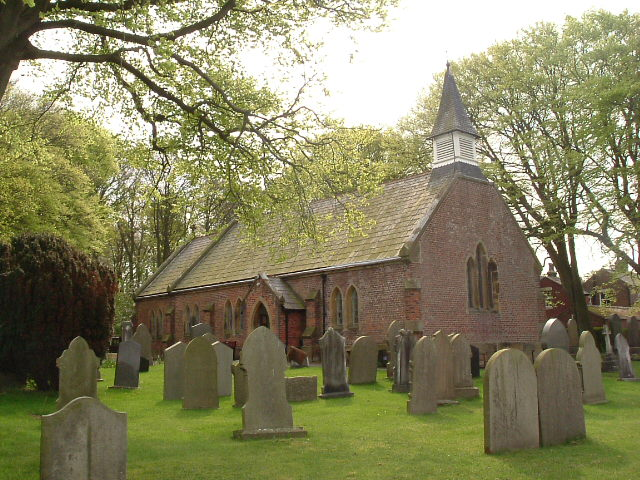
- St Michael's Church

- Shown within Fylde Borough Shown on the Fylde Location within Lancashire
- Population: 911 (2021)
- OS grid reference: SD3834
- Civil parish: Weeton-with-Preese
- District: Fylde
- Shire county: Lancashire
- Region: North West
- Country: England
- Sovereign state: United Kingdom
- Post town: PRESTON
- Postcode district: PR4
- Post town: BLACKPOOL
- Postcode district: FY3, FY4
- Dialling code: 01253
- Police: Lancashire
- Fire: Lancashire
- Ambulance: North West
- UK Parliament: Fylde

Weeton-with-Preese is a civil parish in the Borough of Fylde in Lancashire, England, beside the Blackpool to Preston railway line and the M55 motorway, just east of Blackpool and 3.5 miles (5.6 km) north west of Kirkham. It contains the village of Weeton.

== Geography and administration ==
Weeton is in the Fylde parliamentary constituency and the Staining and Weeton electoral ward. The area is mostly rural.

The parish covers an area of 2,876 acres (1,164 ha) east of Blackpool, and in 2001 had a population of 1,096, decreasing to 656 at the 2011 census. However in the 2021 Cenus went up to 911. Preese — which has recognition in the official name — has no separate measurement while Mythop (or less commonly Mythorp) has its area recorded as 677 acres (274 ha). Mythop, not recognised in the parish name, is divided from Weeton by mossland and by the Preston to Blackpool railway line.

In the east, Weeton occupies most of the southern half of the parish, with Mythop in the south western corner, the northern half containing Preese on the west and Swarbrick on the east. Watson argues that these sub-manors — each with its own hall — may be based on the ancient pre-Conquest quarterland divisions characteristic of the Irish Sea cultural basin of Celtic North Wales and the Isle of Man. Each of the four manors occupies an area of slightly higher ground, each divided from the others by depressions: Weeton is 112 feet (34 m) above sea level, Swarbrick and Preese 100 feet (30 m) and Mythop 50 feet (15 m).

In an unpublished article, Watson (1994) "chases the shadows left on the ground" by suggesting that "the Manx Balla or Treen and the Welsh Tref offer a model for the Lancastrian township with its fourfold manorial division of approximately five thousand acres of land". Although the modern day Weeton with Preese is just over half this size, Watson argues that "the documentary facts support the still discernible evidence of the quarterland skeletal frame of the townships surviving from the days of the comital estates. The evidence is further bolstered by the existence of four principal houses in most of the lowland and non-vaccary townships in the Amounderness Hundred".

A road from Kirkham goes west and then north to Weeton and through Swarbrick to Singleton. From Weeton a road goes west through Mythop to Marton and Blackpool, another east to Greenhalgh and another south to Great Plumpton. The railway branch line to Blackpool crosses the south-west corner, cutting beneath the Mythop Road, south-east of Westfield Cottages.

== History ==
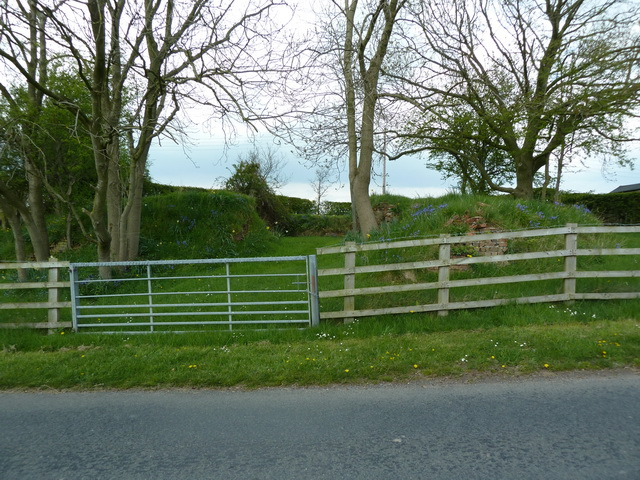
Remains of Weeton Windmill

The place-name Weeton — first recorded in the Domesday Book as Widetun — derives from the Old English wiðig (willow) and -tūn (settlement). The village presumably derived its name from the presence of indigenous or farmed willow trees. To this day, there are fine specimens of willow trees in Weeton.

After 1066 the lordship of Weeton passed from the Northumbrian Earl Tostig to the Norman warlord Roger of Poitou. Weeton’s value at this time was assessed at "two carucates" (an area of arable land that could be worked in one day by two ploughteams).

Some time after the Domesday survey, the lordship of Weeton passed to the Butler family, early lords of the Amounderness Hundred, who in 1328 became the Earls of Ormonde. In the fourteenth century the Butlers owned extensive lands, mills and fisheries in the manors of Weeton, Little Marton, Treales, Wesham, Mowbreck, Greenhalgh, Thistleton, Out Rawcliffe, Bradkirk, Medlar and Esprick.

The manors of Weeton, Preese, Mythop and Swarbrick were acquired by Sir Thomas Stanley of Lathom, later the first Earl of Derby, in 1400. They continued as part of the family estate until 1955. In the nineteenth century, the Earl of Derby commonly used the title "Baron of Weeton". The title is no longer used and although there is evidence it may also have been used by Theobald Walter in the twelfth century, Weeton's status as a barony was it seems always a matter of dispute.

Preese Hall was the ancient seat of the Prees family. On the death of Margery de Prees, about 1401, it passed to her nephew, Edmund Skillicorne and it remained in the Skillicorne family until about 1612 when the manor was sold.

By 1522, the estate had expanded to include the manors of Treales, Wesham, Out Rawcliffe, Little Marton, Greenhalgh, Plumpton and other lands. On 4 October 1637, William, 6th Earl of Derby, surrendered to James, Lord Strange, the manor of Weeton and various other ones, to enable him to make leases.

In 1670, a charter from Charles II granted Weeton an annual fair for the sale of cattle and small wares to take place on the Tuesday and Wednesday following Trinity Sunday. Tolls were to be paid to the Earl of Derby and are recorded in the Bailif's Accounts for the manor from 1682 (they amounted to £4 12s in that year). During the seventeenth century, a weekly fair also took place in the parish. The Trinity fair began to falter in the 1920s as local cattle-farmers sought richer markets for their stock. The fair was eventually reduced to a huddle of bring-and-buy stalls on the triangular "goose green" at the centre of the village, and was eventually replaced by the annual Gala.

The village also had a windmill, Weeton Windmill, which was built in 1812. It fell into disrepair and was demolished in the 1950s.

One of the most notable local families were the Jollys of Mythop who dominated village life for more than three hundred years. Members of the family were largely responsible for the draining of Marton Mere in the eighteenth century. Their most renowned son was Edward Jolly (1664–1738) declared Master of Mythop in 1715, for his exploits in the Battle of Preston (known colloquially as the Preston Fight). The family was also related to Major James Jolly, Oliver Cromwell's Provost-Marshal General for Lancashire, and Thomas Jolly, founder of Congregationalism.

== Modern day village ==
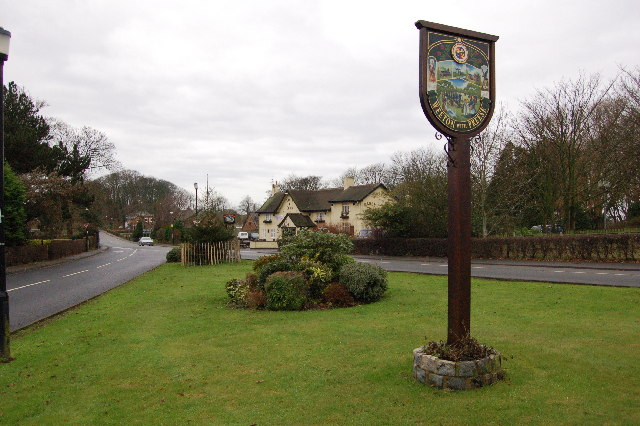
The village green, with the Eagle and Child (now the Eagle at Weeton) pub in the background, 2005

The Church of St. Michael was founded in 1843 and has a number of historic gravestones in the graveyard, including many relating to the Jolly family.

Adjacent to the church is the primary school, Weeton St. Michael's Church of England Junior School. Each year the village hosts the Weeton Gala.

The one public house in the village, the Eagle at Weeton (previously the Eagle and Child), dates back to 1585 and takes its name from the family crest of local landowner Lord Derby. It is claimed to be one of the Fylde's oldest pubs. The mounting steps at the front of the inn date from 1755 and it is believed that Oliver Cromwell stayed at the premises.

In October 2007 one of the largest sales in the region for some time of Holstein cattle took place at Preese Hall Farm with the first sale to disperse the milking portion of the Loftus family's noted old established Weeton herd. Cuadrilla Resources conducted the first hydraulic fracturing trial in the United Kingdom to produce shale gas nearby at Preese Hall, starting in 2011. In 2022 Preese Hall became the home of Black Powder Gin.

== Transport ==
The villages transport is run by Archway travel on 2 routes. The 75 to Fleetwood or Preston and the 76 to St. Anne’s via Kirkham or Blackpool.

== Sport ==
The second stage of the Tour of Britain Women's cycle race passed through Weeton in 2026.

== Weeton Barracks ==
One mile from the village centre are Weeton Barracks. There was also a RAF base nearby during the World Wars. Royal Air Force Weeton continued long after the Second World War, throughout the years of National Service, until the army took over the base in the late 1950s or early 1960s. It was the RAF's MT (Motor Transport) training school for drivers and technicians—the huge Queen Mary aircraft transporters, with 'L' plates, were a common site in the lanes around Weeton.

Across the road from RAF Weeton was a separate RAF unit, RAF Hospital Weeton, the main RAF Hospital for the north of England. The two were wholly separate administrative and operational units. The site of the hospital has been a derelict waste ground for many years, with just the old concrete turning circle for ambulances visible in the scrub, opposite the main gate of the barracks.

== Notable people ==
- Bob Birket (1874–1933), former professional footballer, was born in Weeton in 1876 and spent his entire career at Blackpool F.C.
- Edward Jolly (1664–1738), Master of Mythop and hero of the 1715 Preston Rebellion, was from Mythop.
- William Barrow (alias Waring, alias Harcourt) was born at Weeton in 1609. In 1632 he was ordained as a Jesuit priest. In May 1678 he was arrested and sent to Newgate, for what became known as the Titus Oates plot. He was tried with four others for conspiring to kill king Charles II of England. He was condemned to death and was hung drawn and quartered at Tyburn on 20 June 1679. There is a window dedicated in his name in St Anne's church at Westby-with-Plumptons.

== See also ==
- Listed buildings in Weeton-with-Preese
