= Lees, Greater Manchester =

Town in Greater Manchester, England

Coordinates: 53.538°N 2.069°W

Lees
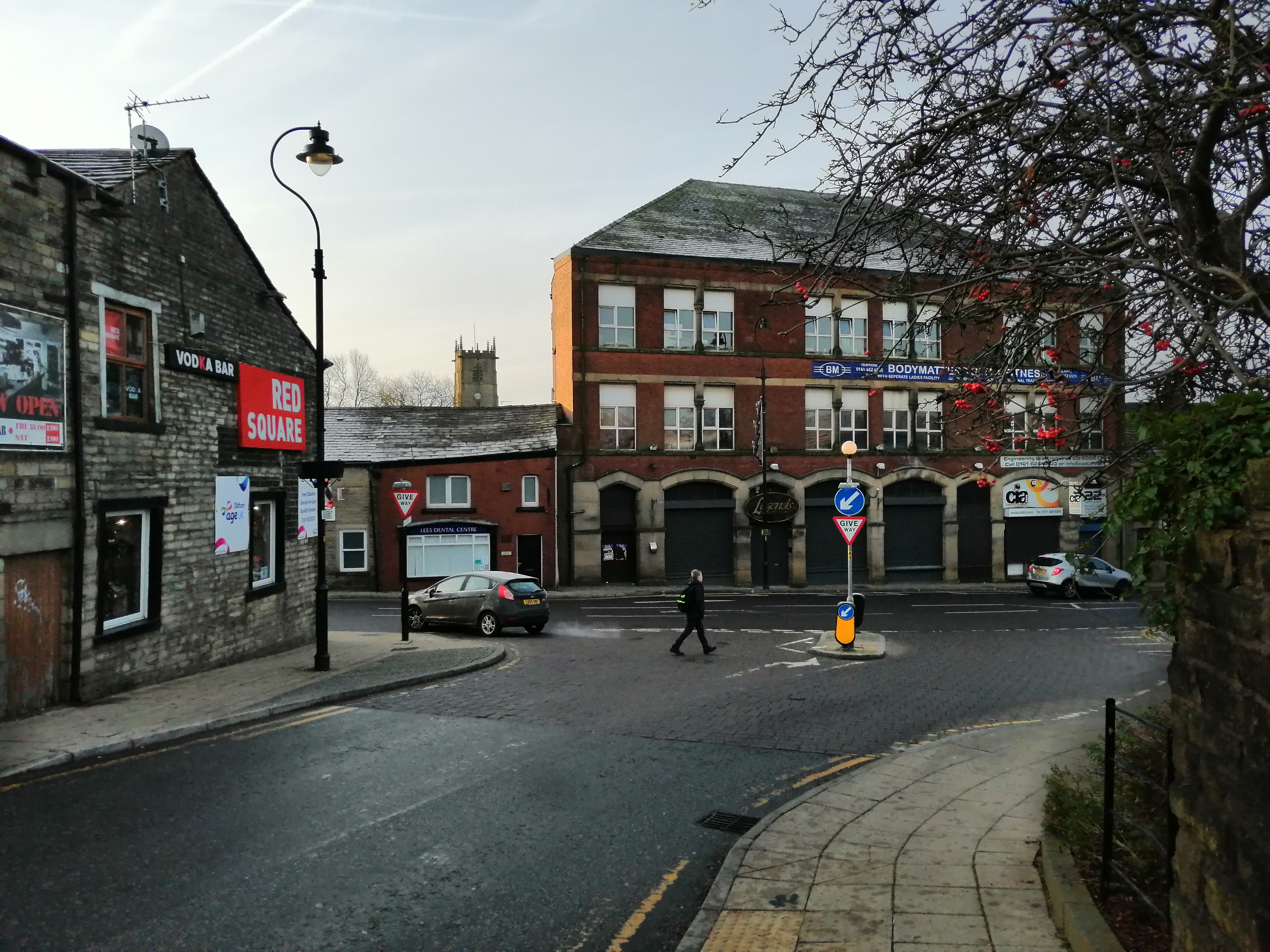
- Lees village centre

- Location within Greater Manchester
- Population: 4,500 (2011 Census)
- OS grid reference: SD955045
- Metropolitan borough: Oldham
- Metropolitan county: Greater Manchester
- Region: North West
- Country: England
- Sovereign state: United Kingdom
- Post town: OLDHAM
- Postcode district: OL4
- Dialling code: 0161
- Police: Greater Manchester
- Fire: Greater Manchester
- Ambulance: North West
- UK Parliament: Oldham East and Saddleworth

Lees is a town in the Metropolitan Borough of Oldham, Greater Manchester, England, amongst the Pennines east of the River Medlock, 1.8 miles (2.9 km) east of Oldham, and 8.2 miles (13.2 km) northeast of Manchester.

In the 14th century, when John de Leghes was a retainer of the local Lord of the manor, Lees was a conglomeration of hamlets, ecclesiastically linked with the township of Ashton-under-Lyne. Farming was the main industry of this rural area, with locals supplementing their incomes by hand-loom weaving in the domestic system. At the beginning of the 19th century, Lees had obtained a reputation for its mineral springs; ambitions to develop a spa town were thwarted by an unplanned process of urbanisation caused by the rise of textile manufacture during the Industrial Revolution.

Lees expanded into a mill town in the late 19th century, on the back of neighbouring Oldham's boom in cotton spinning. Lees Urban District had eleven cotton mills at its manufacturing zenith.

== History ==
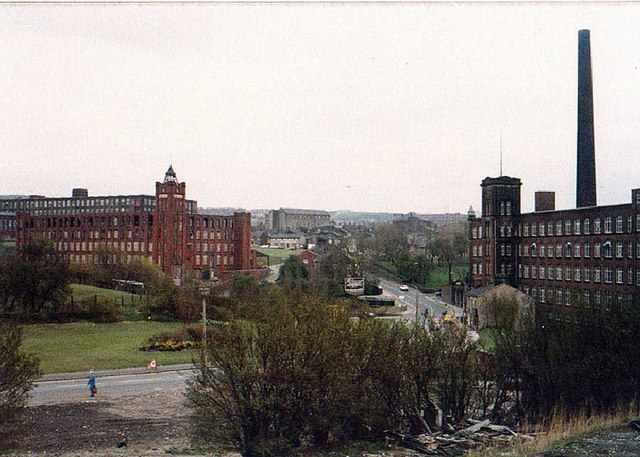
The Industrial Revolution brought cotton spinning to Lees in the form of eleven textile mills, changing the character of the village completely.

The settlement dates back to the 14th century and is thought to have been named after former retainer of the manor, John de Leghes.

Lees was one of the localities which, on 16 August 1819, sent a contingent of parishioners to the mass public demonstration at Manchester, now known as the Peterloo massacre. In the week before Peterloo (an assembly demanding the reform of parliamentary representation), weavers in Lees had paraded through the village with a large black flag adorned with the slogans "no Borough Mongering, Taxation Without Representation is Unject and Tyrannical," and "Unite and be Free, Equal Representation or Death". The growing unrest in the village prompted one alarmed inhabitant to write to the Home Office.

In the late 18th century, a natural chalybeate spring was discovered in the locality, and by the early 19th century the village gained a reputation for these "fashionable" mineral springs. In the early 19th century, water from Lees Spa, had become fashionable to drink, so much so, that it was bottled and sold around the country. In the month of August 1821, 60,000 people visited Lees Spa. Ambitions to develop Lees into a spa town – "Lancashire's very own Harrogate" – were thwarted by an unplanned process of urbanisation caused by introduction and profitability of textile manufacture during the Industrial Revolution. The Industrial Revolution brought cotton spinning to Lees in the form of eleven mills, which by the late 19th century, had changed the character of the village completely.

Springhead-born Annie Kenney, one of the first suffragettes to be imprisoned worked at Lees's Leesbrook Mill. Annie's younger, Lees-born sister Jessie Kenney was also a campaigner for women's suffrage in the United Kingdom. By the age of 21 Jessie was the Women's Social and Political Union's youngest organiser.

Lees has grown in size in terms of both amenities and residential population, in its role as a commuter village for people working in Oldham and West Yorkshire. It is home to commercial and distribution companies. The main street is notable for the number of public houses in close proximity.

== Religion ==
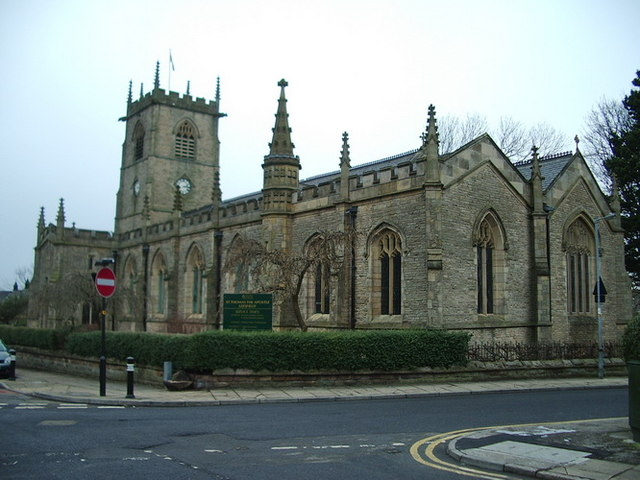
St Thomas the Apostle church

The Church of St Thomas, on West Street, Leesfield, lies within the Archdeaconry of Rochdale, the Deanery of Oldham East, and the benefice of Leesfield, St Thomas. It is a Grade II* listed building. The Priest in Charge is Revd Edith Disley, assisted by Revd Ruth Farrar. The church was founded in 1846 and completed in 1848.

The church has a Sunday school and hosts meetings of the Mothers Union, Rainbows, Brownies, Guides, Beavers, and Scouts. It also has an active group of bell ringers. The church can accommodate 600 people. Four of its stained glass windows are by the Belgian artist Jean-Baptiste Capronnier.

The Roman Catholic church is St Edward's, on Spring Lane. The parish priest is Father Callum Brown and he is assisted by Pastor Emiratus Father John Marsland, who celebrated 50 years since his ordination in 2022. The parish was founded on 1 April 1872.

The parish also has a Christian Brethren Congregation and a Zion Methodist Chapel.

== Governance ==
Lees (or Hey) was within the Knott Lanes division of the parish and township of Ashton-under-Lyne, and hundred of Salford. In 1859 a Local Board of Health (at first known as Lees-with-Crossbank, subsequently as Lees) was established for the Lees area. This area was in the Ashton-under-Lyne poor law union.

Between 1894 and 1974, Lees constituted the Lees Urban District, in the administrative county of Lancashire; the Local Board became the Lees Urban District Council. As the district was situated entirely between the County Borough of Oldham and the West Riding of Yorkshire, it constituted an exclave of the administrative county of Lancashire. In 1911 part of the urban district was added to the civil parish of Crossbank, but in 1914 Crossbank was absorbed into the Lees Urban District.

In 1974 the Lees Urban District was amalgamated with six other local government districts, to form the newly created Metropolitan Borough of Oldham within the metropolitan county of Greater Manchester.

The Saddleworth and Lees area committee meets regularly to discuss the progress of the villages.

== Geography ==
The village consists of a small cluster of shops and businesses on either side of the A669 Lees High Street, surrounded by some terraced houses, cottages and some small estates. Lees is separated from the main conurbation of Oldham by a small amount of green belt land in the valley of Leesbrook, on either bank of the River Medlock.

A part of Lees is known locally as County End; Springhead in Saddleworth forms a contiguous urban area with Lees, though the border between the two forms part of the ancient county boundary between Lancashire and the West Riding of Yorkshire. Crossbank is an area of Lees.

== Transport ==
Lees is accessed on the roads on the A669 from Saddleworth and Oldham. Along this road, there are buses running towards Oldham and Manchester on First Greater Manchester's 84, 180 and 184 services. Other destinations which can be reached from Lees on the bus are Huddersfield, Hyde, Middleton, Mossley, Saddleworth and Stalybridge.

Lees railway station closed in 1955, followed by the complete closure of the line in 1964. There was also a small engine shed east of the station.

== Notable people ==
Notable people associated with Lees include:

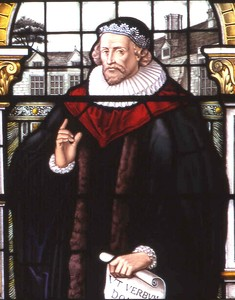
Laurence Chaderton

- Laurence Chaderton (1536–1640), English Puritan divine, one of the original translators of the King James Version of the Bible
- John Higson (1825–1871), English antiquarian and topographer.
- Arthur Lees (born 1874), a rugby union and rugby league footballer, playing 356 games for Oldham R.L.F.C.
- Helen Bradley (1900–1979), English artist; her paintings, mostly in oils, depict life in Lancashire in the Edwardian era
- Phil Woolas (1959–2026), former MP for Oldham East and Saddleworth, 1997 to 2010 lived in the locality whilst an MP
- Victoria Bateman (born 1979), British feminist campaigner, economist and academic, specialises in economic history

=== and ===
Nell Kenney (1876–1953), Annie Kenney (1879–1953), Kitty Kenney (1880–1952), Jenny Kenney (1884–1961) and Jessie Kenney (1887–1985) - three of the five sisters were born locally. They became activists and suffragettes for the Women's Social and Political Union (WSPU).

== See also ==
- Listed buildings in Lees, Greater Manchester

== Gallery ==
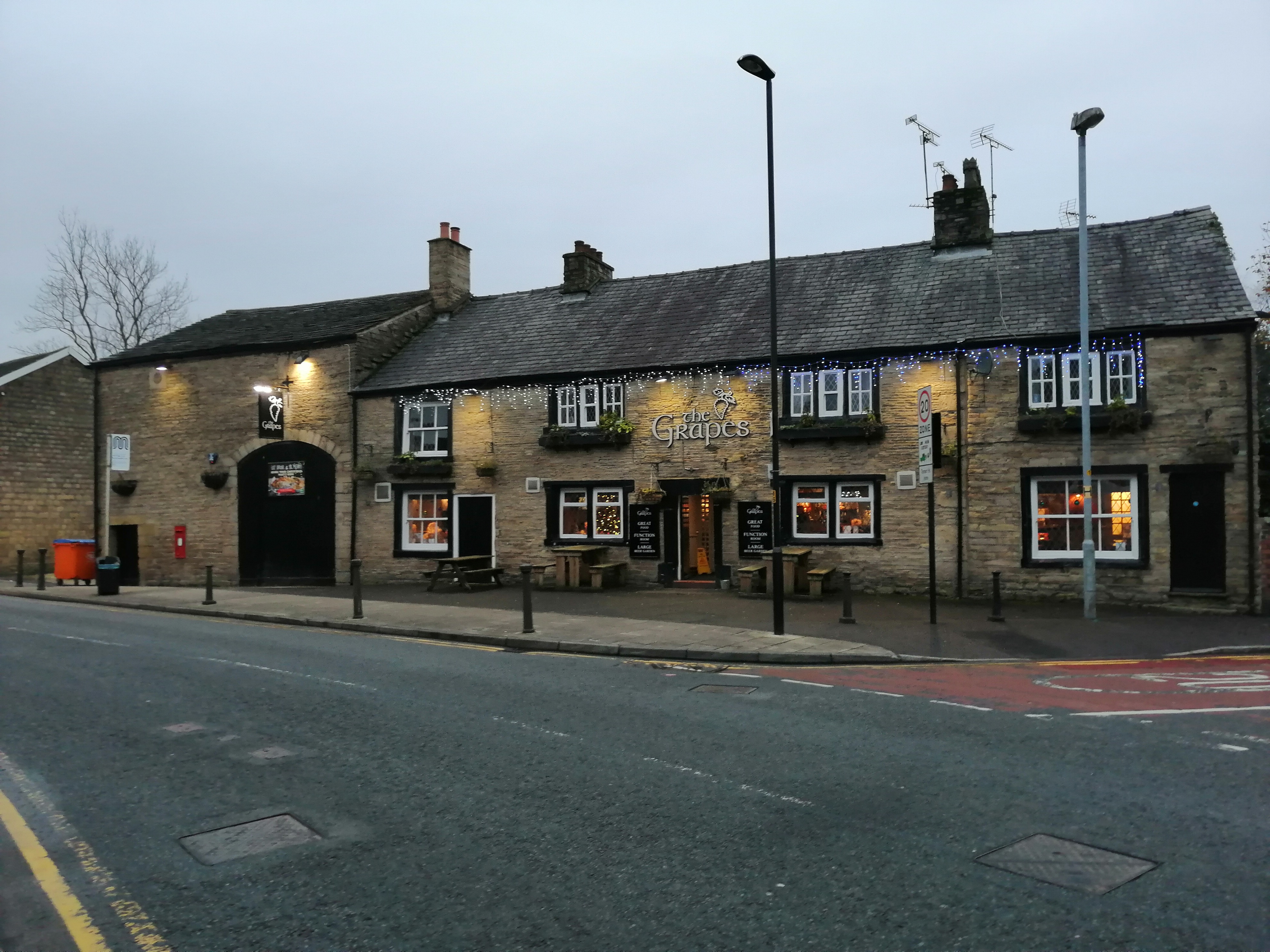
The Grapes pub, built in 1741.

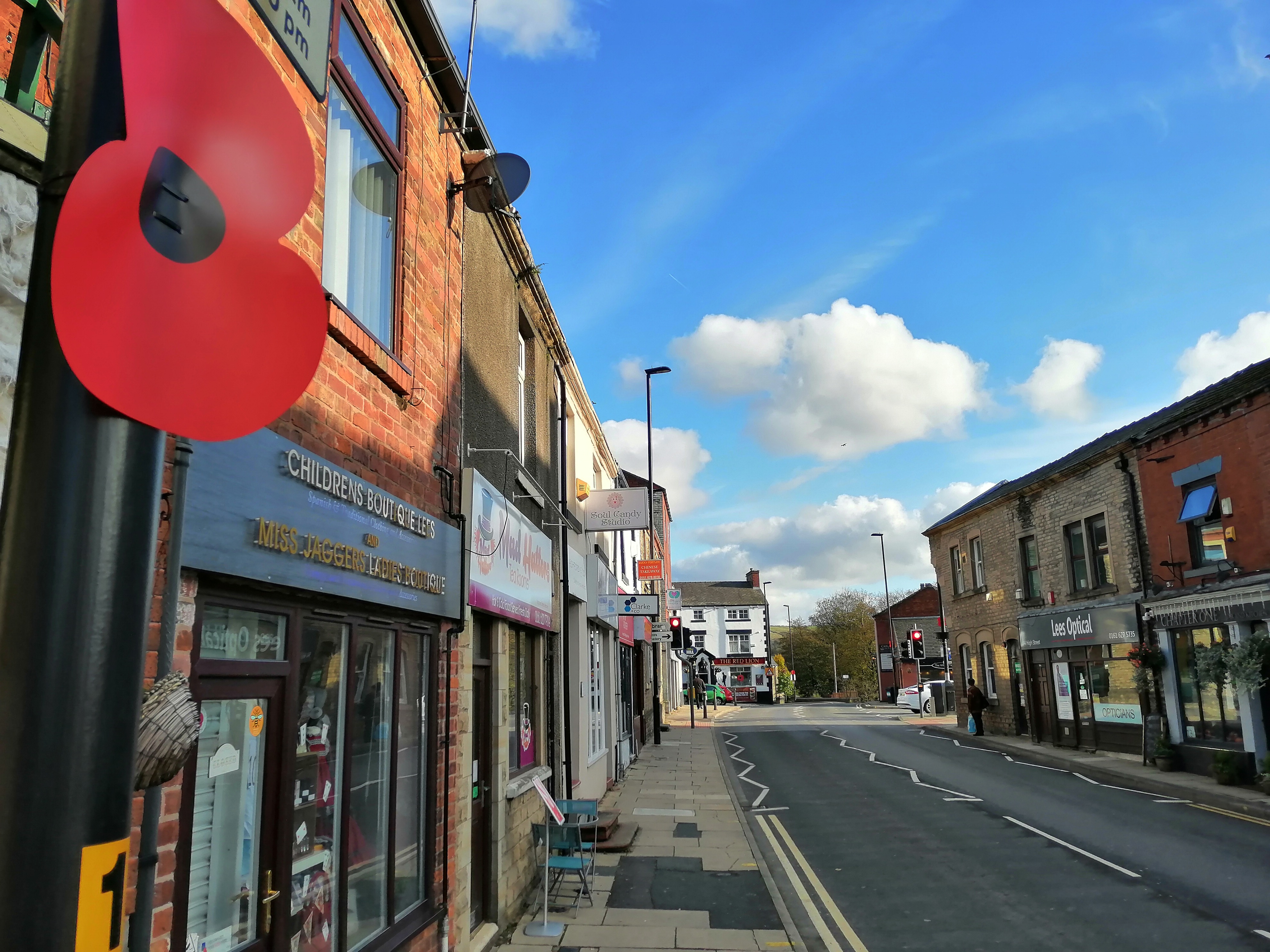
Poppy on a lamppost on Lees High Street

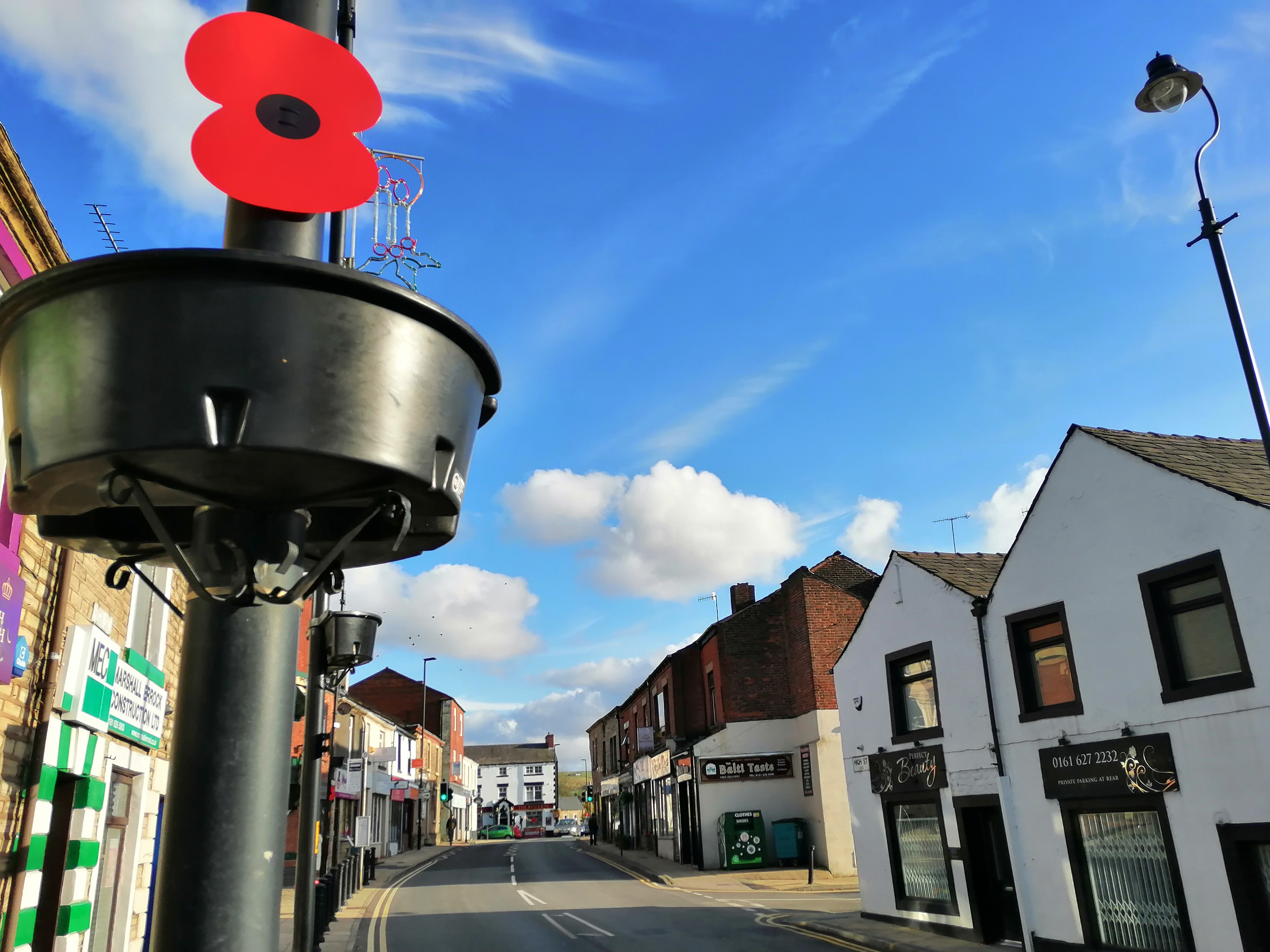
Lamppost with a poppy on the High Street

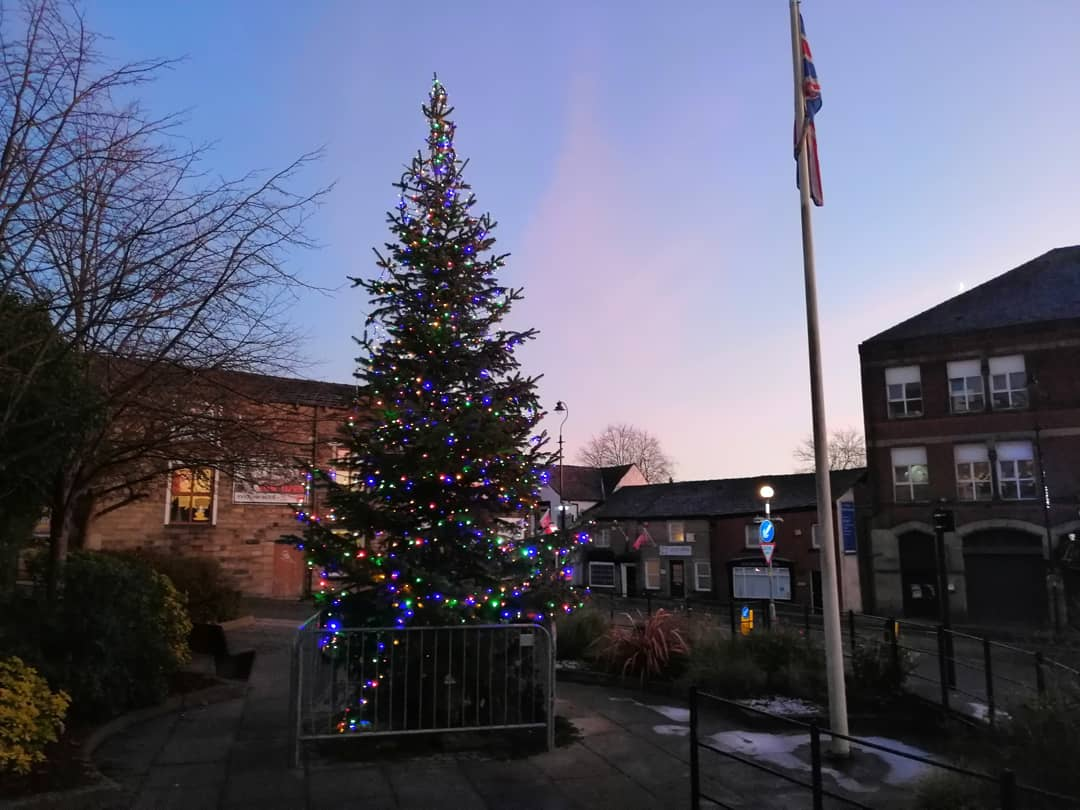
Christmas tree in Lees square

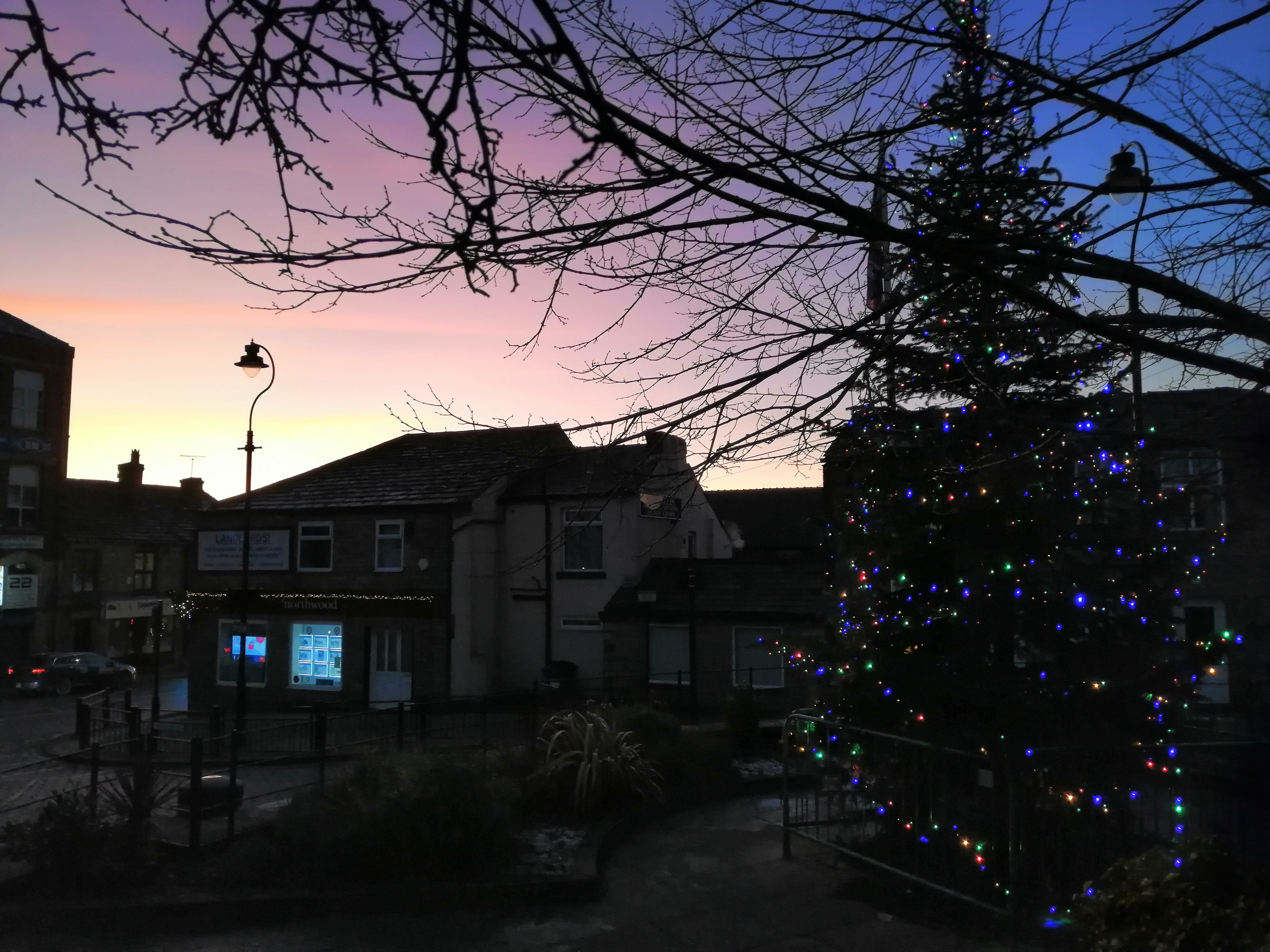
Christmas tree in Lees square

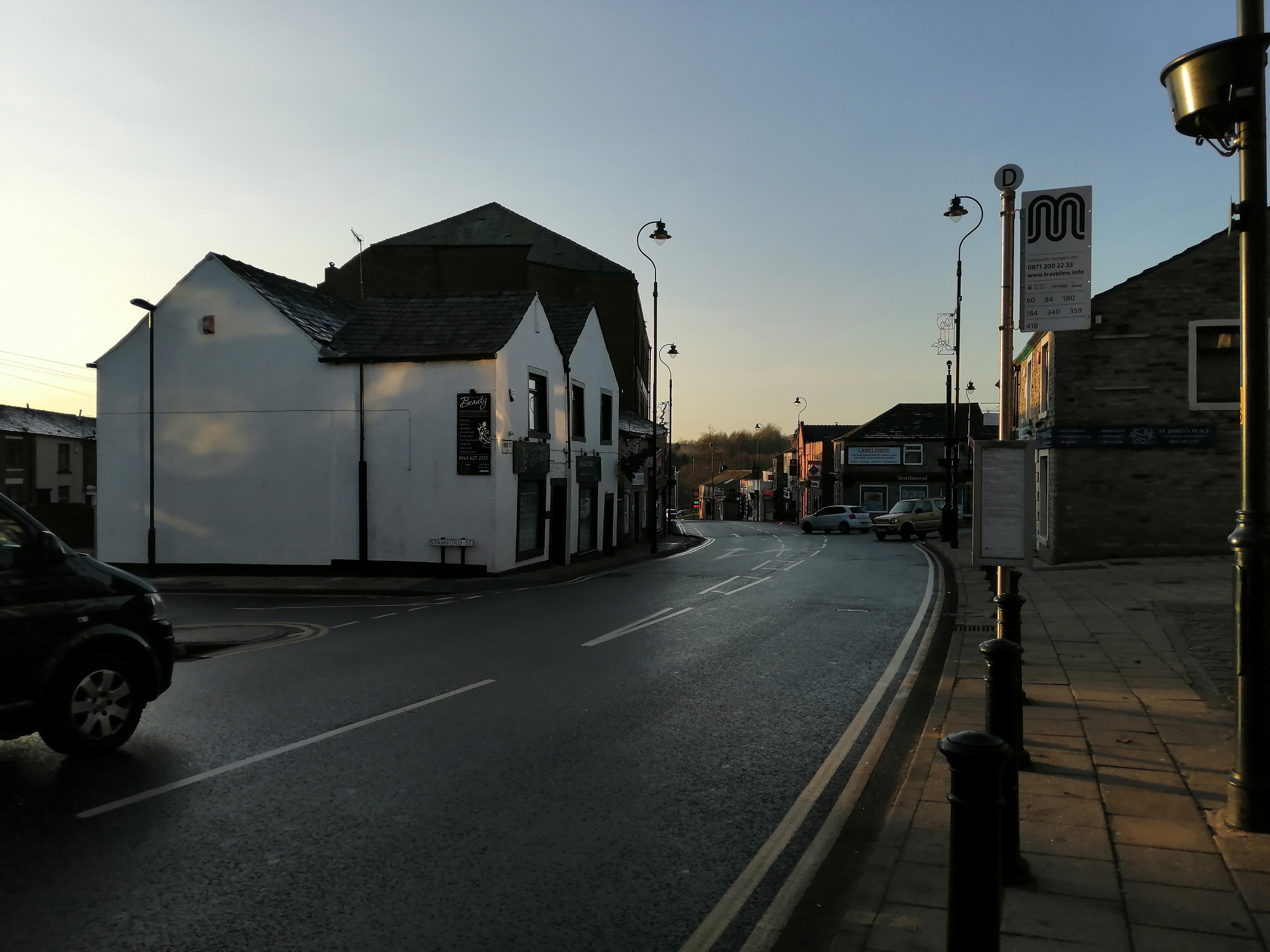
Lees high street facing towards the legends pub

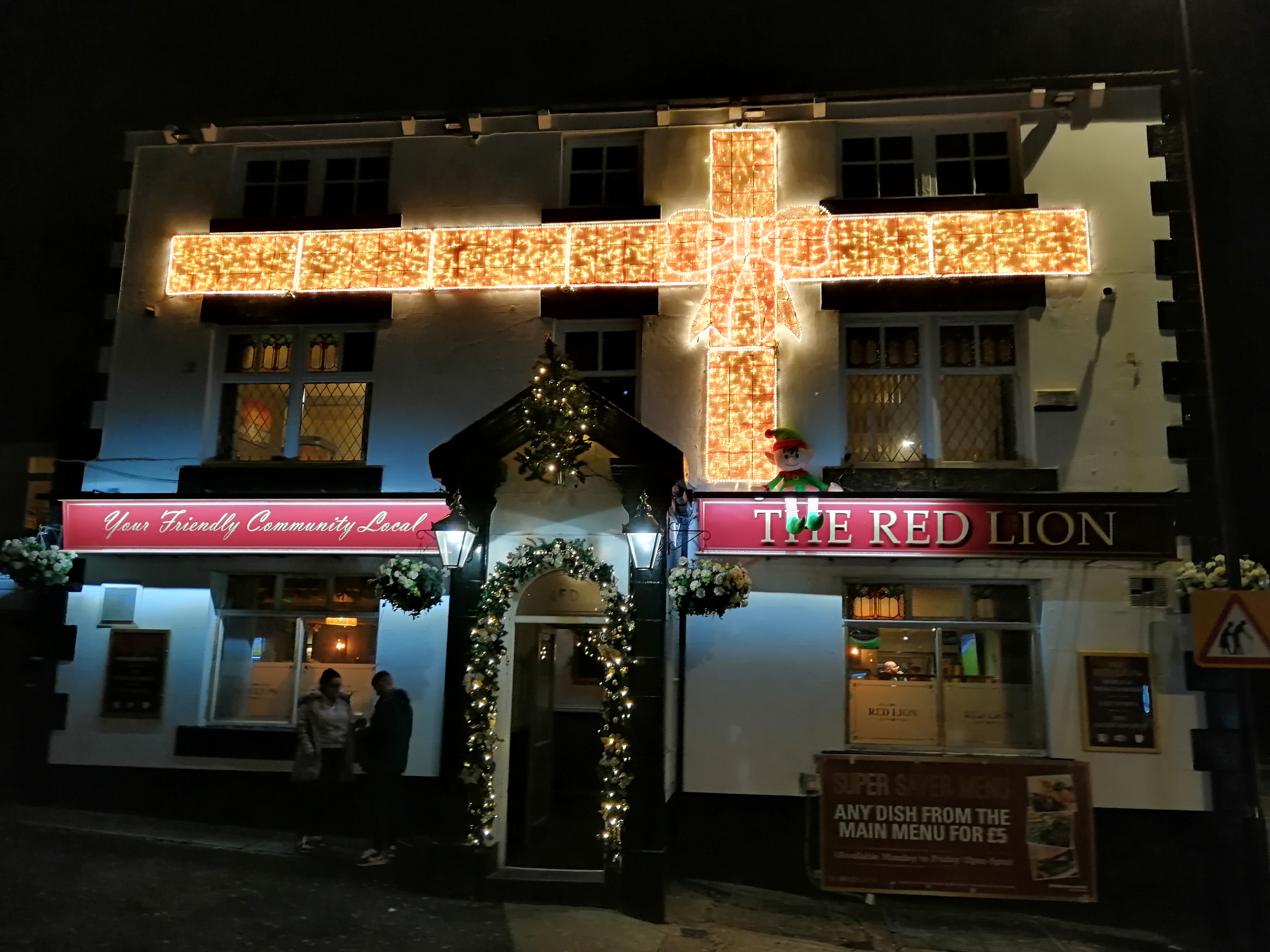
The Red Lion Lees at Christmas
