= Edwin Hugh Shellard =

English architect

Edwin Hugh Shellard (usually known as E. H. Shellard) was an English architect who practised in Manchester, being active between 1844 and 1864. Most of his works are located in Northwest England, in what is now Greater Manchester, Lancashire, Cheshire, and Derbyshire. He was mainly an ecclesiastical architect, and gained contracts to design at least 13 churches for the Church Building Commission, these churches being known as Commissioners' churches. Most of his designs were in Gothic Revival style, usually Early English or Decorated, but he also experimented in the Perpendicular style. He employed the Romanesque Revival style in his additions to St Mary's Church, Preston. The National Heritage List for England shows that at least 23 of his new churches are designated as listed buildings, four of them at Grade II*. The authors of the Buildings of England series consider that his finest work is St John's Minster in Preston, Lancashire.

Shellard died 1 February 1885, aged 69.

== See also ==
- List of works by E. H. Shellard
