= Saint Louis Art Museum =

Art museum in Saint Louis, Missouri

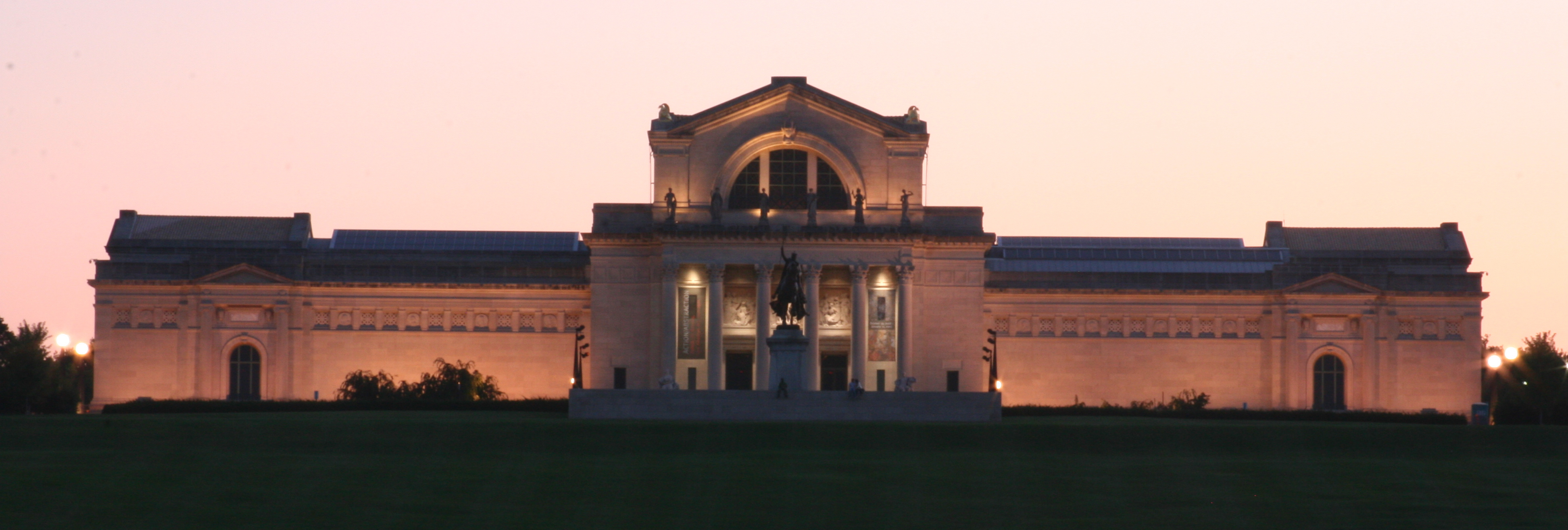

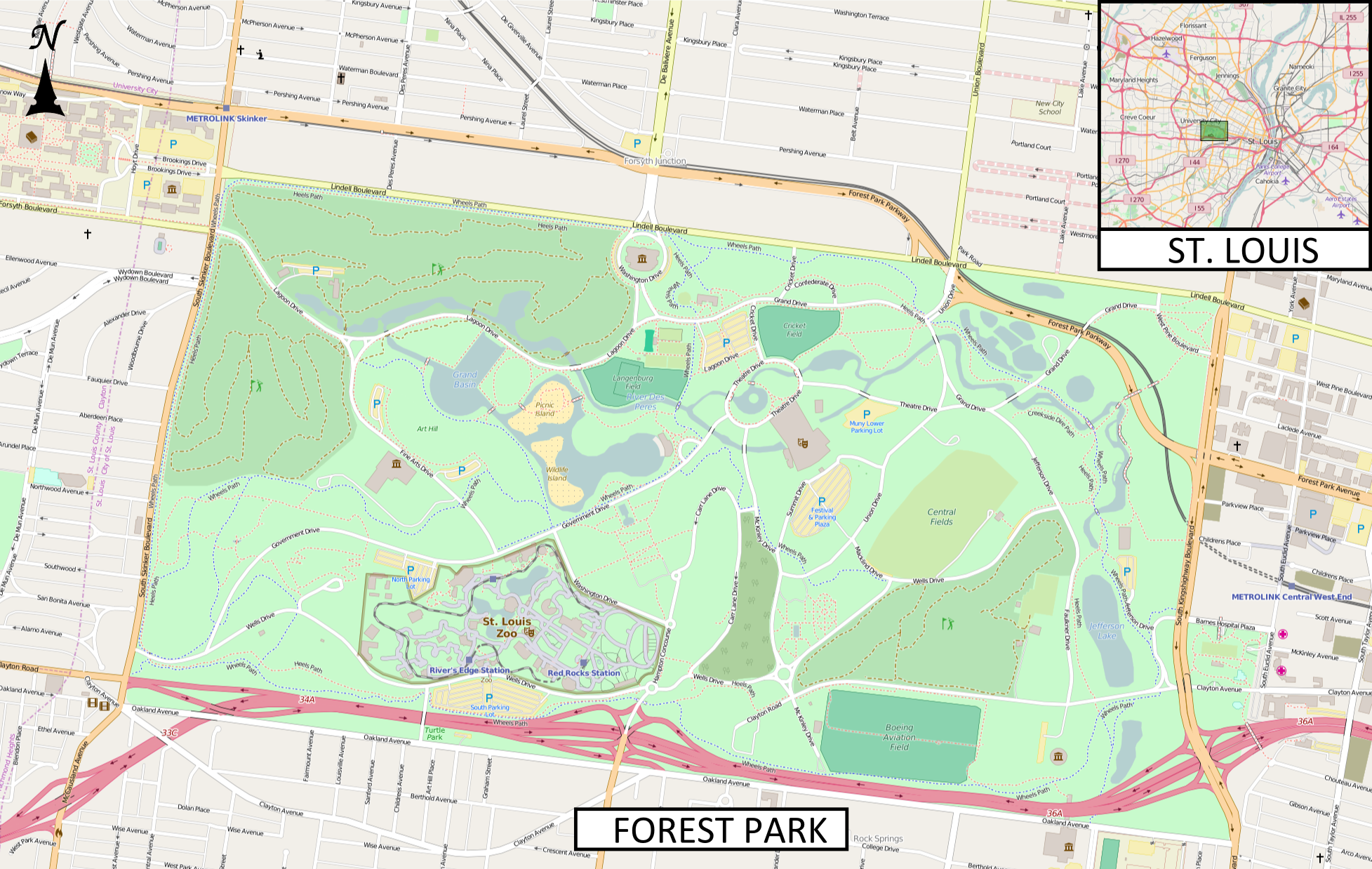
- Location within Forest Park
- Interactive map (click to expand)
- 38°38′22″N 90°17′40″W
- Location: Forest Park, St. Louis, Missouri

History
- Built: 1904
- Built for: 1904 World's Fair

Site notes
- Website: www.slam.org

St. Louis Landmark
- Type: Structure
- Reference no.: 21

The Saint Louis Art Museum (SLAM) is an art museum located in St. Louis, Missouri, United States. With paintings, sculptures, cultural objects, and ancient masterpieces from around the world, its three-story building stands in Forest Park in St. Louis, Missouri, where it is visited by up to a half million people every year. Admission is free through a subsidy from the cultural tax district for St. Louis City and County.

In addition to the featured exhibitions, the museum offers rotating exhibitions and installations. These include the Currents series, which features contemporary artists, as well as regular exhibitions of new media art and works on paper.

== History ==
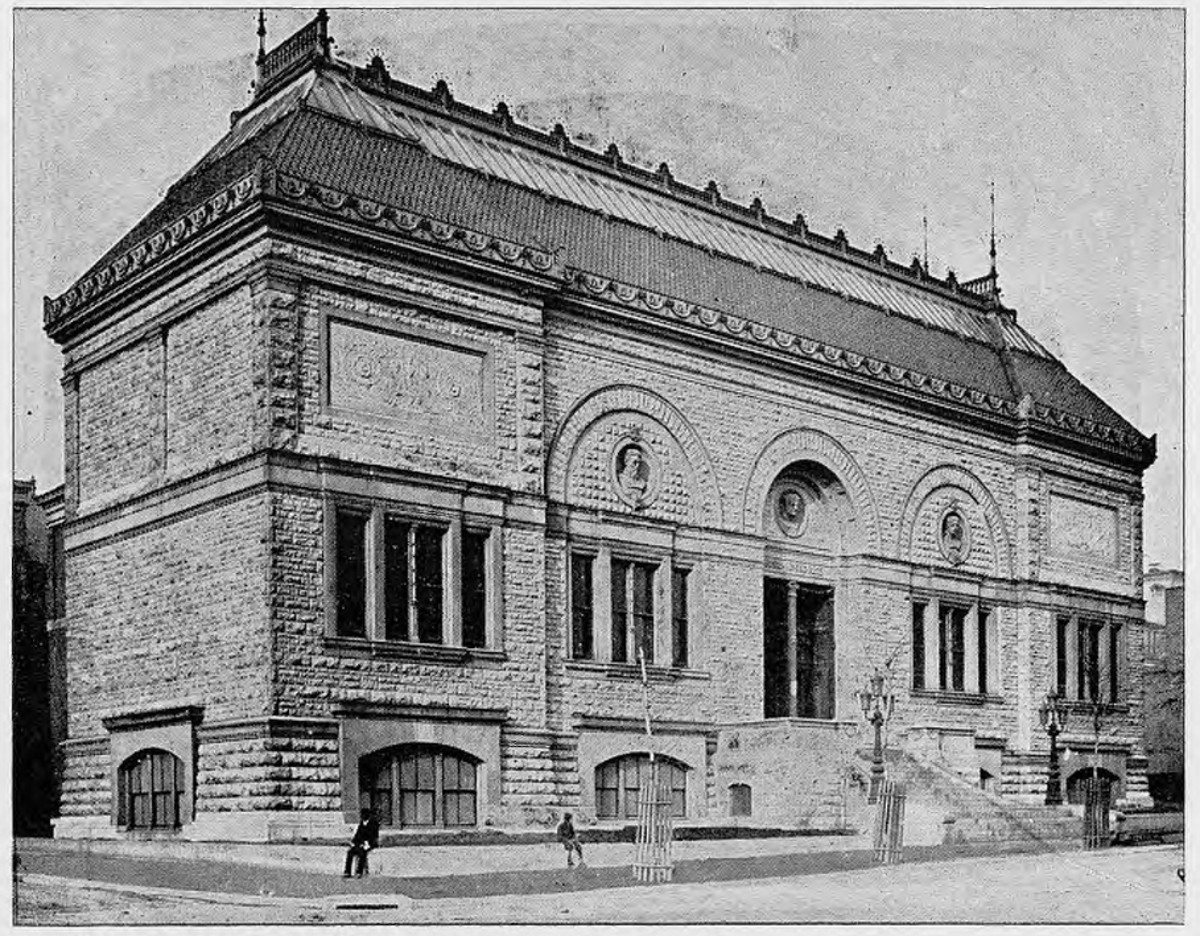
1879 Peabody and Stearns building (razed 1919)

The museum's origins date to 1879, when the Saint Louis School and Museum of Fine Arts was founded as part of Washington University. The nascent museum was housed in a building commissioned of Boston architects Peabody and Stearns by businessman and politician Wayman Crow, as a memorial to his son, Wayman Crow Jr. The structure was located at 19th and Lucas Place (now Locust Street). The school, led by director Halsey Ives, offered studio and art history instruction supported by a museum collection.

When the 1904 Louisiana Purchase Exposition closed, the museum and school moved from the Peabody-Stearns structure to Cass Gilbert's Palace of Fine Arts building. After the museum’s move, the Peabody-Stearns building rapidly fell into disrepair and was eventually demolished in 1919.

After the relocation, Director Ives introduced a bill into the General Assembly for an art tax to support museum maintenance. The citizens of Saint Louis approved the bill by a nearly 4-to-1 margin; however, the city's controller refused to distribute the tax as the museum was not recognized as a municipal entity and thus had no right to tax money. The Supreme Court of Missouri upheld this decision in 1908. This caused the formal separation of the museum from the university in 1909, a split which was the beginning of three civic institutions:

- a newly created, public City Art Museum, to remain in the Palace of Fine Arts, the organization which evolved into the Saint Louis Art Museum; an organizing board was assigned to take control in 1912.
- the Mildred Lane Kemper Art Museum affiliated with the private Washington University, whose collection was lent to the City Art Museum for several years, and now part of the Sam Fox School of Design & Visual Arts
- the St. Louis School of Fine Arts, also part of Washington University. In 1905 Ives had been immediately succeeded as director by Edmund H. Wuerpel; as of September 1909 Wuerpel advertised classes at Skinker and Lindell. Wuerpel remained director until his retirement in 1939. The school is now also part of the Sam Fox School of Design & Visual Arts.

During the 1950s, the museum expanded to include an auditorium for films, concerts, and lectures. Director Charles Guggenheim's An American Museum (1959) debuted in the new auditorium space as a 50th anniversary event.

In 1971, efforts to secure the museum's financial future led voters in St. Louis City and County to approve the creation of the Metropolitan Zoological Park and Museum District (ZMD). This expanded the tax base for the 1908 tax to include St. Louis County. In 1972, the museum was again renamed, to the Saint Louis Art Museum.

Today, the museum is supported financially by the tax, donations from individuals and public associations, sales in the Museum Shop, and foundation support.

=== Expansion ===
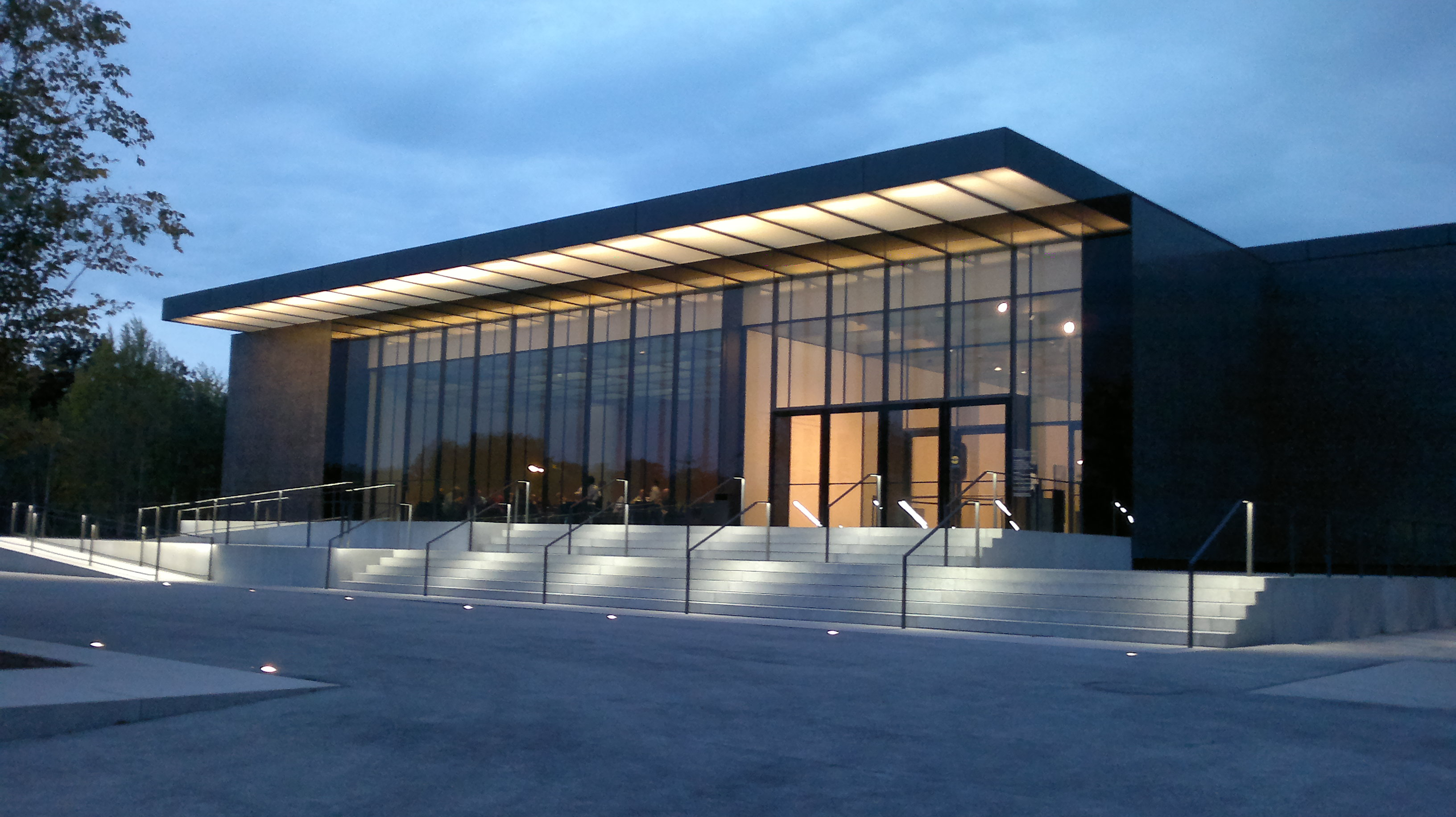
East Building, the new wing designed by British architect Sir David Chipperfield

Plans to expand the museum, which existed in the 1995 Forest Park Master Plan and the museum's 2000 Strategic Plan, began in earnest in 2005, when the museum board selected the British architect Sir David Chipperfield to design the expansion; Michel Desvigne was selected as landscape architect. The St. Louis-based firm, Hellmuth, Obata, and Kassabaum (HOK) was the architect of record to work with the construction team.

On November 5, 2007, museum officials released the design plans to the public and hosted public conversations about those plans. A model of the new building was displayed in the museum's Sculpture Hall throughout the construction project. In 2008, citing the declining state of the economy, the museum announced that it would delay the start of the expansion, whose cost was then estimated at $125 million.

Construction began in 2009; the museum remained open. The expansion added more than 224,000 square feet (20,800 m^{2}) of gallery space, including an underground garage, within the lease lines of the property. Funding for the project was raised via private gifts to the capital campaign from individuals, foundations and corporations, and from proceeds from the sale of tax-exempt bonds. The fundraising campaigned covered the $130-million cost of construction and a $31.2 million increase to the museum's endowment to support incremental costs of operating the larger facility. The expanded facility opened in the summer of 2013.

== Collection ==
The collection of the Saint Louis Art Museum contains more than 34,000 objects dating from antiquity to the present. The collection is divided into nine areas:

1. American
2. Ancient and Egyptian
3. Africa, Oceania, Americas
4. Asian
5. Decorative Arts and Design
6. European to 1800
7. Islamic
8. Modern and Contemporary
9. Prints, Drawings, and Photographs

The modern art collection includes works by the European masters Matisse, Gauguin, Monet, Picasso, Corrado Giaquinto, Giambattista Pittoni and Van Gogh. The museum's particularly strong collection of 20th-century German paintings includes the world's largest Max Beckmann collection, which includes Christ and the Woman Taken in Adultery. In recent years, the museum has been actively acquiring post-war German art to complement its Beckmanns, such as works by Joseph Beuys, Gerhard Richter, Martin Kippenberger, Sigmar Polke, and Anselm Kiefer. The collection also includes Chuck Close's Keith (1970).

The collections of Oceanic and Mesoamerican works, as well as handwoven Turkish rugs, are among the finest in the world. The museum holds the Egyptian mummy Amen-Nestawy-Nakht, and two mummies on loan from Washington University, Padi-menekh and Henut-wedjebu. Its collection of American artists includes the largest U.S.-museum collection of paintings by George Caleb Bingham.

The collection contains at least six pieces that Nazis confiscated from their own museums as degenerate. These include Max Beckmann's "Christ and the Woman Taken in Adultery" which came to the museum through a New York art dealer, Curt Valentin, who specialized in Nazi confiscations, and Matisse's "Bathers with a Turtle" which Joseph Pulitzer purchased at the Galerie Fischer auction held in the Grand Hôtel National, Lucerne, Switzerland, June 30, 1939.

In the context of the museum's 2013 expansion, British artist Andy Goldsworthy created Stone Sea, a site-specific work for a narrow space between the old and new buildings. Twenty-five tightly packed, ten-foot-high arches made of native limestone rise in a sunken courtyard. The artist was inspired by the fact that the sedimentary rock was formed when the region was a shallow sea in Prehistoric times.

In 2021, the museum received a promised gift of 22 paintings and sculptures from the collection of the American curator and philanthropist Emily Rauh Pulitzer, the widow of the media heir Joseph Pulitzer Jr. The donation includes works by 17 European and American artists, including Pablo Picasso, Georges Braque, Constantin Brâncuși, Joan Miró, Philip Guston, Ellsworth Kelly and others.

== Selected Paintings ==
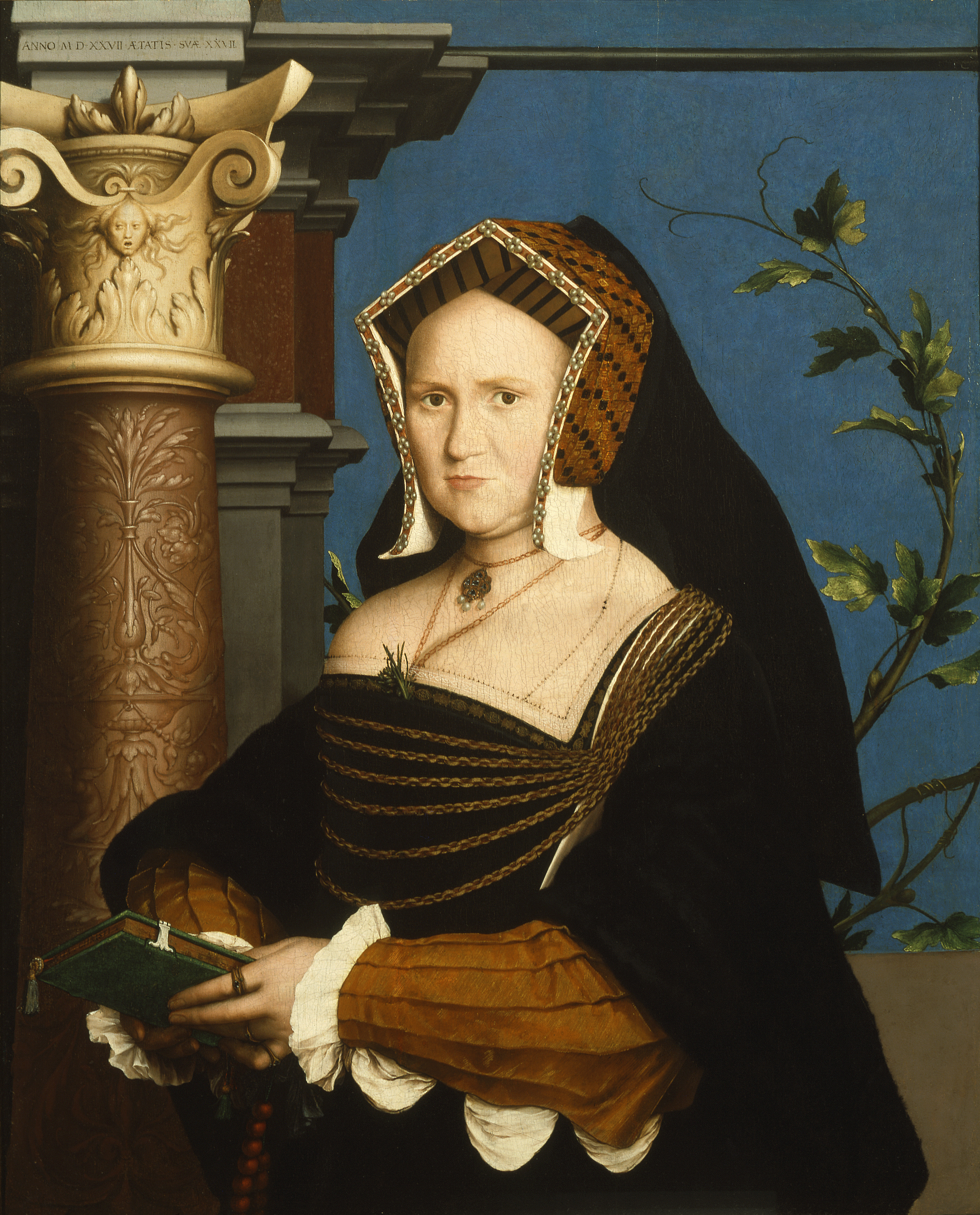
Hans Holbein the Younger, Mary, Lady Guildford, 1527

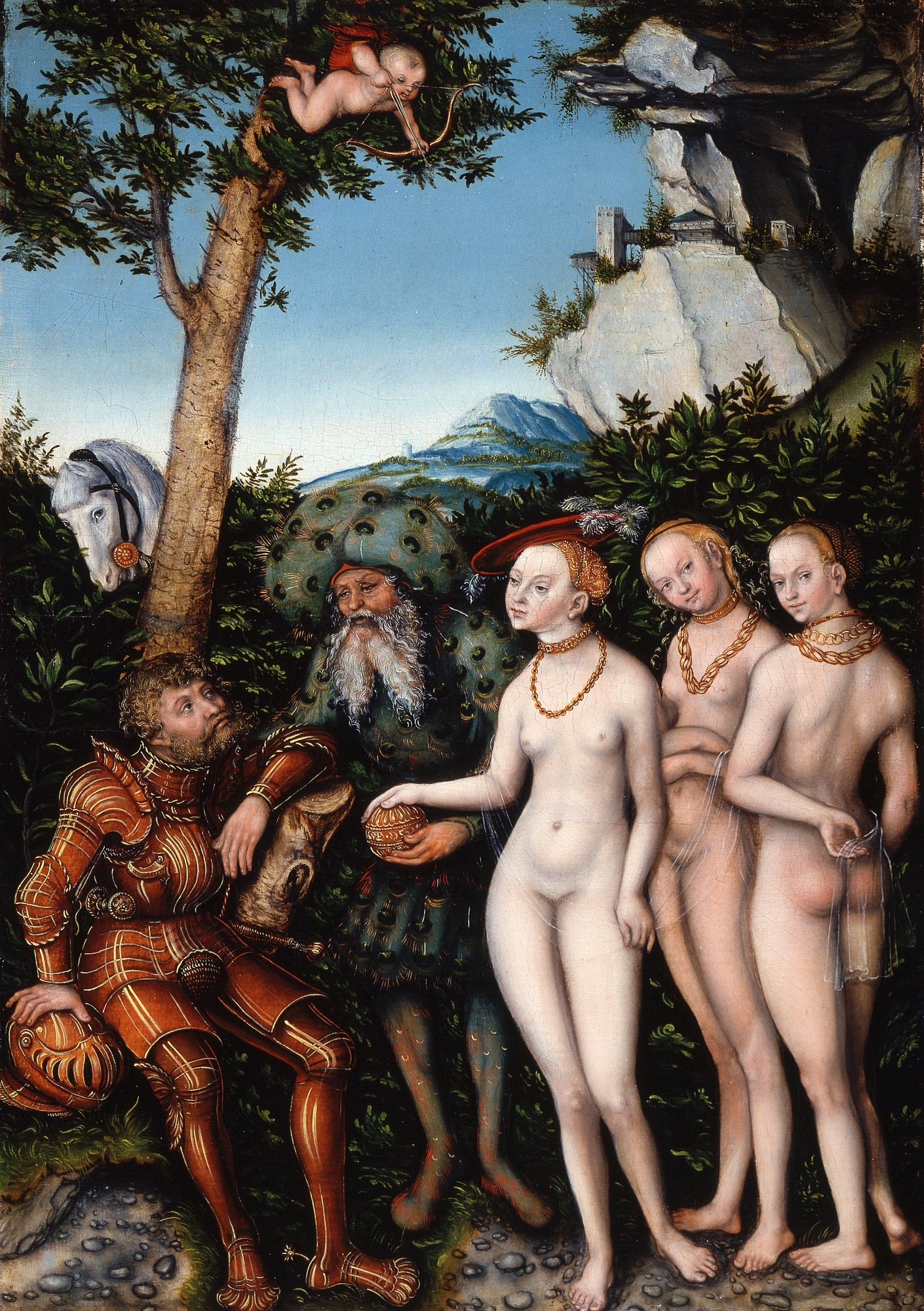
Lucas Cranach the Elder, Judgment of Paris, 1530

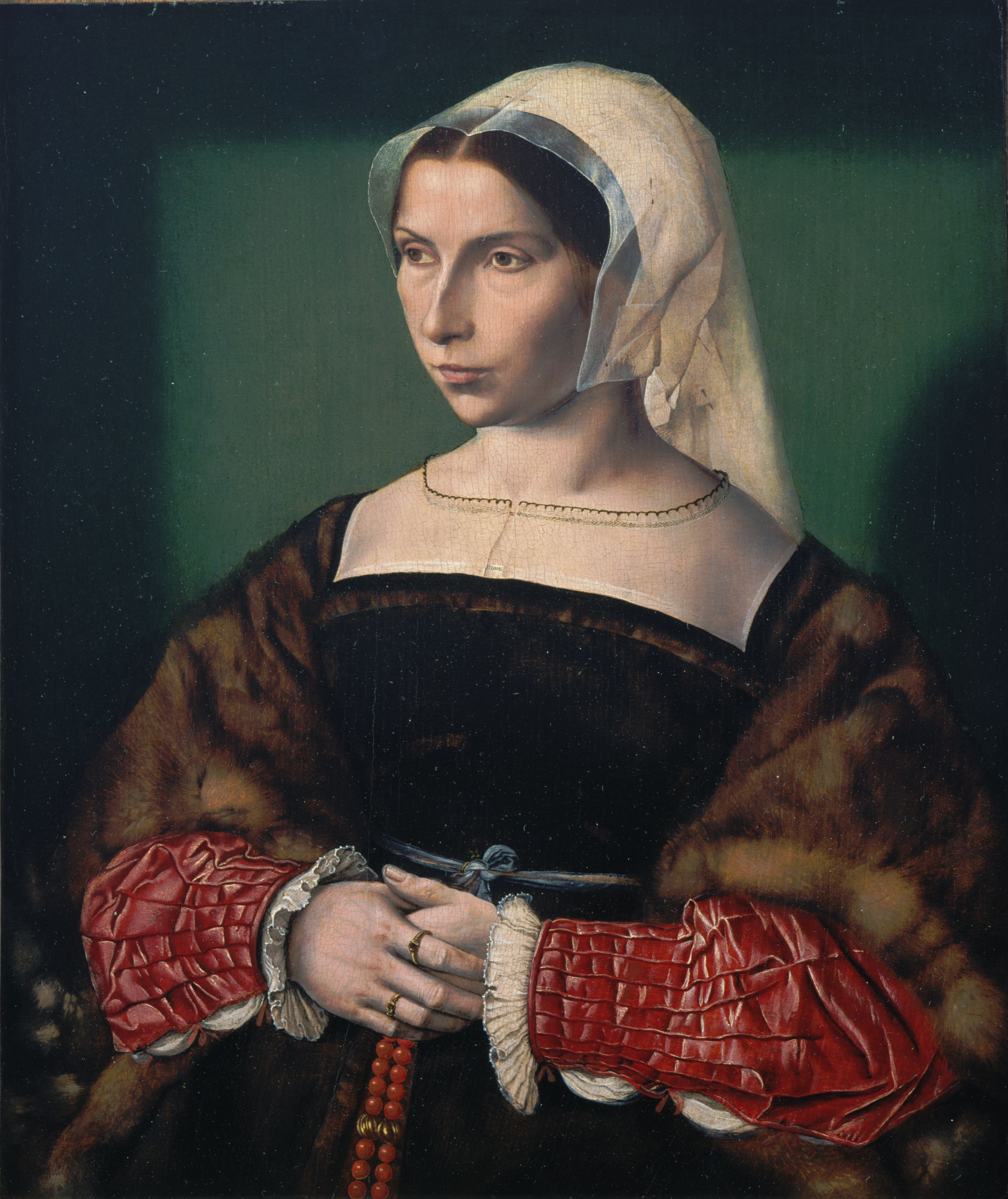
Ambrosius Benson, Portrait of Anne Stafford, 1535

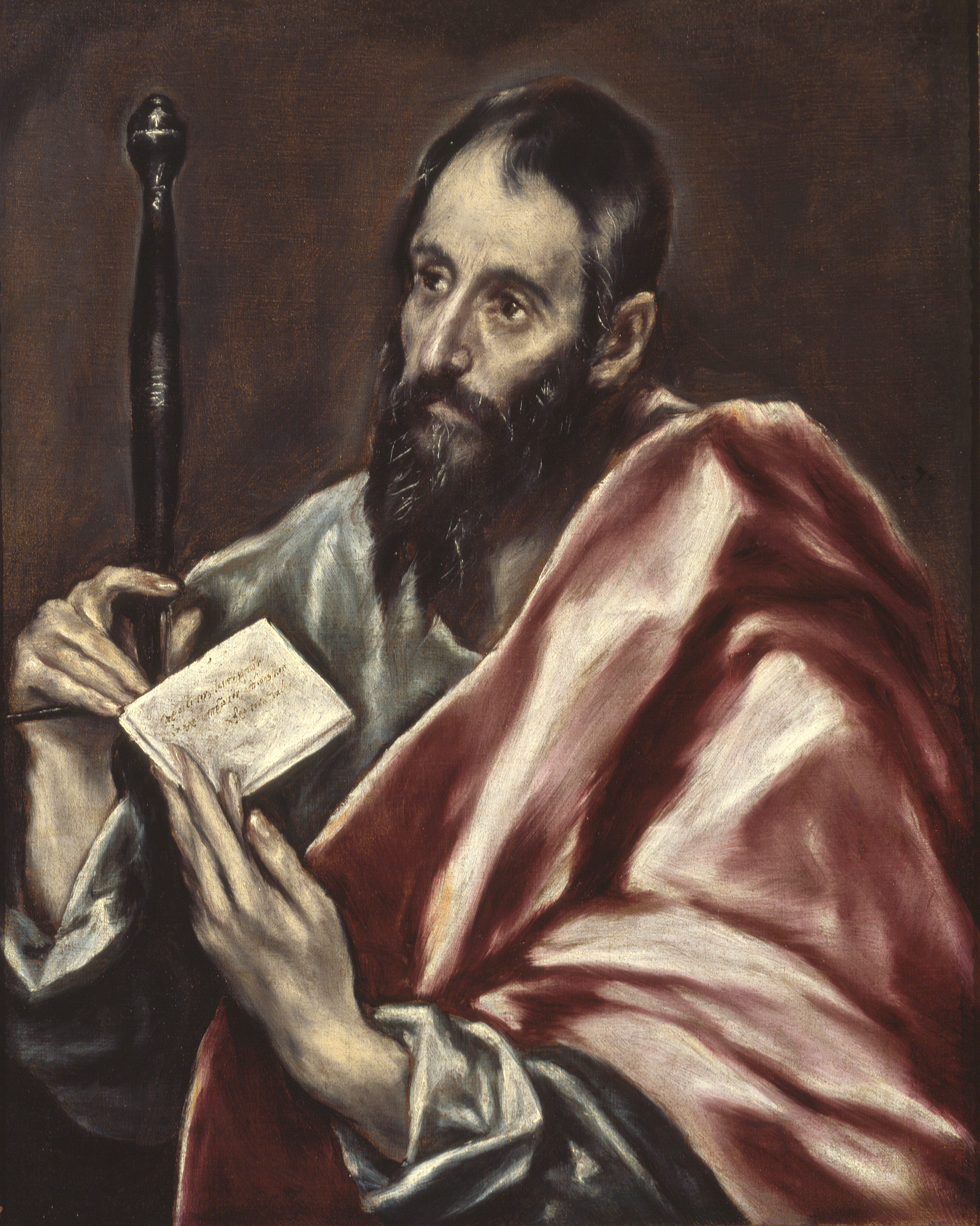
El Greco (Domenikos Theotokopoulos), St. Paul, 1598–1600

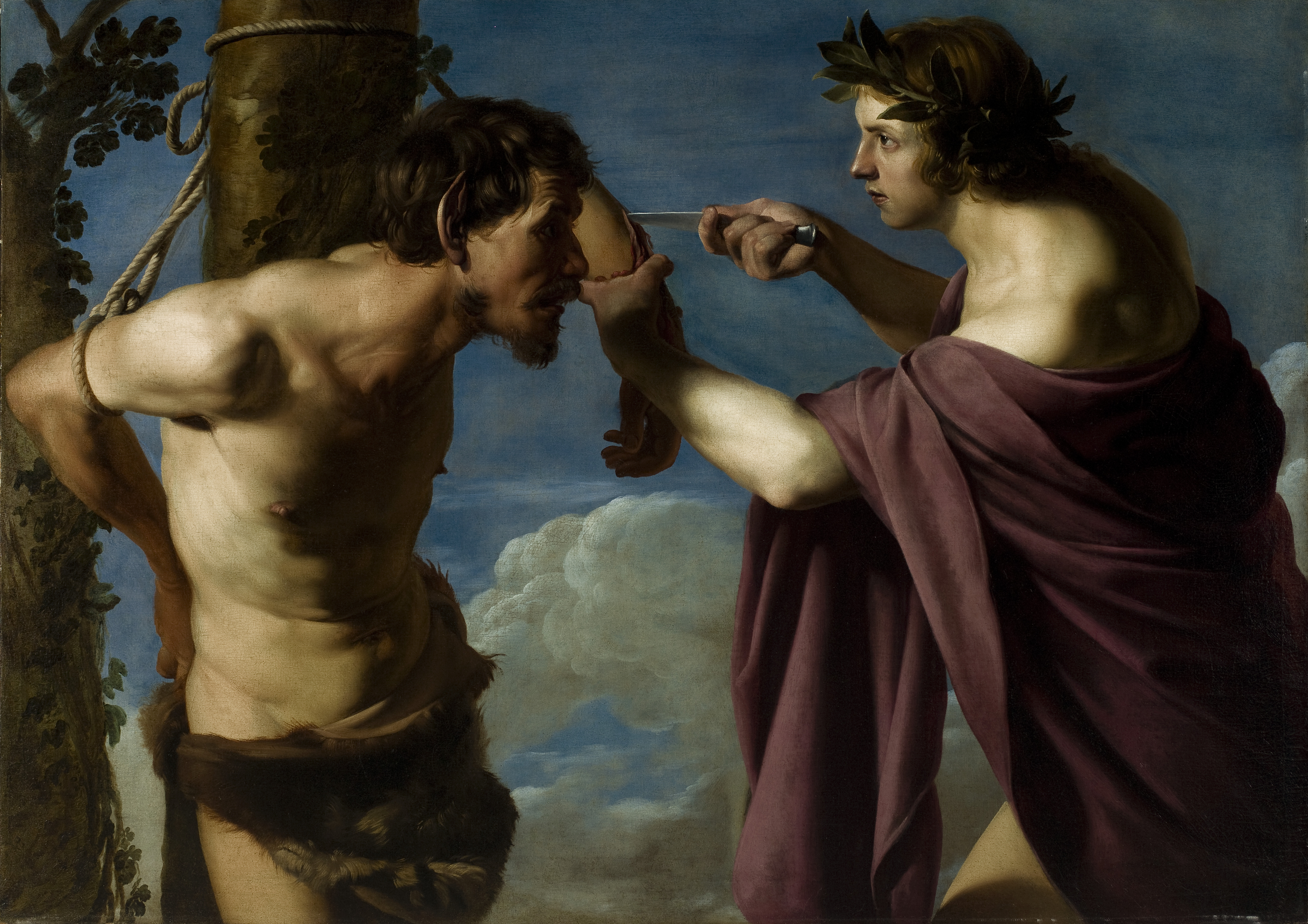
Bartolomeo Manfredi, Apollo and Marsyas, 1616–20

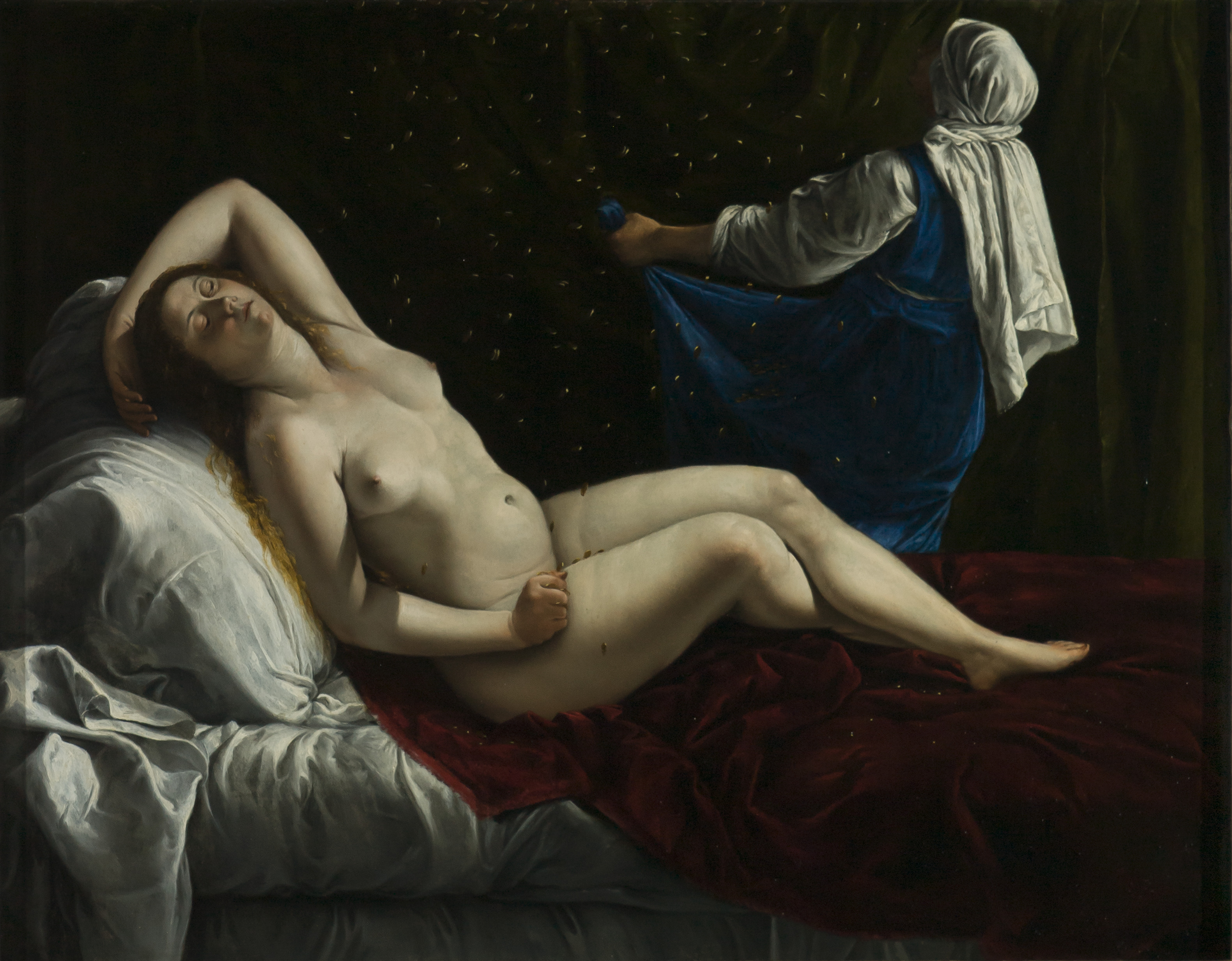
Artemisia Gentileschi, Danaë, 1620

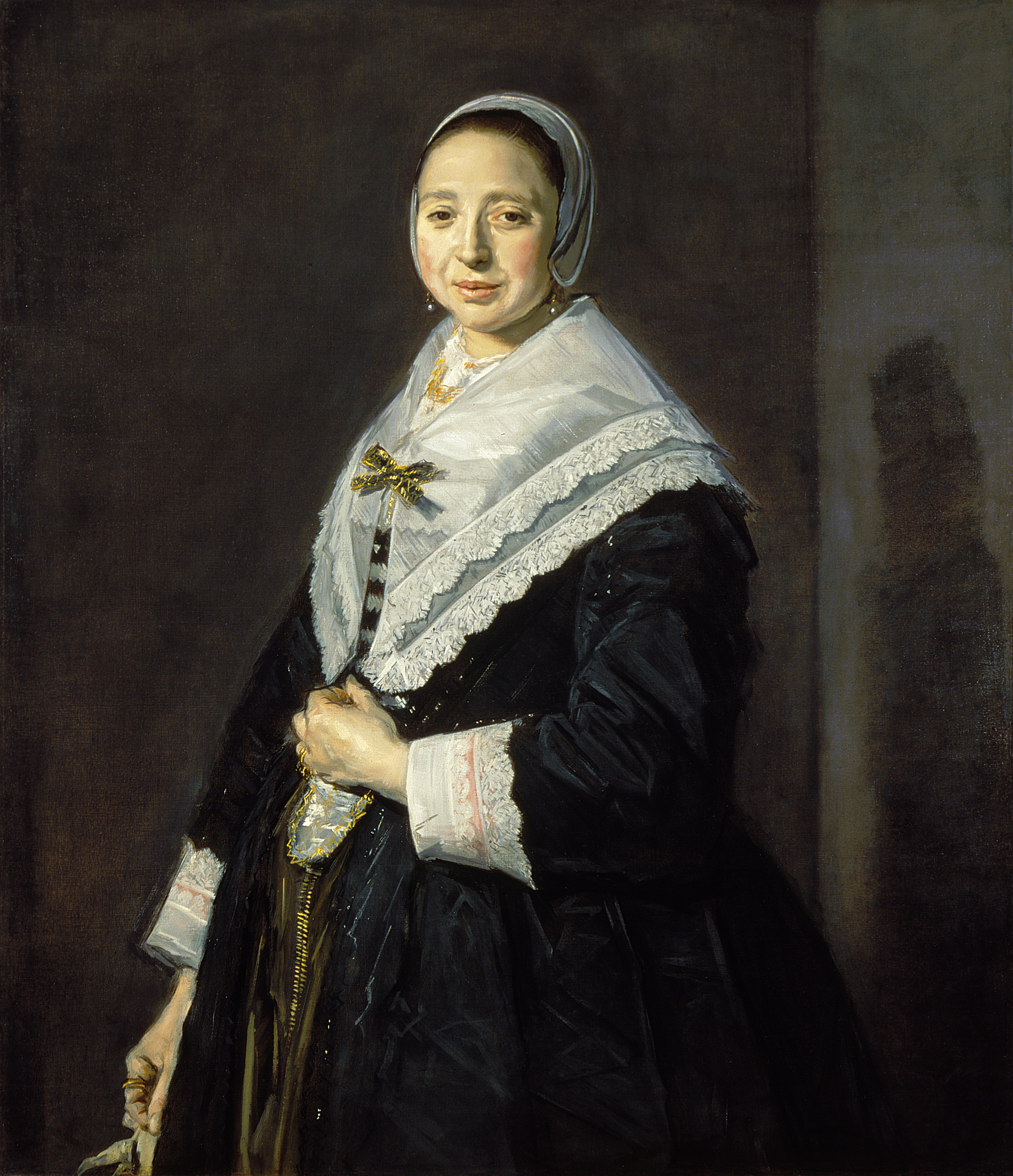
Frans Hals, Portrait of a Woman, 1650–52

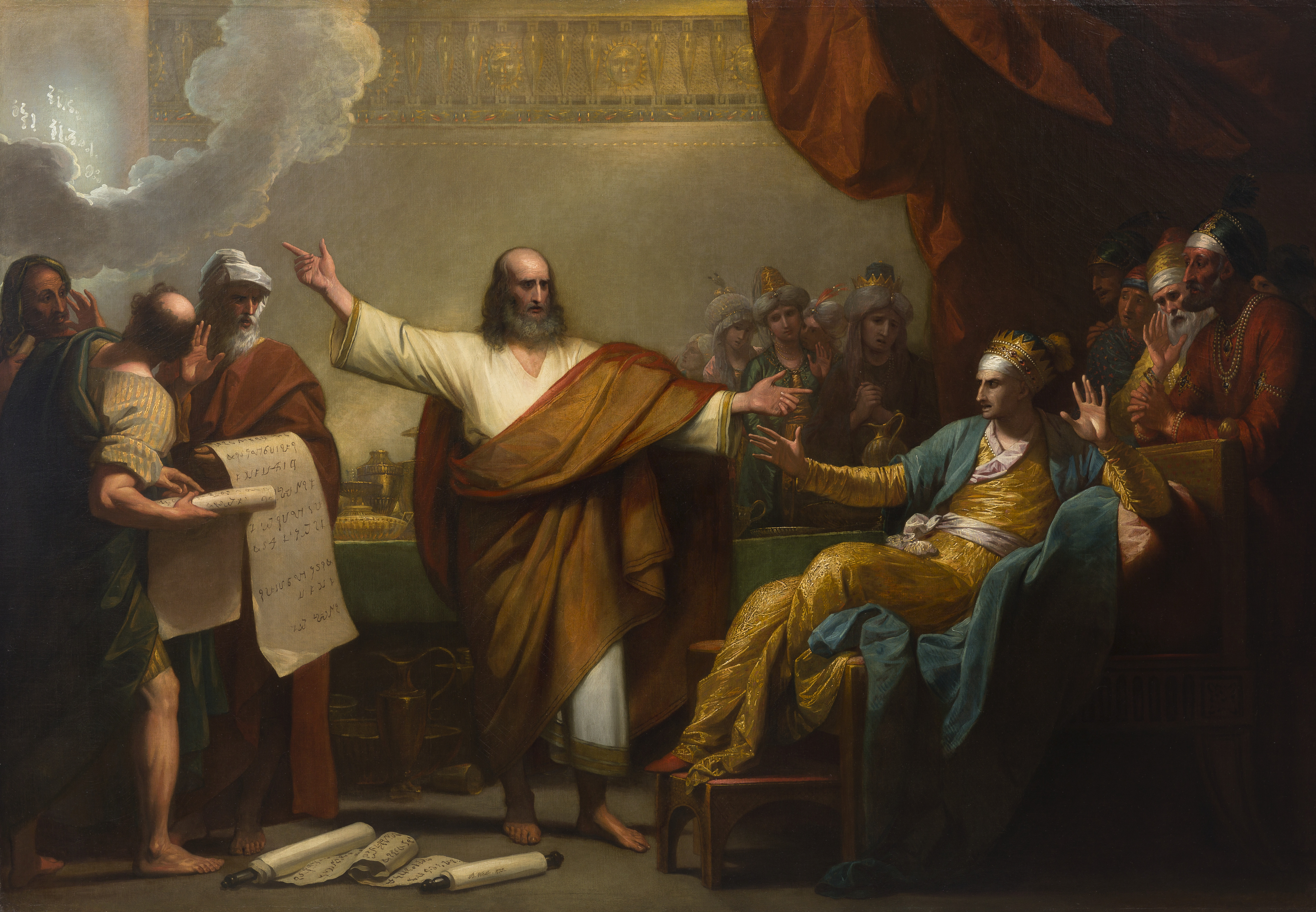
Benjamin West, Daniel Interpreting to Belshazzar the Writing on the Wall, 1775

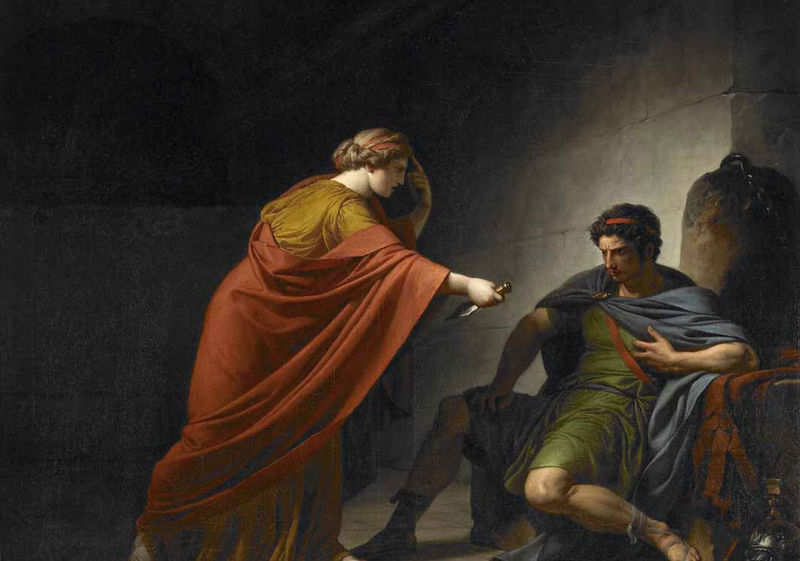
François-André Vincent, Arria and Paetus, 1784

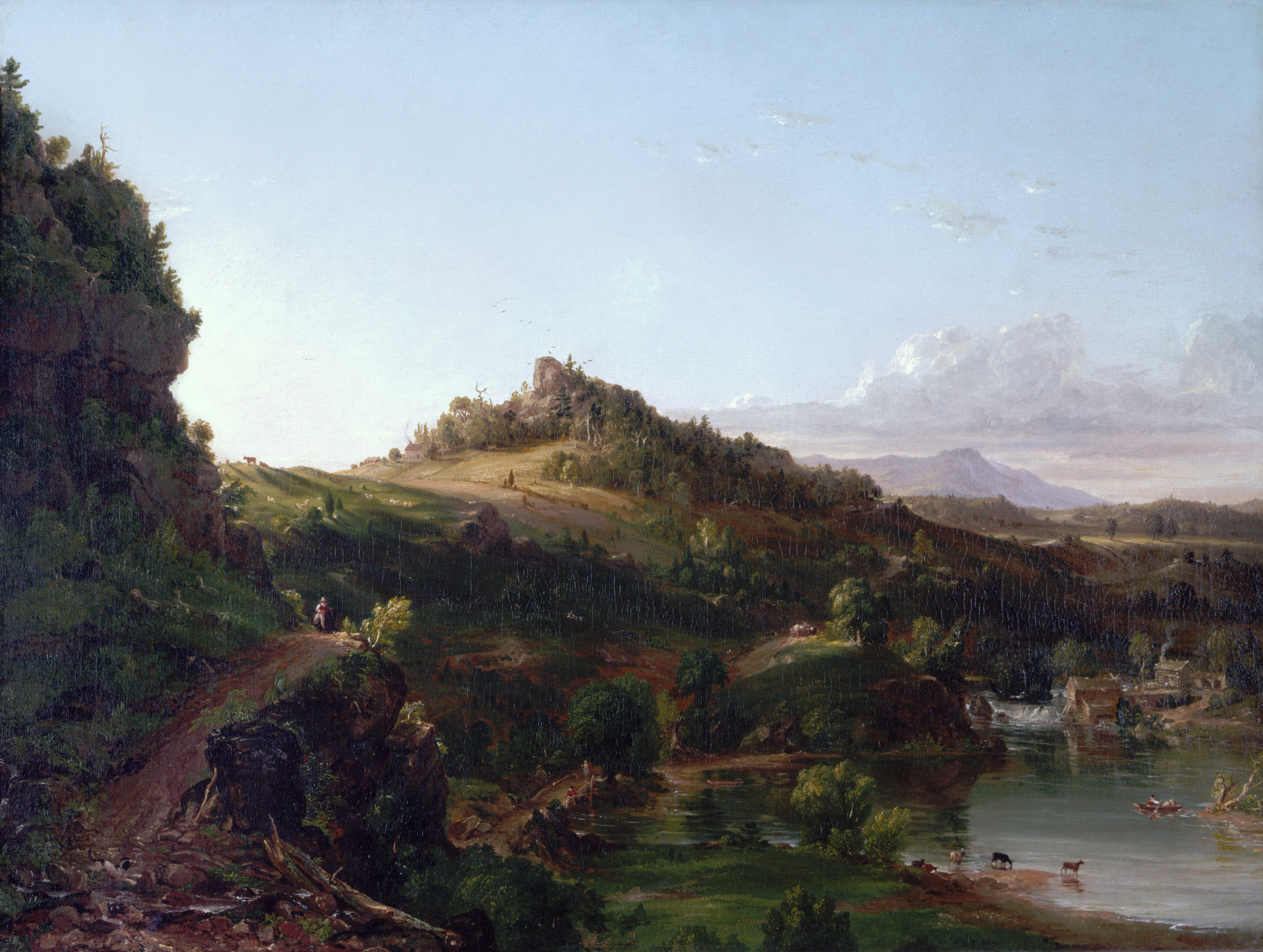
Thomas Cole, Catskill Scenery, 1833

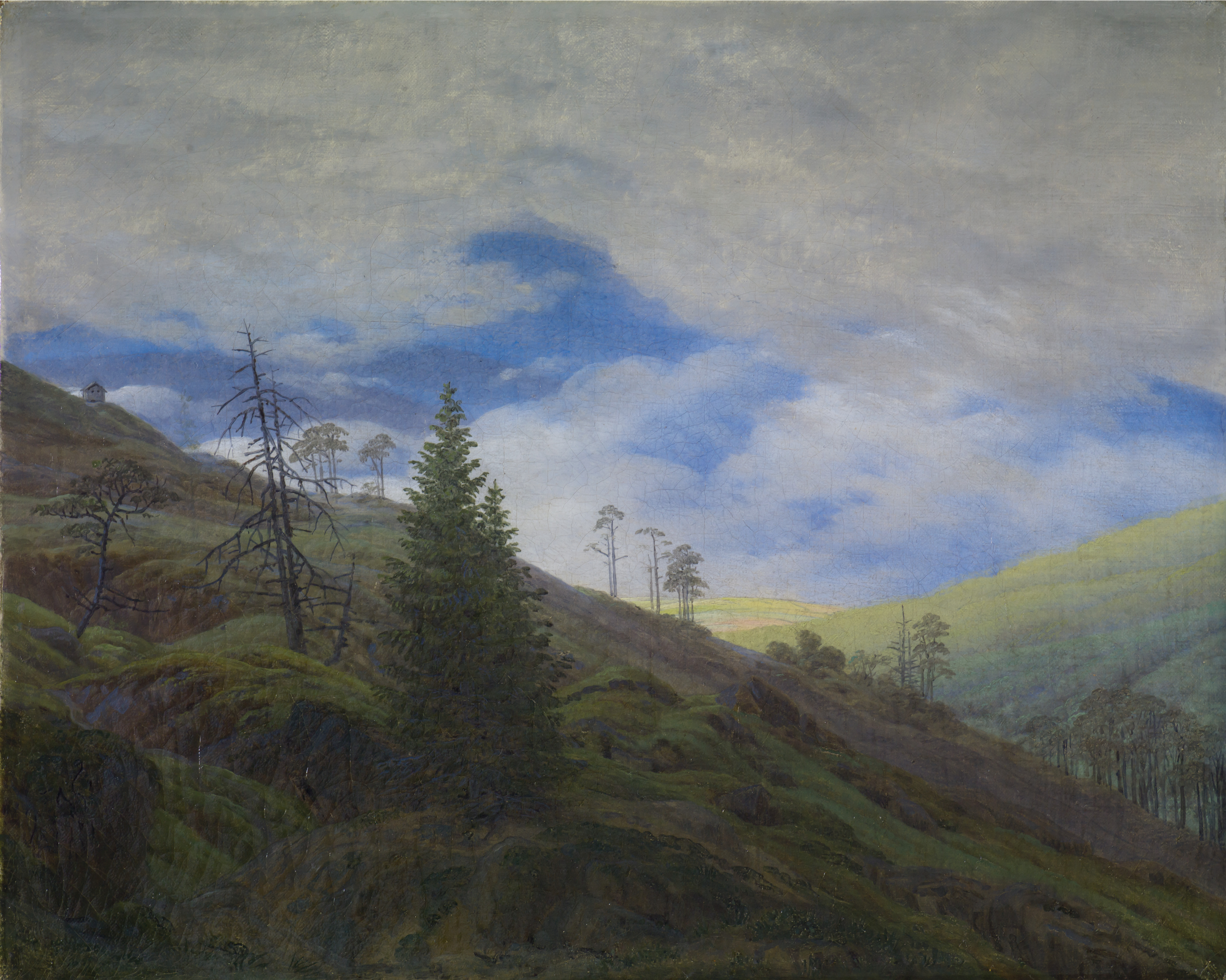
Caspar David Friedrich, Sunburst in the Riesengebirge, 1835

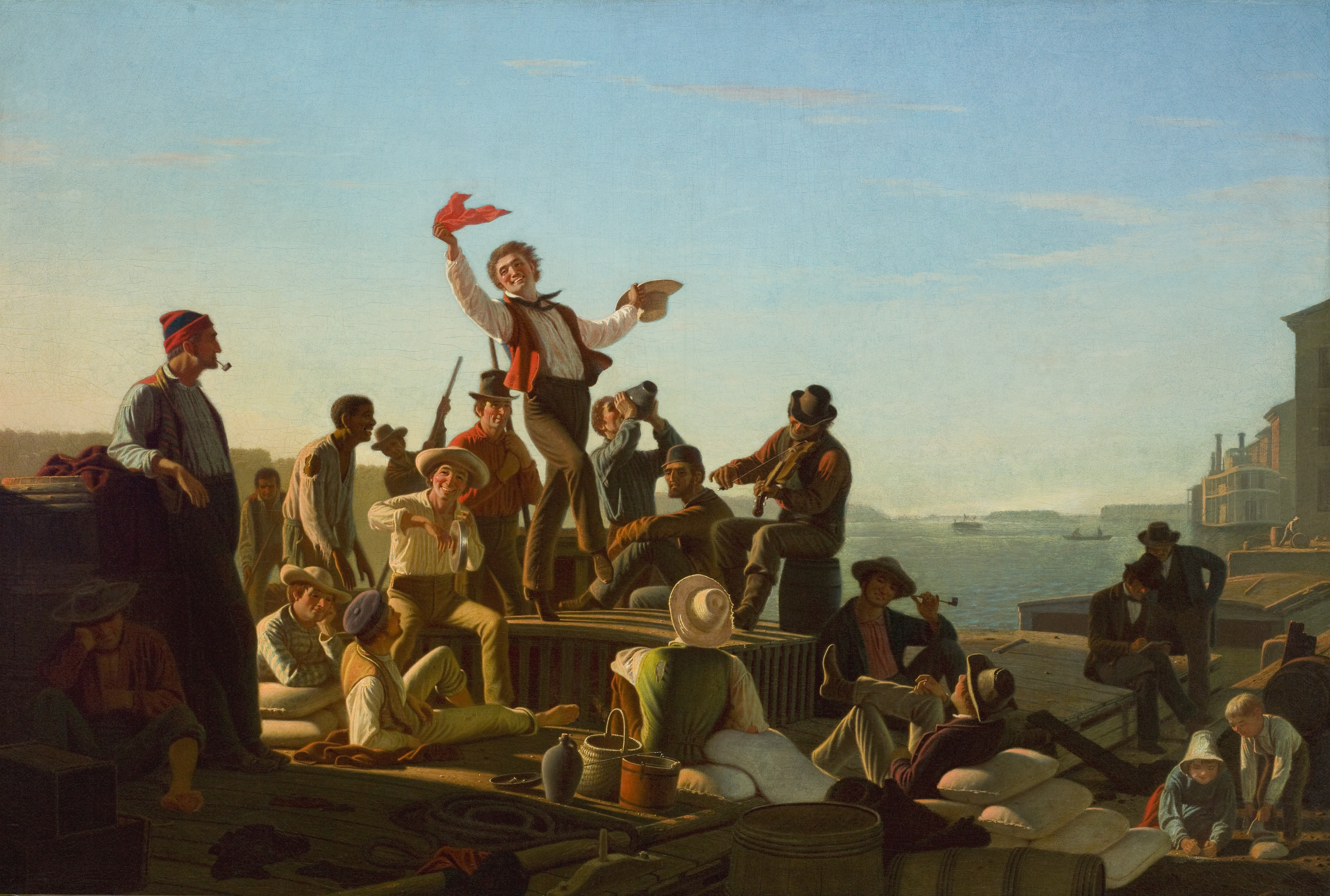
George Caleb Bingham, Jolly Flatboatmen in Port, 1857

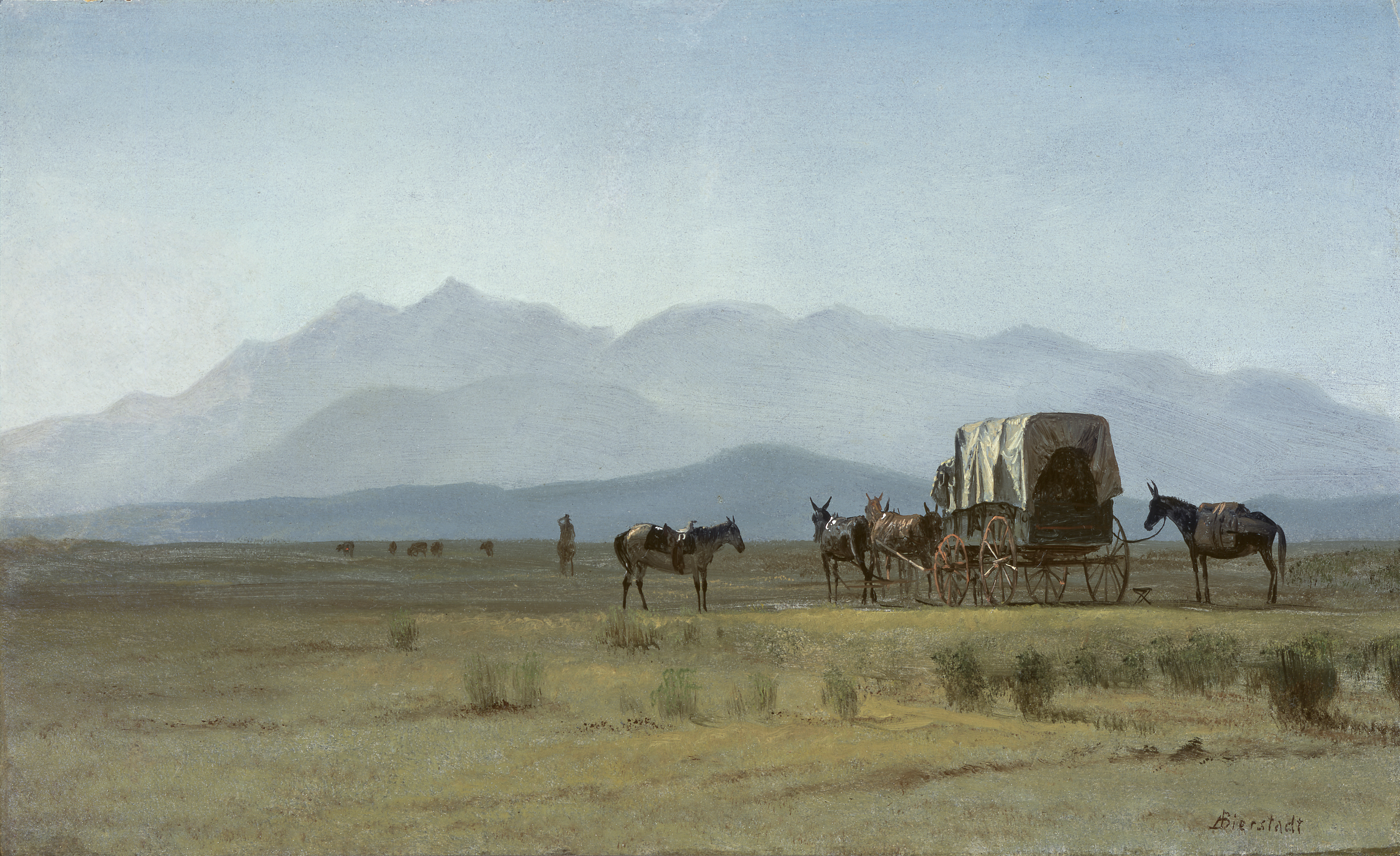
Albert Bierstadt, Surveyor's Wagon in the Rockies, 1859

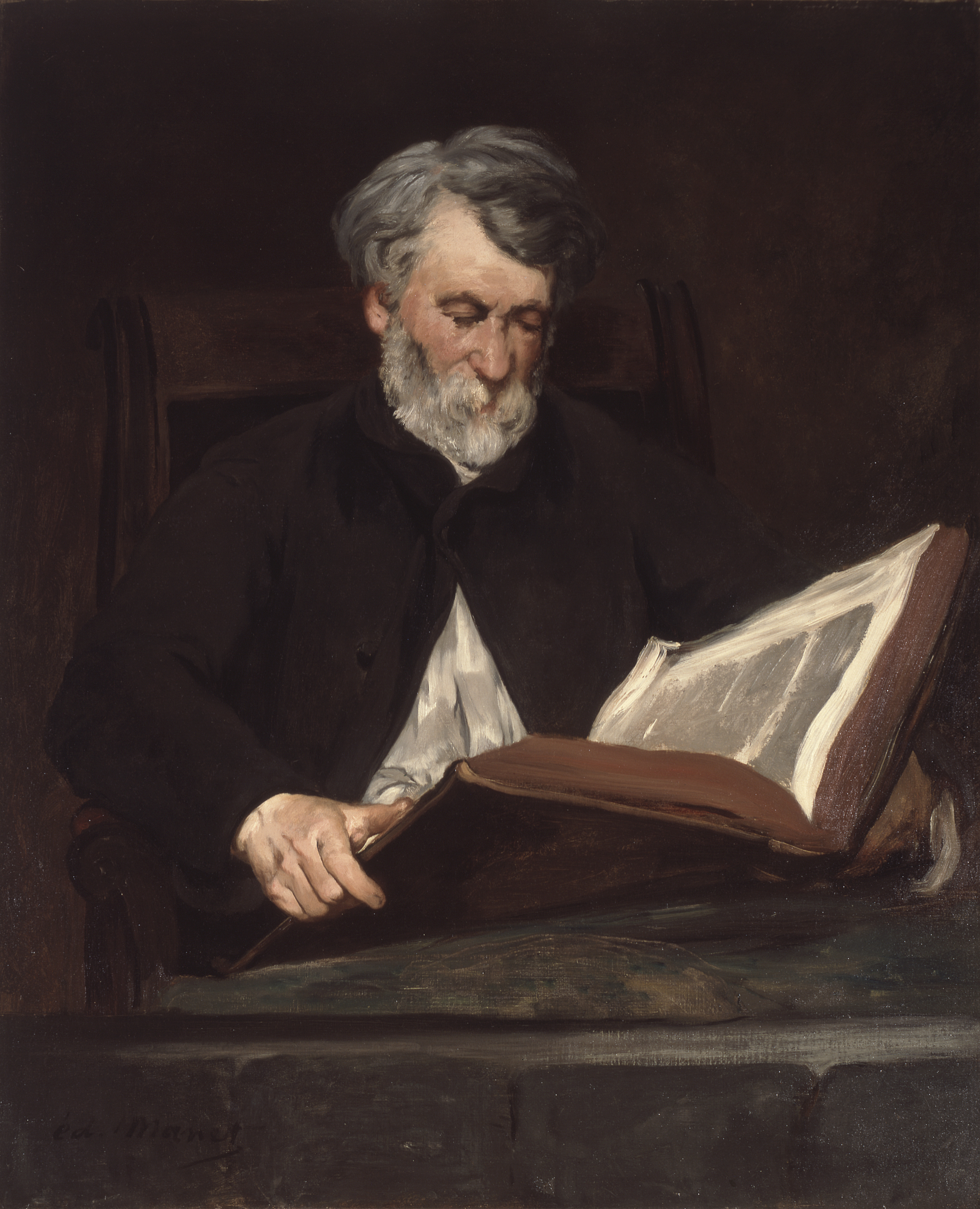
Édouard Manet, The Reader, 1861

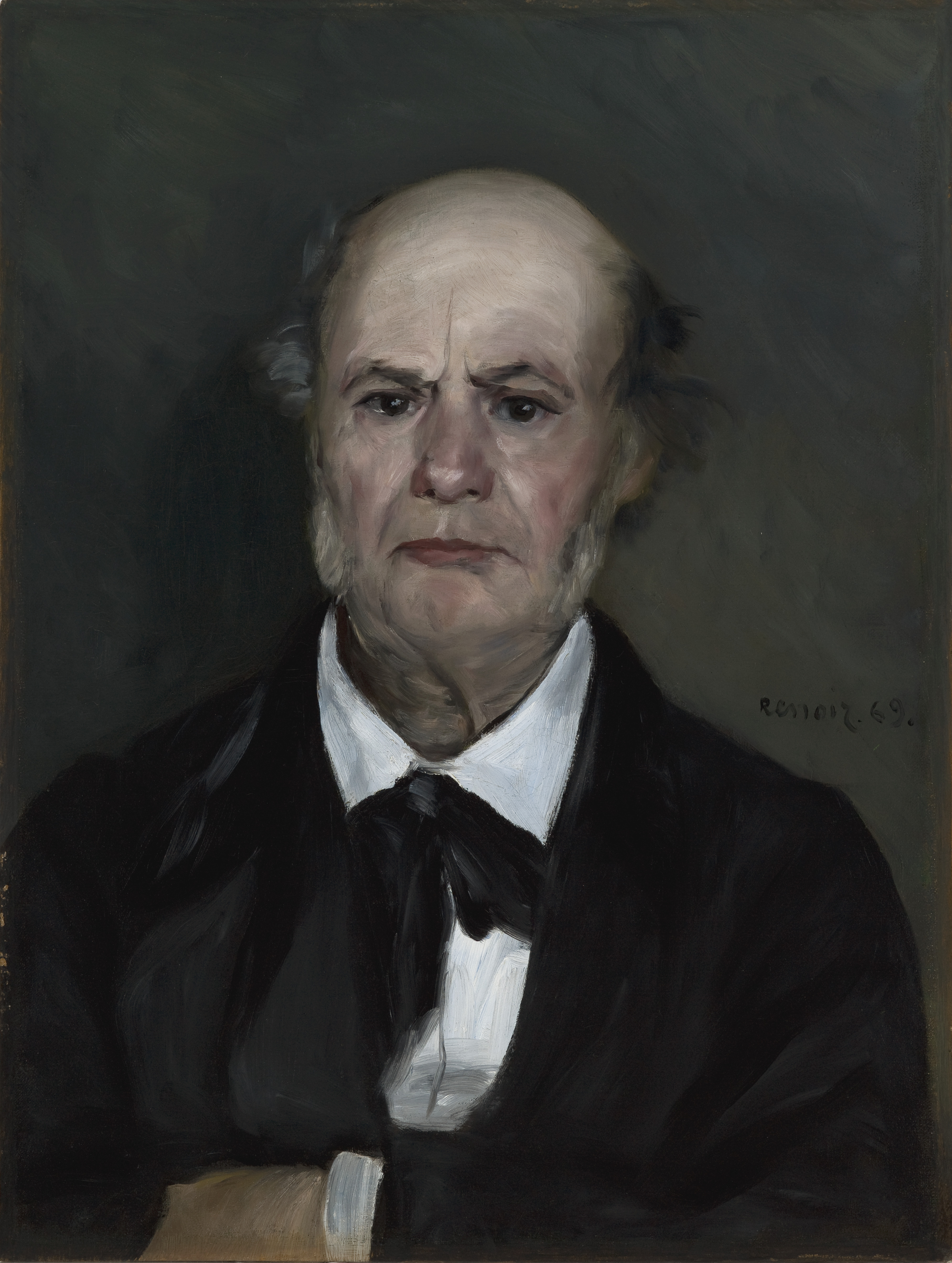
Pierre-Auguste Renoir, Léonard Renoir, The Artist's Father, 1869

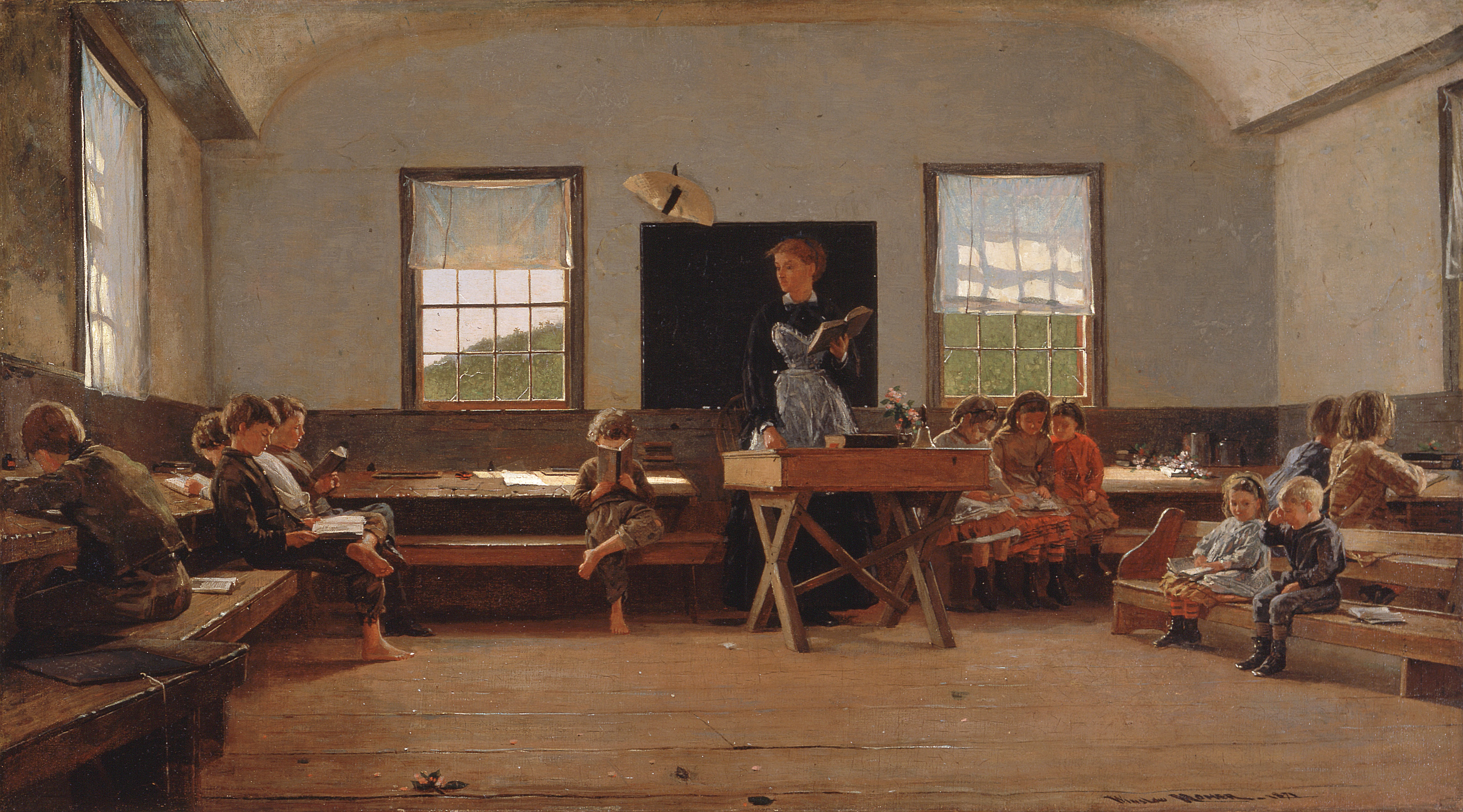
Winslow Homer, The Country School, 1871

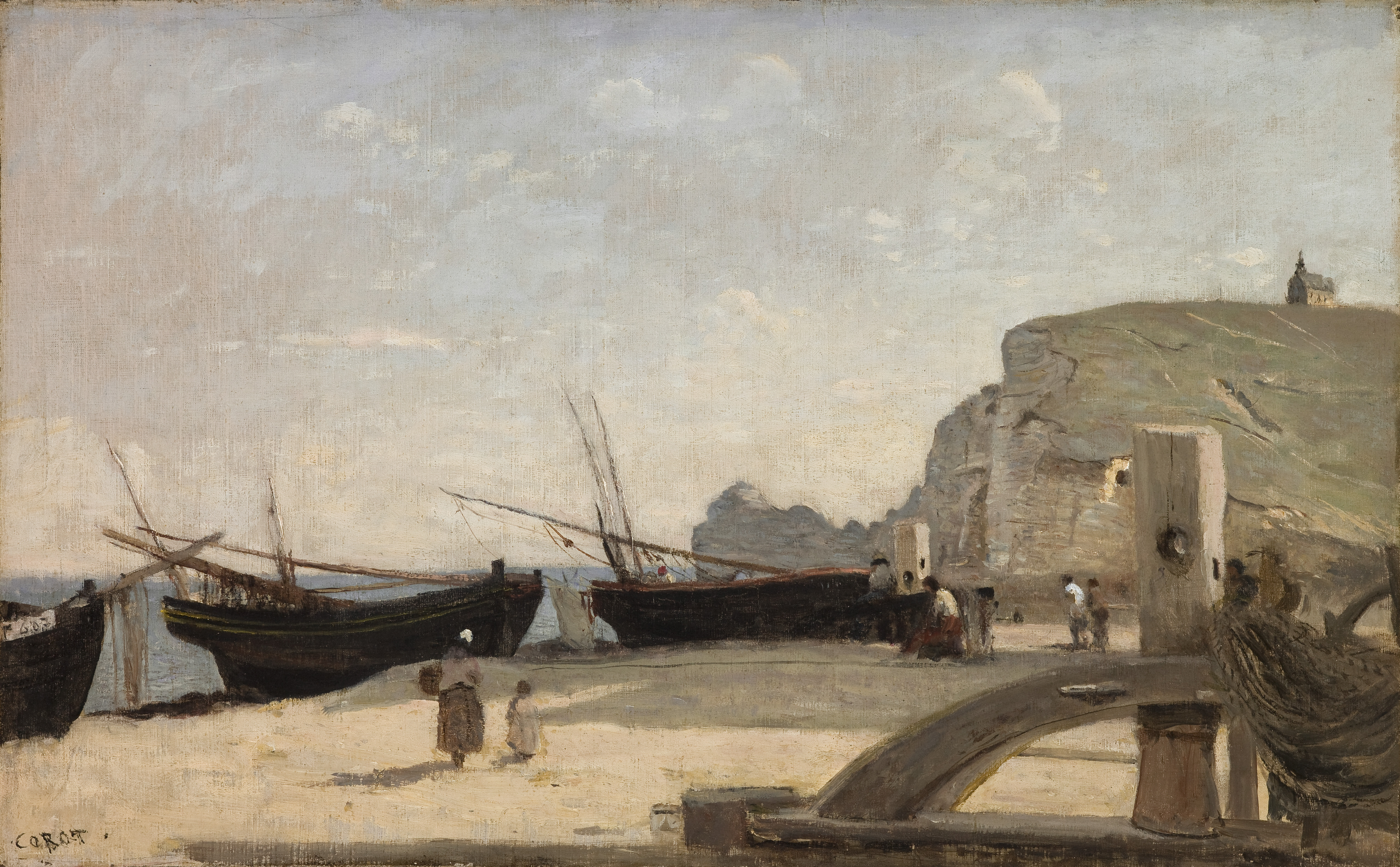
Jean-Baptiste-Camille Corot, The Beach, Étretat, 1872

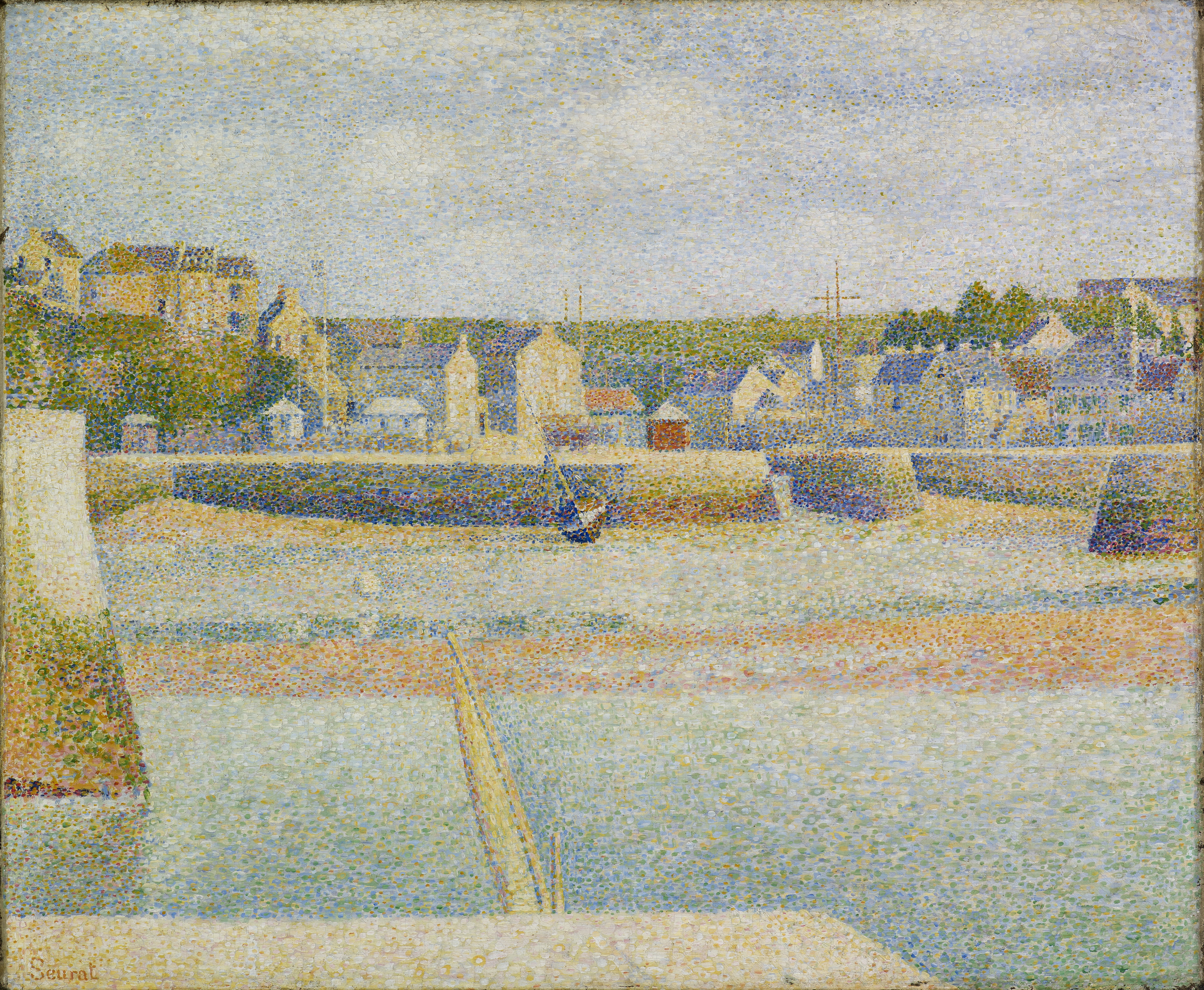
Georges Seurat, Port-en-Bessin, The Outer Harbor (Low Tide), 1888

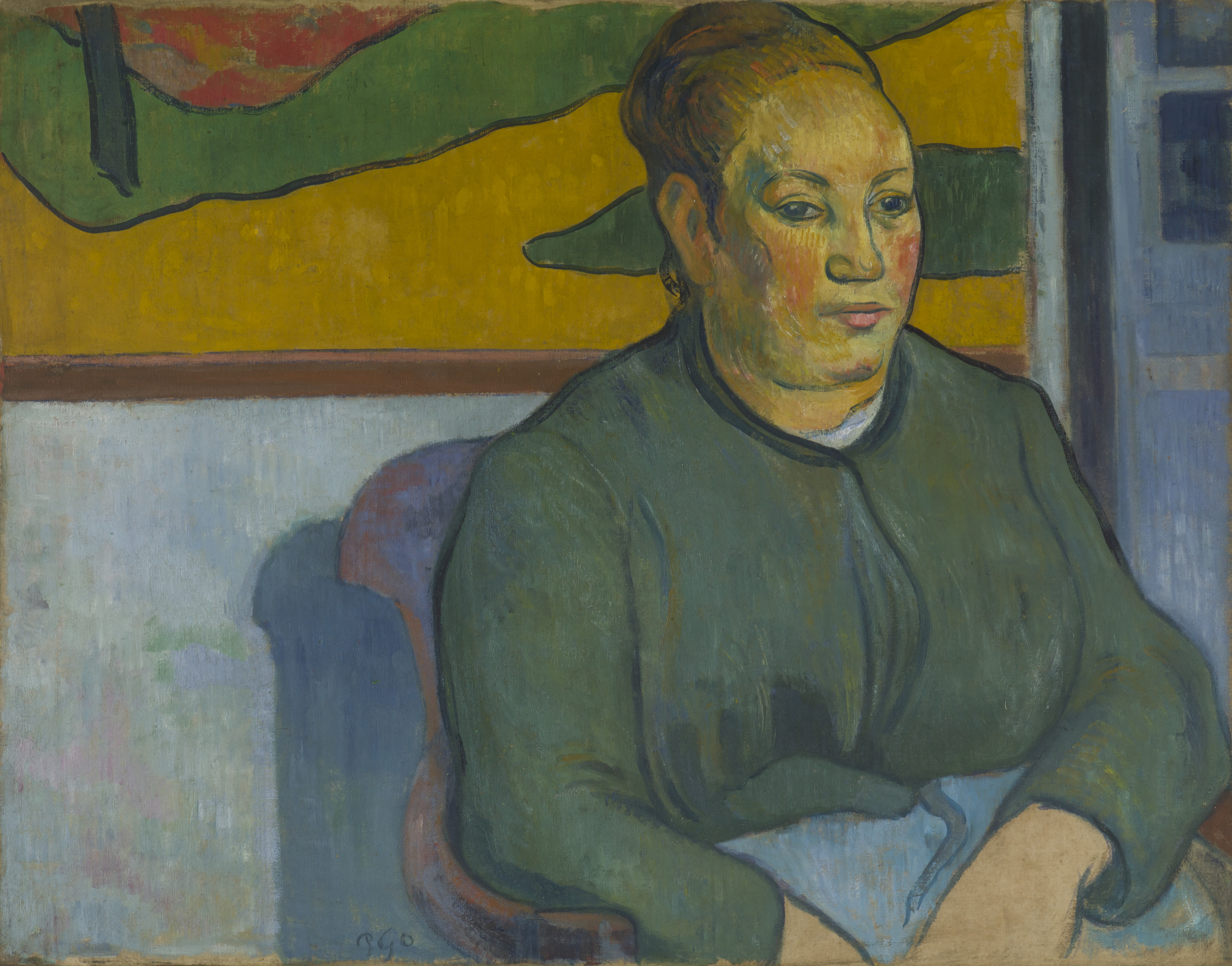
Paul Gauguin, Madame Roulin, 1888

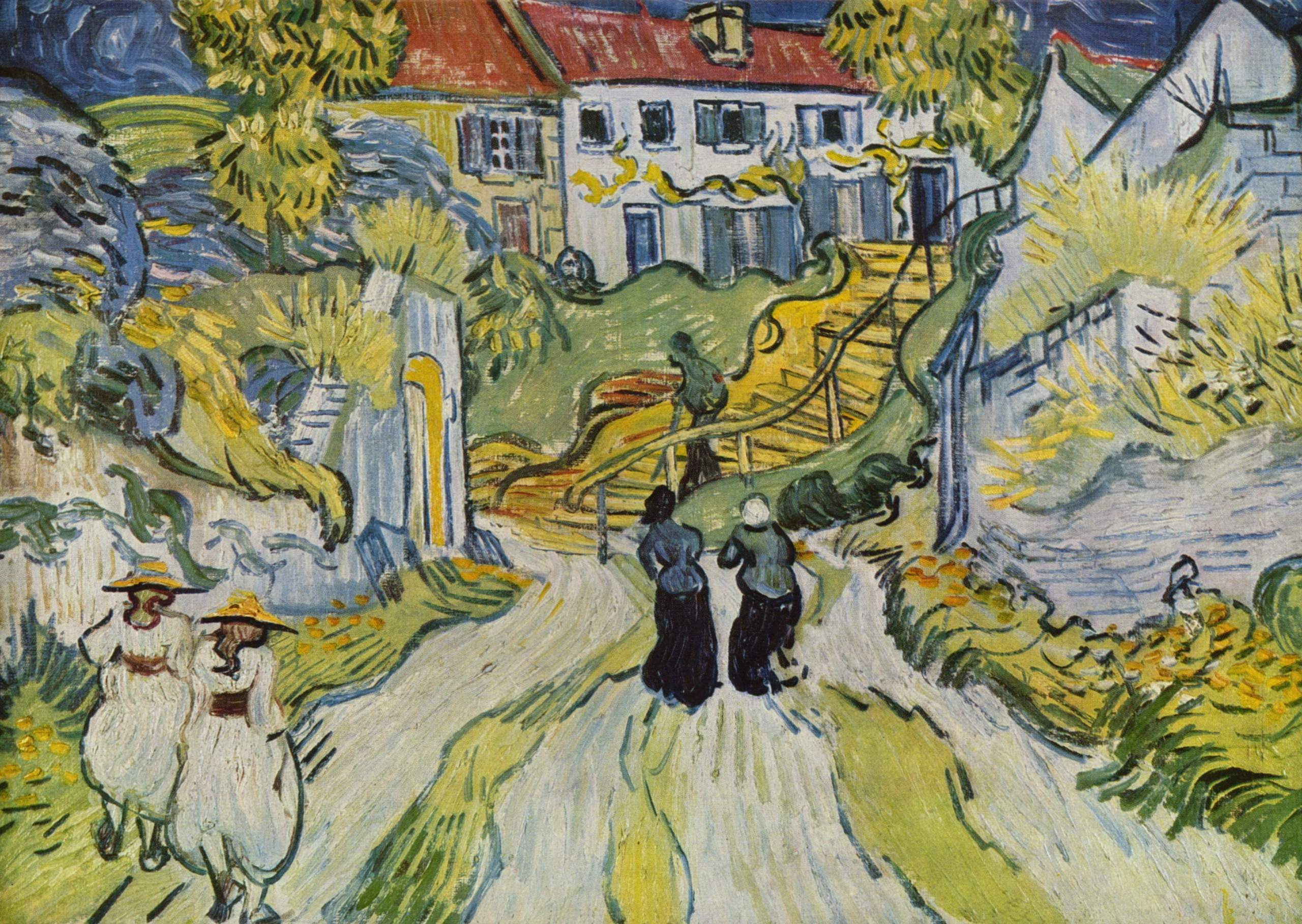
Vincent van Gogh, Stairway at Auvers, 1890

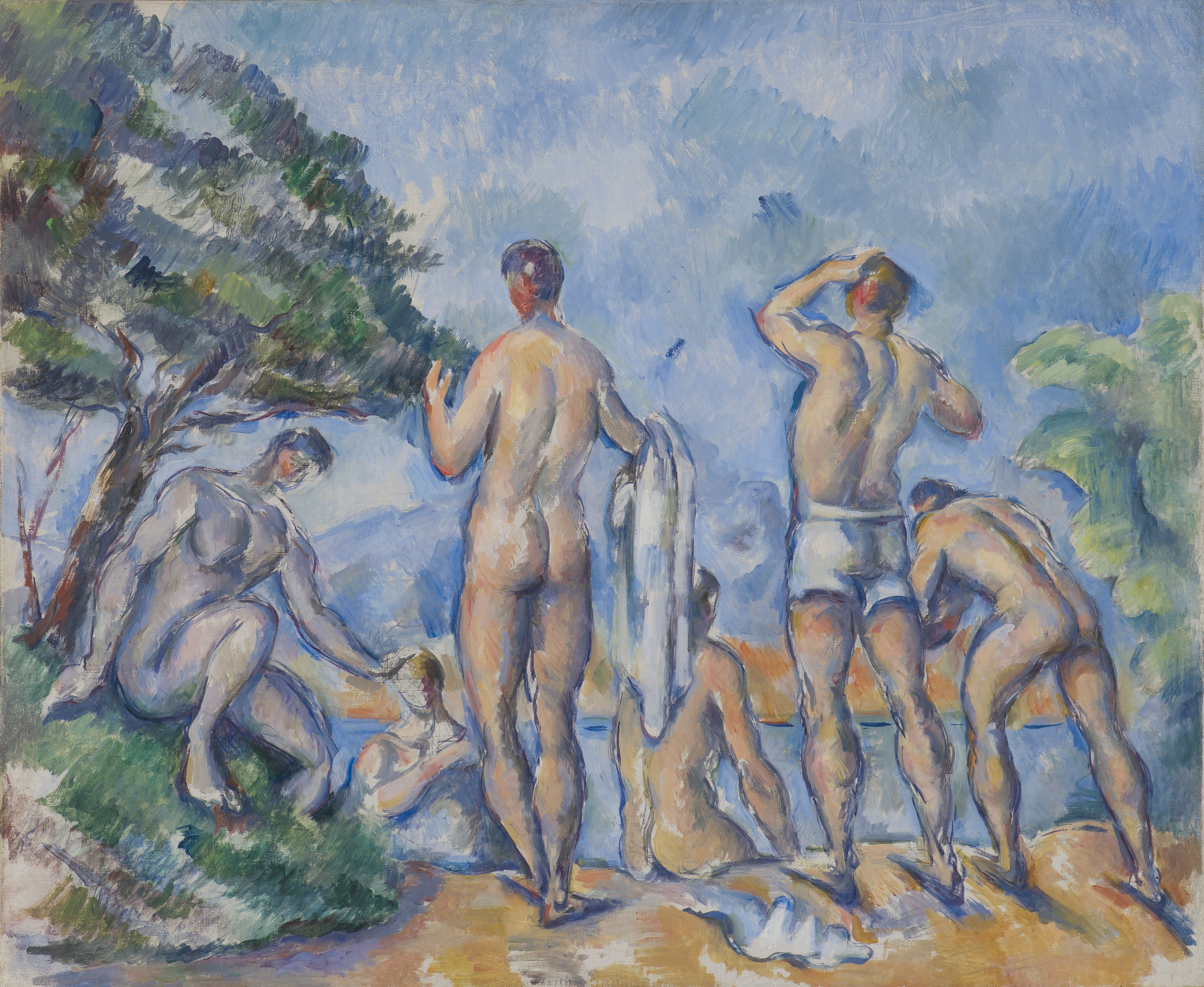
Paul Cézanne, Bathers, 1890–92

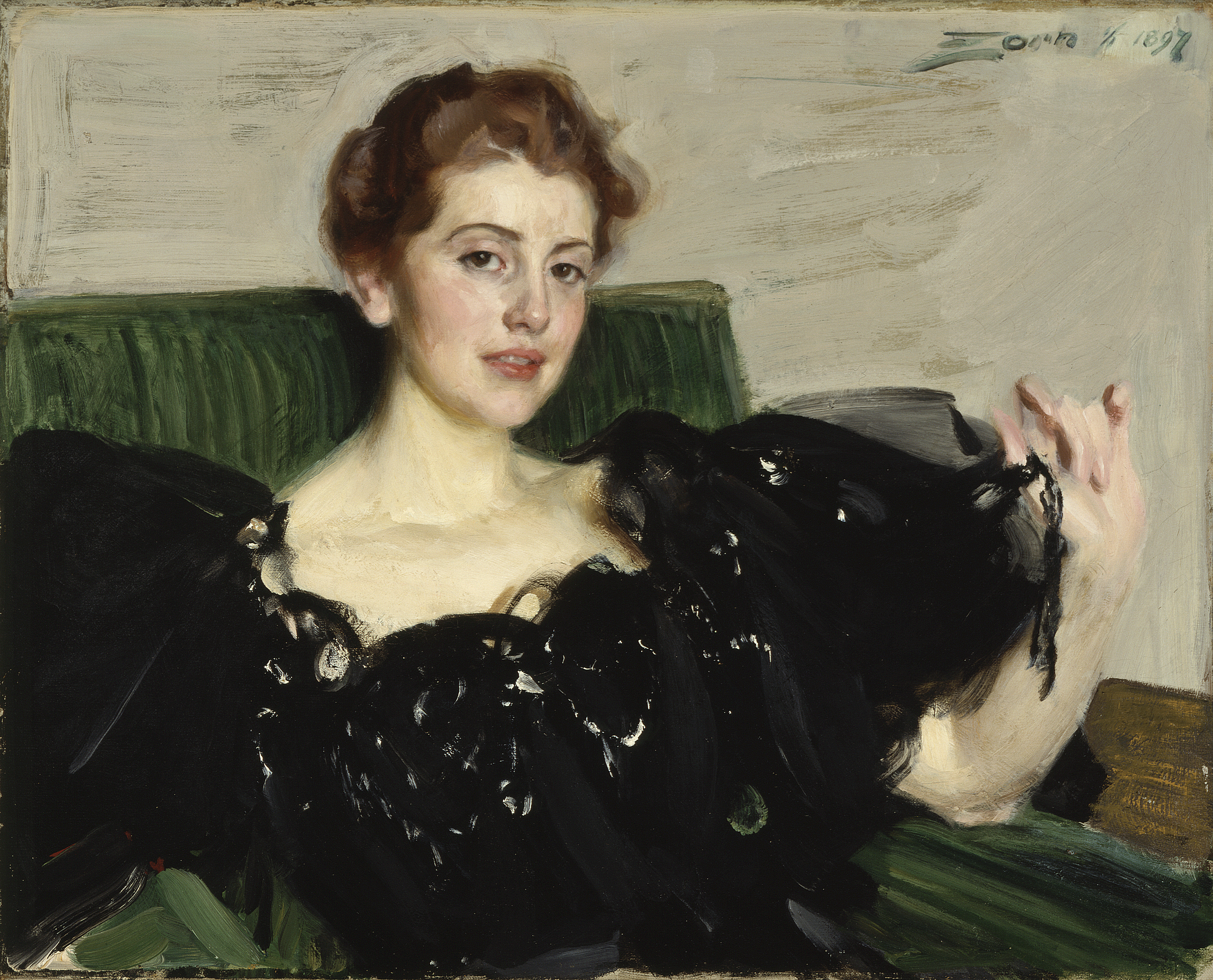
Anders Zorn, Lucy Turner Joy, 1897

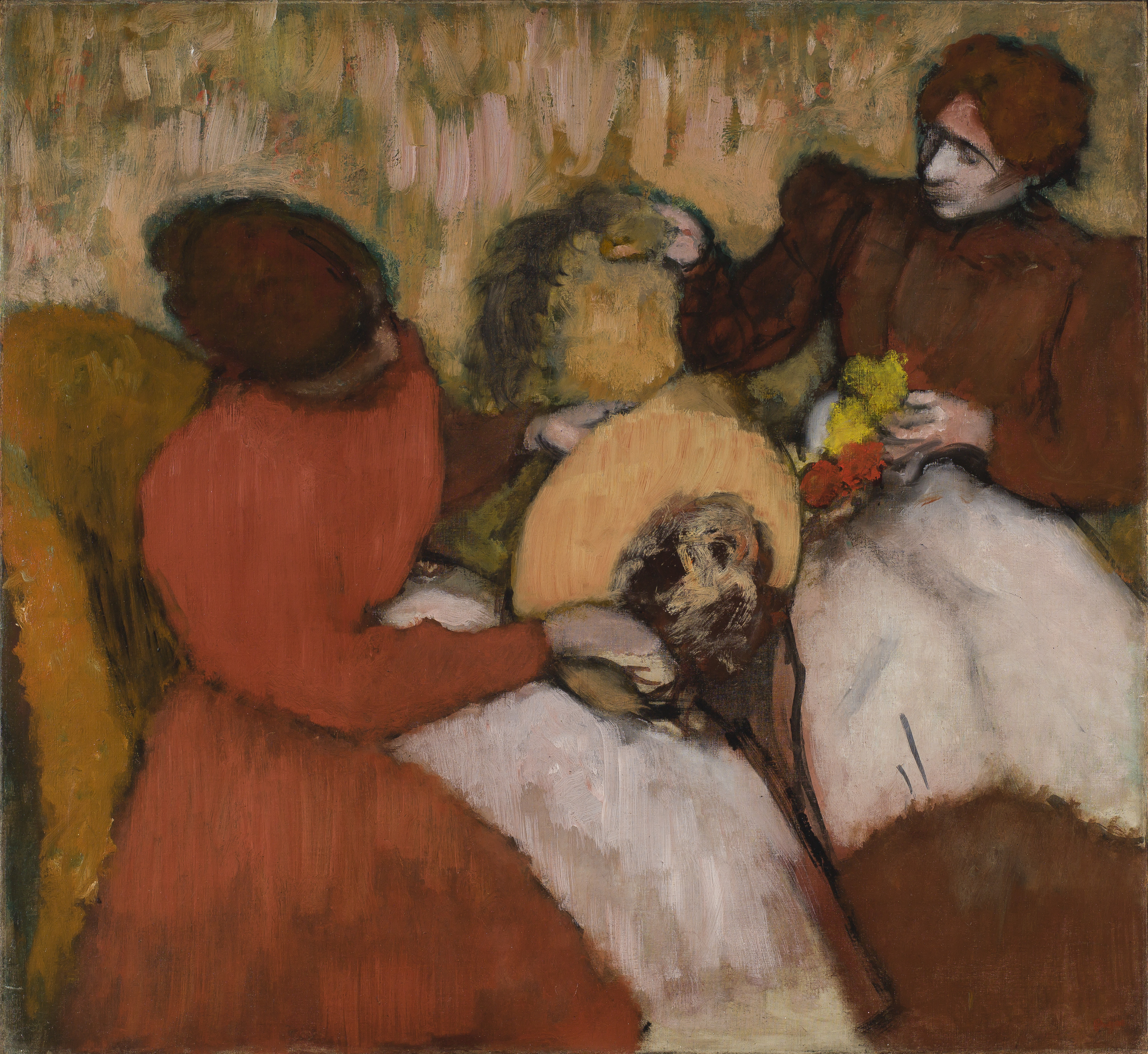
Edgar Degas, The Milliners, 1898

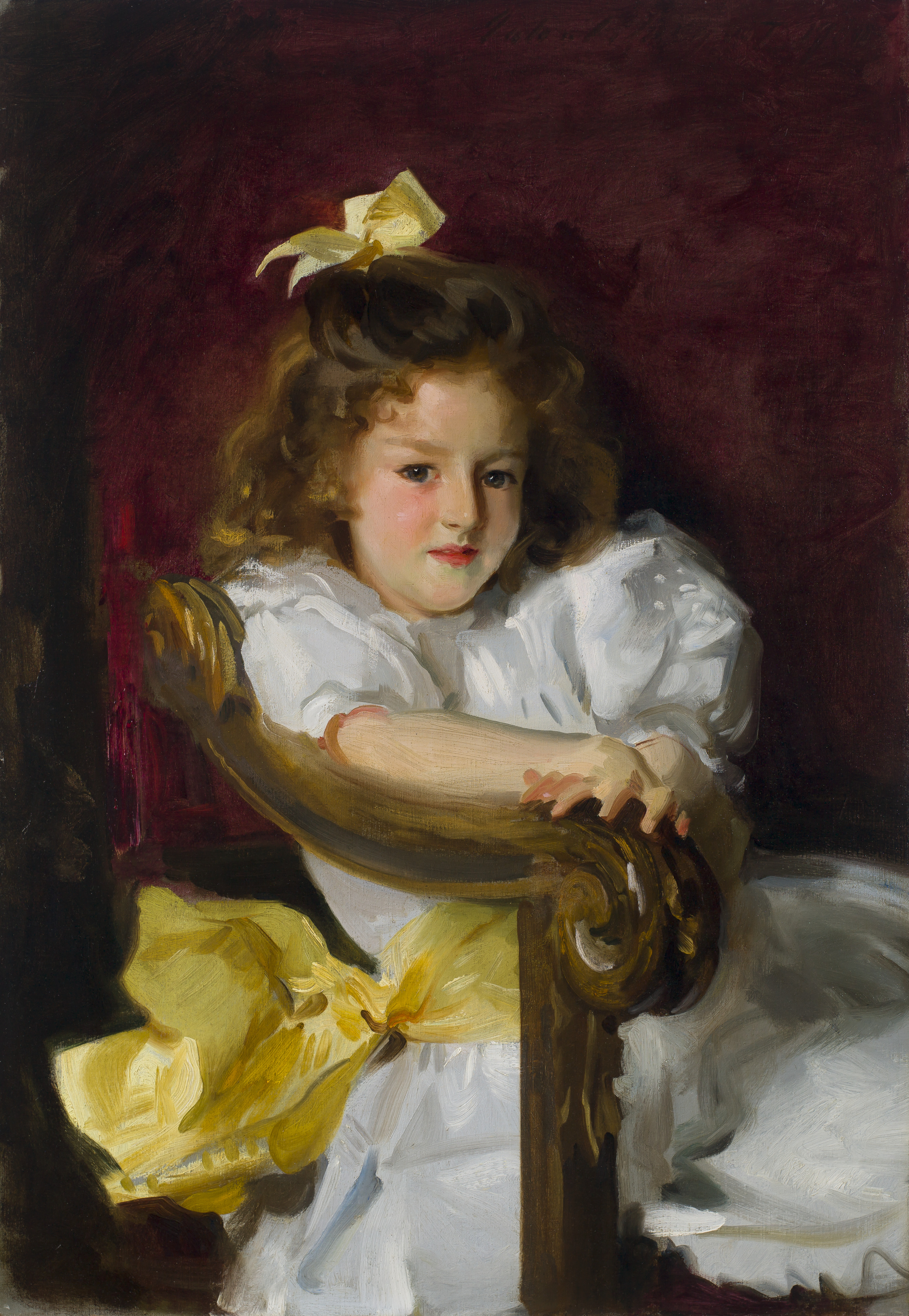
John Singer Sargent, Portrait of Charlotte Cram, 1900

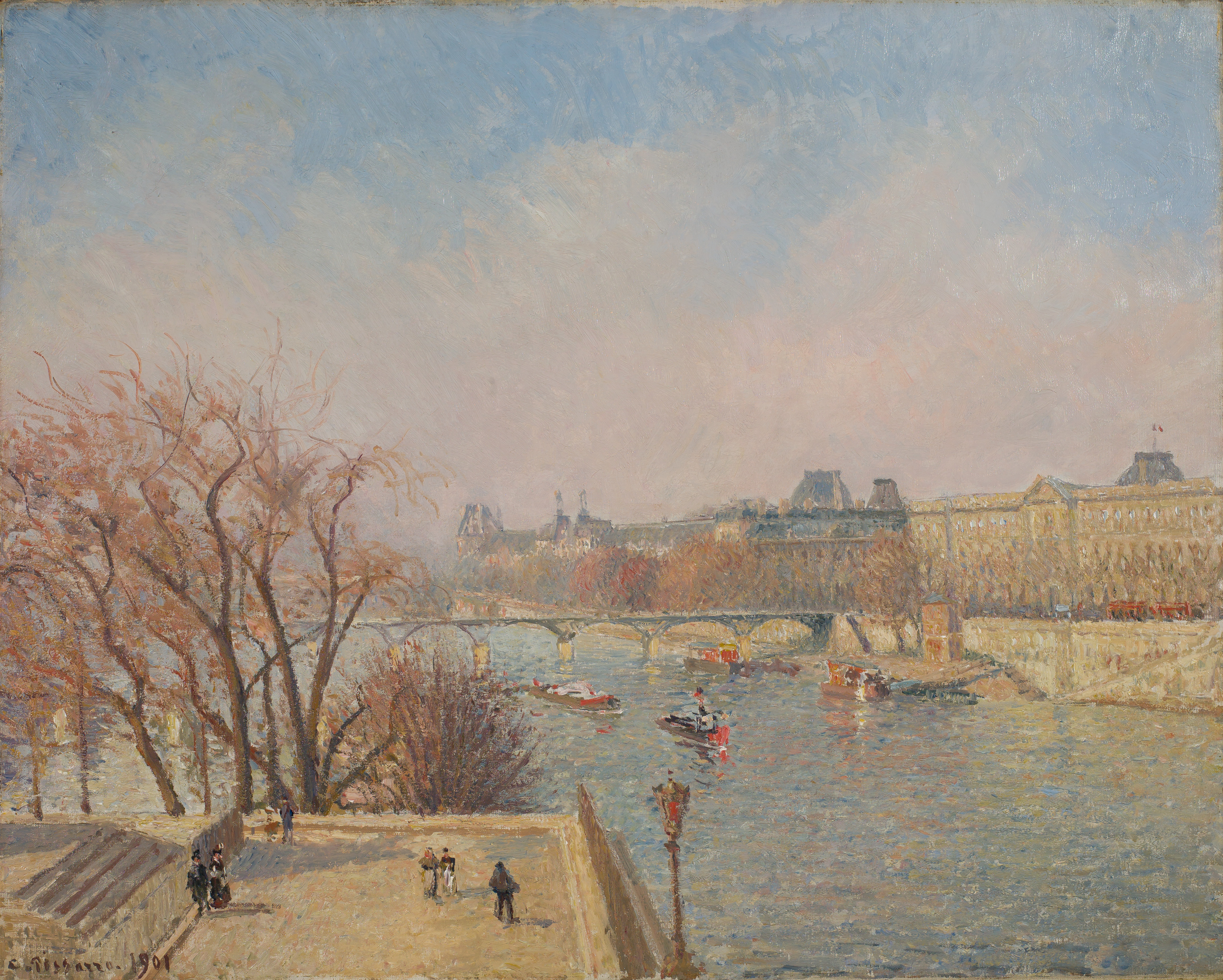
Camille Pissarro, The Louvre, Morning, Sunlight, 1901

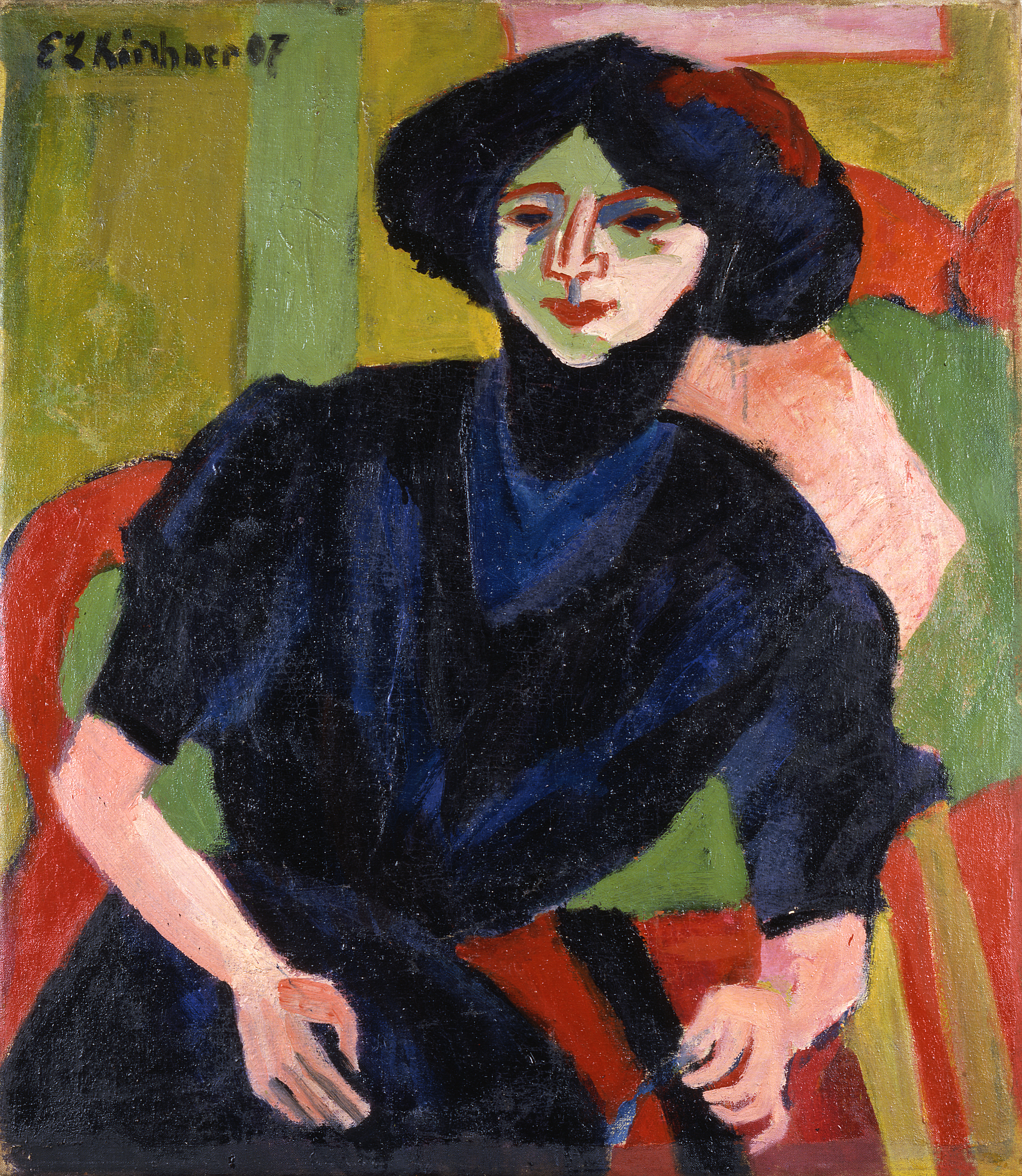
Ernst Ludwig Kirchner, Portrait of Gerti, 1911

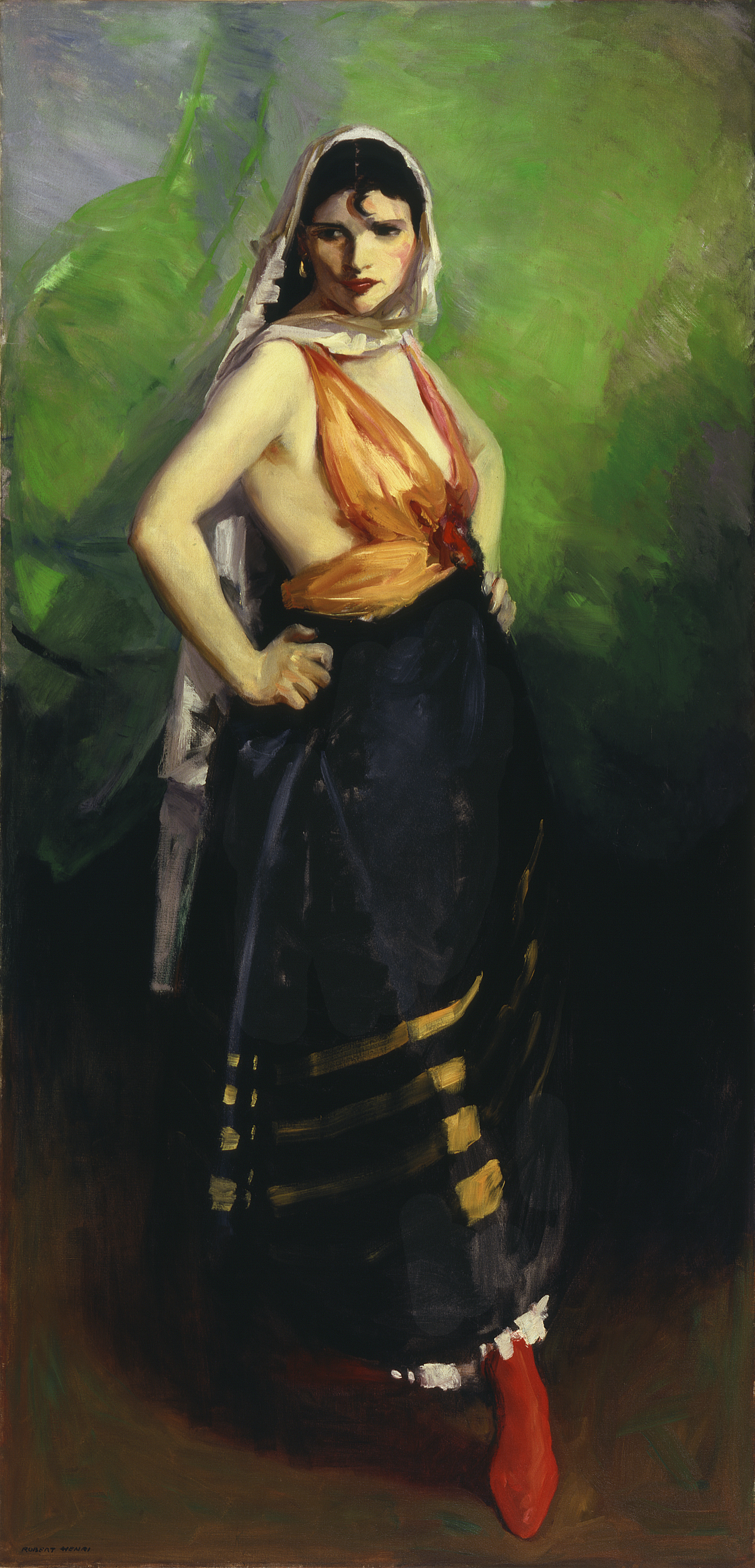
Robert Henri, Betalo Rubino, Dramatic Dancer, 1916

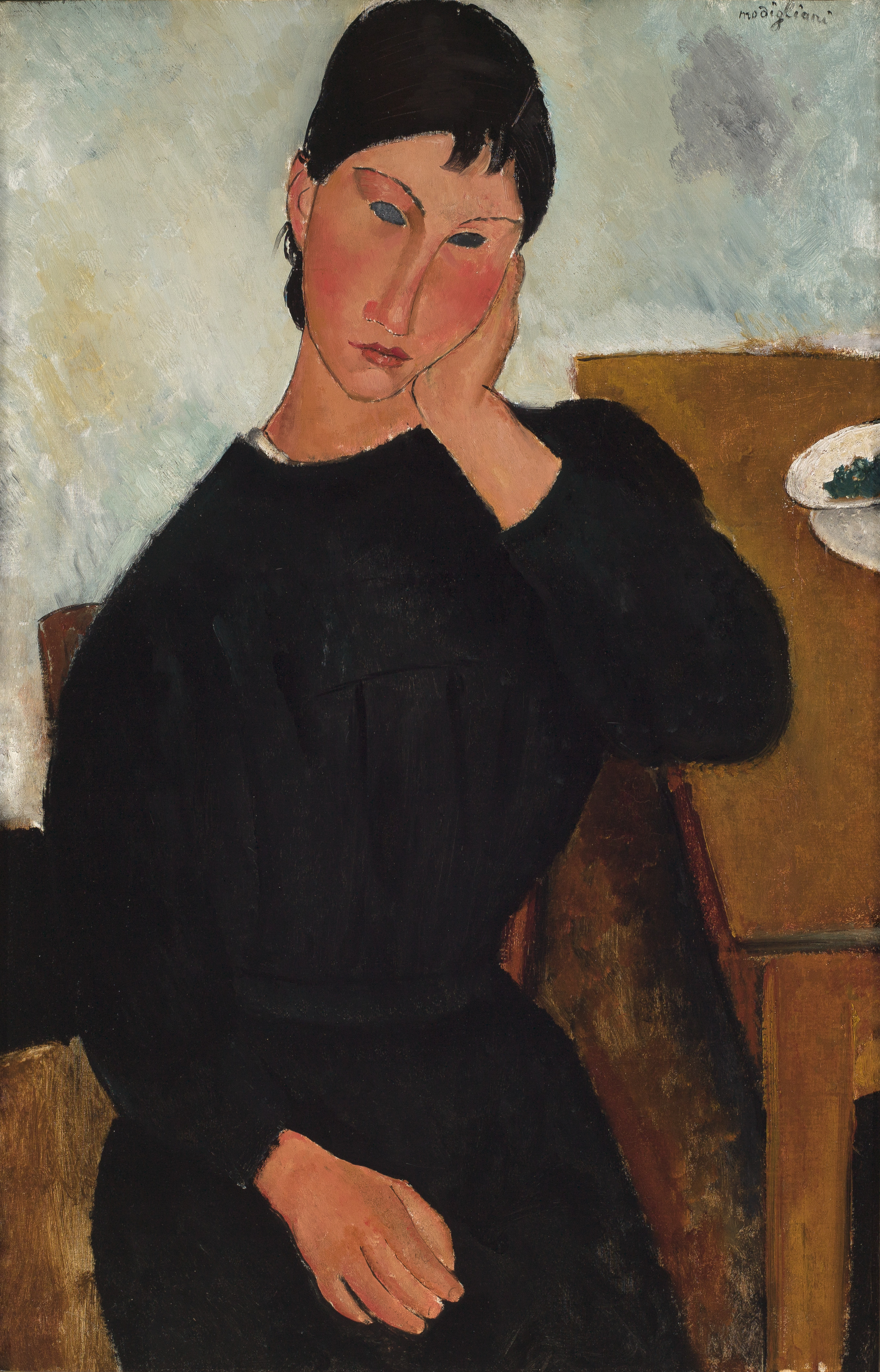
Amedeo Modigliani, Elvira Resting at a Table, 1919

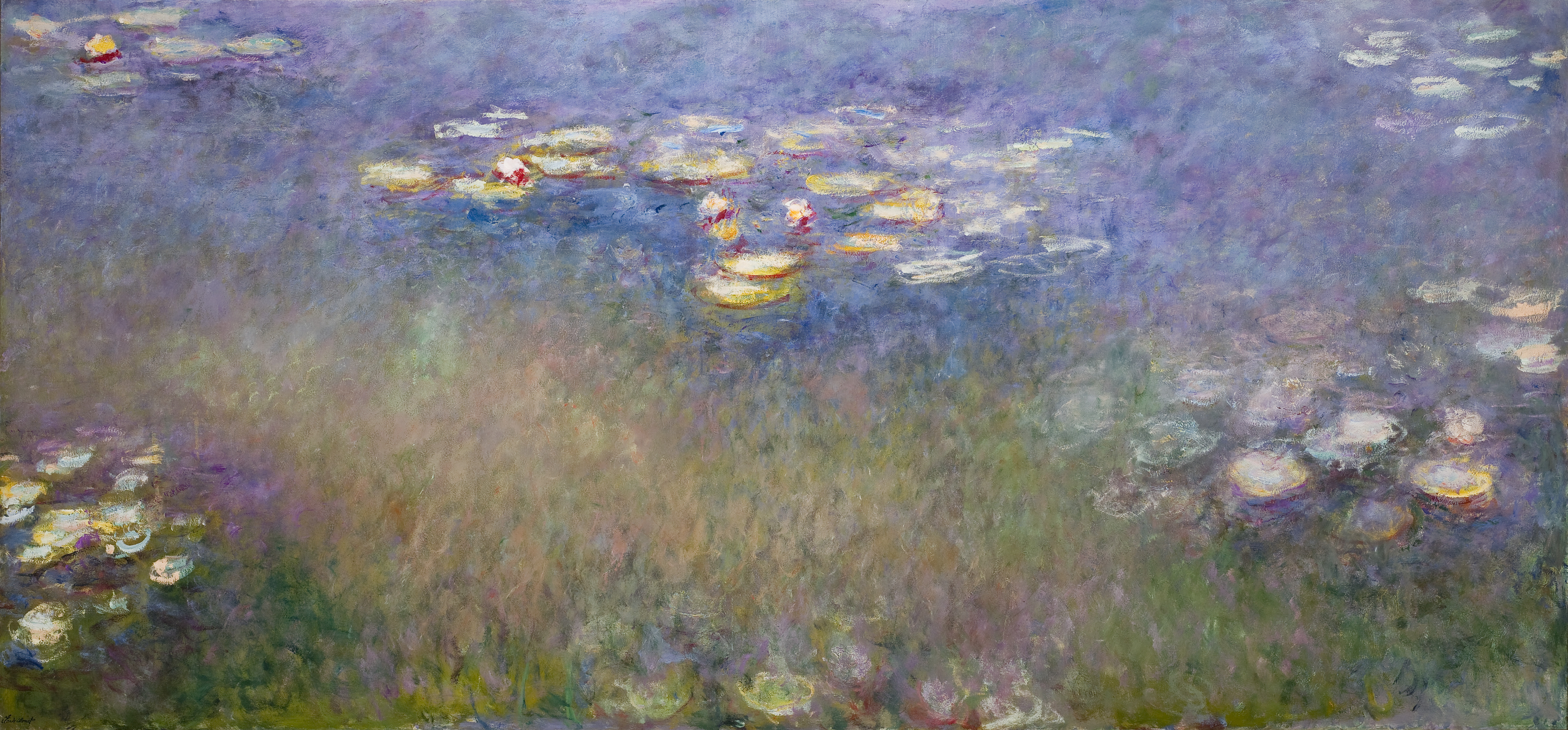
Claude Monet, Water Lilies, 1915–26

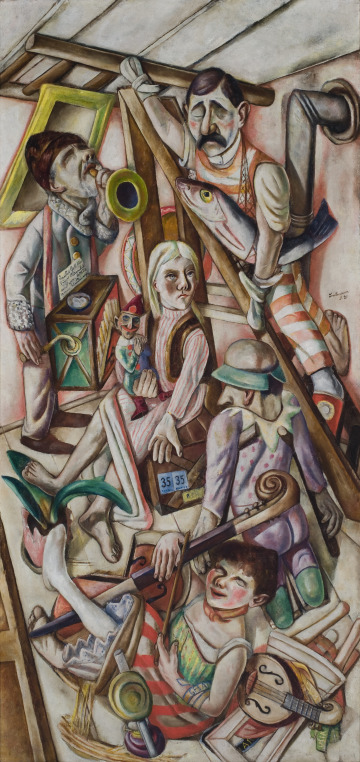
Max Beckmann, The Dream, 1921

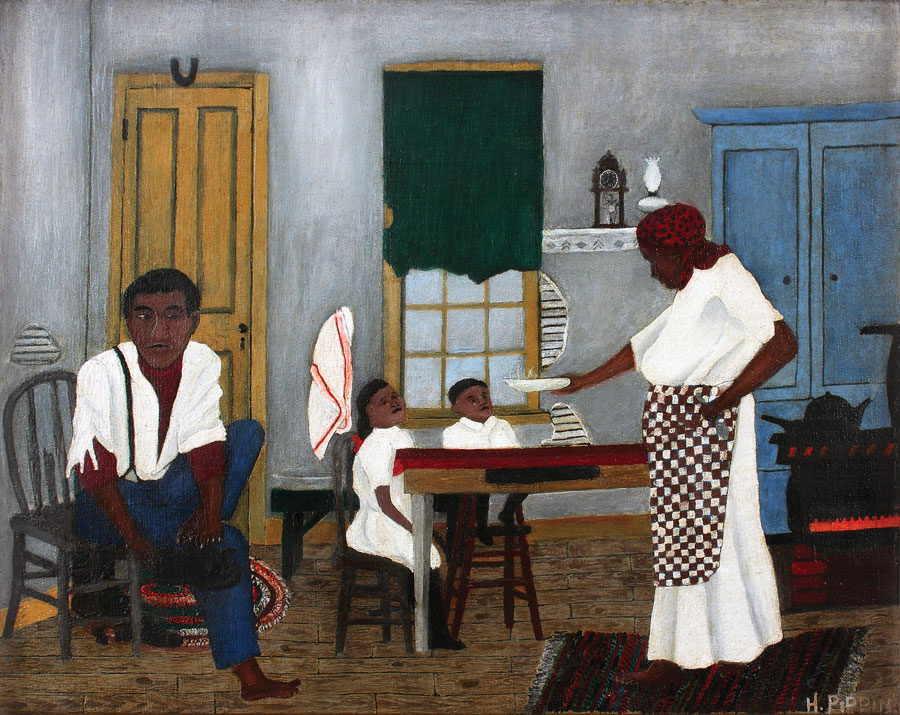
Horace Pippin, Sunday Morning Breakfast, 1943

== Exhibitions ==
=== 2026 ===
- (November 6, 2026 – August 15, 2027) Unsettling the City : Julie Mehretu’s “Epigraph, Damascus”
- (October 17, 2026 – January 10, 2027) Women Impressionists and the Land
- (October 2, 2026 – March 28, 2027) Quilts and Coverlets : American Needlework in White
- (June 12, 2026 – January 24, 2027) Picturing Independence
- (April 10, 2026 –October 18, 2026) Visions of Antiquity
- (March 20 – June 28, 2026) Martine Syms: Soliloquy
- (March 14, 2026 –August 16, 2026) Ancient Splendor : Roman Art in the Time of Trajan
- (February 6, 2026 – August 9, 2026) Currents 125: Blas Isasi
- (January 30, 2026 – September 13, 2026) Aymara Weavings: The Indigenous Andes

=== 2025 ===
- (November 7, 2025 – March 15, 2026) Always Modern : German Art and Design from the Collection
- (October 18, 2025 – January 25, 2026) Anselm Kiefer :Becoming the Sea
- (June 13, 2025 – January 4, 2026) Patterns of Luxury: Islamic Textiles, 11th–17th Centuries
- (May 2, 2025 –October 19, 2025) In Search of America: Photography and the Road Trip
- (April 12, 2025 – July 27, 2025) Roaring: Art, Fashion, and the Automobile in France, 1918–1939
- (March 21, 2025 –September 14, 2025) Grounded in Clay: The Spirit of Pueblo Pottery
- (February 28, 2025 –November 30, 2025) Manuel Mathieu: Pendulum

=== 2024 ===
- (November 8, 2024 – May 25, 2025) Bolts of Color: Printed Textiles after WWII
- (October 25, 2024 – March 9, 2025) Currents 124: Crystal Z Campbell
- (October 19, 2024 – February 16, 2025) Narrative Wisdom and African Arts
- (August 2, 2024 – April 13, 2025) The Work of Art: The Federal Art Project, 1935–1943
- (June 22, 2024 – September 1, 2024) Art and Imagination in Spanish America, 1500–1800: Highlights from LACMA’s Collection
- (May 3, 2024 – August 3, 2025) Jaune Quick-to-See Smith
- (May 3, 2024 – September 15, 2024) Romare Bearden: Resonances
- (April 5, 2024 – September 22, 2024) Currents 123: Tamara Johnson
- (March 29, 2024 – October 20, 2024) Shimmering Silks: Traditional Japanese Textiles, 18th–19th Centuries
- (March 15, 2024 – October 27, 2024) Concealed Layers: Uncovering Expressionist Paintings
- (February 23, 2024 – July 14, 2024) Native American Art of the 20th Century: The William P. Healey Collection
- (February 17, 2024 – May 12, 2024) Matisse and the Sea
- (January 12, 2024 – March 31, 2024) Wangechi Mutu: My Cave Call

=== 2023 ===
- (October 20, 2023 – April 7, 2024) Ellsworth Kelly
- (September 29, 2023 – March 10, 2024) Aso Oke: Prestige Cloth from Nigeria
- (August 19, 2023 – January 1, 2024) The Culture: Hip Hop and Contemporary Art in the 21st Century
- (June 24, 2023 – September 3, 2023) Action/Abstraction Redefined: Modern Native Art, 1940s–1970s
- (May 5, 2023 – May 4, 2025) Native Artist Collaboration: Faye HeavyShield
- (April 28, 2023 – December 17, 2023) Plants and Flowers in East Asian Art
- (April 15, 2023 –July 15, 2023) New Red Order’s : Give it Back: Stage Theory
- (April 14, 2023 –July 9, 2023) New to the Museum: Prints, Drawings, and Photographs
- (March 25, 2023 –June 25, 2023) Monet/Mitchell : Painting the French Landscape
- (February 18, 2023 – May 14, 2023) Age of Armor : Treasures from the Higgins Armory Collection at the Worcester Art Museum
- (January 6, 2023 –May 28, 2023) Fabricating Empire : Folk Textiles and the Making of Early 20th-Century Austrian Design

=== 2022 ===
- (November 18, 2022 – April 23, 2023) By the Light of the Silvery Moon: Japanese Art from the Collection
- (October 23, 2022 – January 8, 2023) Global Threads: The Art and Fashion of Indian Chintz
- (September 30, 2022 – February 19, 2023) Currents 122 : Meleko Mokgosi
- (September 16, 2022 – April 9, 2023) Samson Young: Sonata for Smoke
- (August 26, 2022 – November 26, 2023) Philip Guston
- (August 26, 2022 – February 26, 2023)Day & Dream in Modern Germany, 1914–1945
- (July 1, 2022 – December 18, 2022) Chinese Silk Textiles of the Ming and Qing Dynasties
- (June 26, 2022 - September 11, 2022) Catching the Moment : Contemporary Art from the Ted L. and Maryanne Ellison Simmons Collection
- (May 13, 2022 - August 14, 2022) Joan Miro
- (May 6, 2022 - September 11, 2022) Liliana Porter : Fox in the Mirror
- (April 15, 2022 – October 30, 2022) Precious Woods, Pure Enjoyment: Japanese Art from the 19th and 20th Centuries
- (April 1, 2022 – December 11, 2022)Memory Painting: Helen LaFrance and the American Landscape
- (March 18, 2022 - August 28, 2022) Currents 121 : Oscar Murillo
- (March 4, 2022 – December 11, 2022) Shifting Perspectives: New Views on Landscape
- (February 20, 2022 - May 15, 2022) Paintings on Stone : Science and the Sacred 1530-1800
- (February 1, 2022 - July 31, 2022) Impressionnism and Beyond
- (February 1, 2022 - May 1, 2022) Nuotama Frances Bodomo : Afronauts
- (February 1, 2022 - May 1, 2022) Pablo Picasso

=== 2021 ===
- (October 29, 2021 - April 24, 2022) Woodlands, Native American Art from St. Louis Collections
- (October 22, 2021 - April 10, 2022) Modern Japanese Military Art
- (October 7, 2021 - January 7, 2022) Art Along the River : A Bicentennial Celebration
- (September 17, 2021 - March 20, 2022) Damon Davis : All Hands on Deck
- (September 17, 2021- February 20, 2022) Currents 120 : Jess T. Dugan
- (August 20, 2021 - January 7, 2022) New Media Series : Nicholas Lowe
- (July 16, 202 - February 22, 2022) Oliver Lee Jackson
- (July 2, 2021 - January 2, 2022) Architectural Photography from the Collection, 1850-2000
- (April 18, 2021 - August 22, 2021) Nubia : Treasures of Ancient Africa
- (March 19, 2021 - October 17, 2021) Figural Subjects in Chinese Art
- (March 19, 2021 - October 3, 2021) Signed in Silk : Introducing a Sacred Jewish Textile
- (February 26, 2021 - August 15, 2021) Currents 119 : Dana Levy
- (February 26, 2021 - August 15, 2021) New Media Series : Dana Levy
- (February 19, 2021 - June 20, 2021) Methods and Materiality : Women Artists working with Abstraction

=== 2020 ===
- (November 20, 2020 – May 31, 2021) Buzz Spector: Alterations
- (November 8, 2020 – February 28, 2021) Storm of Progress: German Art after 1800 from the Saint Louis Art Museum
- (July 31, 2020 – January 31, 2021) Currents 118: Elias Sime
- (August 7 – November 15, 2020) New Media Series — Martine Syms
- (February 16 – May 17, 2020) Millet and Modern Art: From Van Gogh to Dalí
- (January 24 – August 2, 2020) New Media Series – Sky Hopinka
- (December 13, 2019 – November 22, 2020) Javanese Batik Textiles
- (September 17, 2019 – October 11, 2020) The Shape of Abstraction: Selections from the Ollie Collection

=== 2019 ===
- (November 15, 2019 – March 8, 2020) Currents 117: Dave Hullfish Bailey
- (November 1, 2019 – January 19, 2020) New Media Series–Clarissa Tossin
- (October 20, 2019 – January 12, 2020) Dutch Painting in the Age of Rembrandt from the Museum of Fine Arts, Boston
- (July 21 – September 15, 2019) Paul Gauguin: The Art of Invention
- (May 31 – October 27, 2019) The Bauhaus and its Legacy: Oskar Schlemmer's Triadic Ballet
- (May 24 – December 1, 2019) Printing the Pastoral: Visions of the Countryside in 18th-Century Europe
- (April 26 – August 25, 2019) Poetics of the Everyday: Amateur Photography, 1890–1970
- (March 17 – June 9, 2019) Rachel Whiteread
- (February 22 – May 27, 2019) New Media Series – Oliver Laric
- (February 22 – May 27, 2019) Currents 116: Oliver Laric

=== 2018 ===
- (December 14, 2018 – May 5, 2019) Southwest Weavings: 800 Years of Artistic Exchange
- (November 30, 2018 – March 31, 2019) Printing Abstraction
- (November 11, 2018 – February 3, 2019) Graphic Revolution: American Prints 1960 to Now
- (October 19, 2018 – February 10, 2019) Kehinde Wiley: Saint Louis
- (October 5, 2018 – February 17, 2019) New Media Series–Renée Green
- (June 15 – November 25, 2018) Balance and Opposition in Ancient Peruvian Textiles
- (April 20 – July 15, 2018) Currents 115: Jennifer Bornstein
- (April 20 – September 30, 2018) New Media Series: Cyprian Gaillard
- (March 25 – September 9, 2018) Sunken Cities: Egypt's Lost Worlds
- (March 30 – September 30, 2018) Chinese Buddhist Art, 10th–15th Centuries

=== 2017 ===
- (December 22 – May 28, 2018) Greek Island Embroideries
- (November 5 – January 21, 2018) Thomas Struth: Nature & Politics
- (November 17, 2017 – February 4, 2018) Currents 114: Matt Saunders
- (November 17 – April 15, 2018) New Media Series—Ben Thorp Brown
- (September 15 – March 18, 2018) Fired Up: Ink Painting and Contemporary Ceramics from Japan
- (August 11, 2017 – January 28, 2018) A Century of Japanese Prints
- (July 14 – November 12, 2017) New Media Series: Amy Granat
- (June 25 – September 17, 2017) Reigning Men: Fashion in Menswear, 1715-2015
- (May 26 – November 26, 2017) Cross-Pollination: Flowers in 18th-Century European Porcelain and Textiles
- (April 1 – June 25, 2017) Currents 113: Shimon Attie Lost in Space (After Huck)
- (April 21 – September 4, 2017) The Hats of Stephen Jones
- (March 24 – June 25, 2017) New Media Series: Shimon Attie
- (March 3 – July 30, 2017) Learning to See: Renaissance and Baroque Masterworks from the Phoebe Dent Weil and Mark S. Weil Collection
- (March 10 – September 4, 2017) In the Realm of Trees: Photographs, Paintings, and Scholar's Objects from the Collection
- (February 12 – May 7, 2017) Degas, Impressionism, and the Paris Millinery Trade

=== 2016 ===
- (December 16 – March 19, 2017) New Media Series: Rodney McMillian
- (October 16, 2016 – January 8, 2017) Conflicts of Interest: Art and War in Modern Japan
- (September 2 – December 11) New Media Series: Dara Birnbaum
- (September 9 – April 30, 2017) Textiles: Politics and Patriotism
- (August 5, 2016 – February 12, 2017) Impressions of War
- (August 19, 2016 – February 12, 2017) Japanese Painting and Calligraphy: Highlights from the Collection
- (June 19 – September 11, 2016) Self-Taught Genius: Treasures from the American Folk Art Museum
- (April 1 – August 21, 2016) From Caravans to Courts: Textiles from the Silk Road
- (March 6 – May 8, 2016) The Carpet and the Connoisseur: The James F. Ballard Collection of Oriental Rugs
- (March 24 – June 19, 2016) Currents 112: AndrÃ©a Stanislav: Convergence Infinité
- (March 11 – August 14, 2016) Real and Imagined Landscapes in Chinese Art
- (January 29 – July 17, 2016) A Decade of Collecting Prints, Drawings, and Photographs

=== 2015 ===
- (September 18, 2015 – March 20, 2016) Blow-Up: Graphic Abstraction in 1960s Design
- (November 8, 2015 – January 31, 2016) St. Louis Modern
- (November 6, 2015 – March 13, 2016) New Media Series—Ana Mendieta: Alma, Silueta en Fuego
- (October 23, 2015 – February 14, 2016) Currents 111: Steven and William Ladd: Scouts or Sports?
- (September 4, 2015 – March 6, 2016) Journey to the Interior: Ink Painting from Japan
- (July 17 – November 1, 2015) New Media Series—Alex Prager: Face in the Crowd
- (July 31, 2015 – January 3, 2016) The Artist and the Modern Studio
- (June 28 – September 27, 2015) Senufo: Art and Identity in West Africa
- (April 8 – July 12, 2015) Currents 110: Mariam Ghani
- (April 17 – July 19, 2015) Beyond Bosch: The Afterlife of a Renaissance Master in Print
- (March 20 – September 7, 2015) Adorning Self and Space: West African Textiles
- (February 22 – May 17, 2015) Navigating the West: George Caleb Bingham and the River
- (February 27 – August 30, 2015) Creatures Great and Small: Animals in Japanese Art
- (February 7 – September 20, 2015) Thomas Cole's Voyage of Life

=== 2014 ===
- (December 12, 2014 – May 10, 2015) Vija Celmins: "Intense Realism"
- (November 21, 2014 – April 5, 2015) Scenic Wonder: An Early American Journey Down the Hudson River
- (November 21, 2014 – April 5, 2015) Nicholas Nixon: 40 Years of The Brown Sisters
- (October 12, 2014 – January 5, 2015) Atua: Sacred Gods from Polynesia
- (October 31, 2014 – March 8, 2015) Currents 109: Nick Cave
- (September 12, 2014 – February 22, 2015) Calligraphy in Chinese and Japanese Art
- (August 1 – October 19, 2014) New Media Series—Janaina Tsch¨pe: The Ocean Within
- (August 29 – November 2, 2014) Louis IX: King, Saint, Namesake
- (July 4, 2014 – February 22, 2015) Facets of the Three Jewels: Tibetan Buddhist Art from the Collections of George E. Hibbard and the Saint Louis Art Museum
- (June 20 – December 7, 2014) Brett Weston: Photographs
- (May 24 – September 14, 2014) Tragic and Timeless: The Art of Mark Rothko
- (April 11 – July 27, 2014) Currents 108: Won Ju Lim
- (March 16 – July 14, 2014) Impressionist France: Visions of Nation from Le Gray to Monet
- (March 28 – September 7, 2014) Sight Lines: Richard Serra's Drawings for Twain
- (February 26 – August 10, 2014) Anything but Civil: Kara Walker's Vision of the Old South
- (February 7 – September 7, 2014) Flowers of the Four Seasons in Chinese and Japanese Art
- (January 10 – March 30, 2014) New Media Series — Marco Brambilla: Evolution (Megaplex)
- (January 24 – June 15, 2014) Life Cycles: Isabella Kirkland's Taxa
- (January 21 – June 22, 2014) Mother Earth, Father Sky: Textiles from the Navajo World

=== 2013 ===
- (November 8, 2013 – February 16, 2014) The Weight of Things: Photographs by Paul Strand and Emmet Gowin
- (October 4, 2013 – February 2, 2014) Chiura Obata: Four Paintings, Four Moods
- (September 27, 2013 – January 5, 2014) Currents 107: Renata Stih & Frieder Schnock
- (June 29 – September 2, 2013) Yoko Ono: Wish Tree
- (June 29, 2013 – January 19, 2014) Encounters Along the Missouri River: the 1858 Sketchbooks of Charles Ferdinand Wimar
- (June 29, 2013 –January 26, 2014) Postwar German Art in the Collection
- (June 29, 2013 – January 26, 2014) A New View: Contemporary Art
- (May 3 – September 8, 2013) New Media Series—Hiraki Sawa: Migration
- (April 26 – October 27, 2013) Mantegna to Man Ray: Six Explorations in Prints, Drawings, and Photographs
- (March 5, 2013 – January 12, 2014) Highlights of the Textile Collection
- (February 8 – April 28, 2013) New Media Series—William E. Jones: "Killed"
- (January 18 – June 14, 2013) Focus on the Collection—Edward Curtis: Visions of Native America

=== 2012 ===
- (November 2, 2012 – January 27, 2013) New Media Series—James Nares: Street
- (October 21, 2012 – January 20, 2013) Federico Barocci: Renaissance Master
- (September 14, 2012 – January 13, 2013) Focus on the Collection: Drawn in Copper, Italian Prints in the Age of Barocci
- (July 13 – October 21, 2012) New Media Series—Laleh Khorramian: Water Panics in the Sea
- (June 8 – September 3, 2012) Restoring an American Treasure:The Panorama of the Monumental Grandeur of the Mississippi Valley
- (June 15 – December 31, 2012) Plants and Flowers in Chinese Paintings and Ceramics
- (May 4 – August 26, 2012) Harper's Pictorial History of the Civil War, (Annotated) by Kara Walker
- (April 6 – July 1, 2012) Currents 106: Chelsea Knight
- (February 19 – May 13, 2012) An Orchestrated Vision: The Theater of Contemporary Photography
- (January 13 – March 25, 2012) New Media Series—Teresa Hubbard/Alexander Birchler: Single Wide
- (January 13 – April 8, 2012) At the Crossroads: Exploring Black Identity in Contemporary Art
- (January 20 – April 29, 2012) The First Act: Staged Photography Before 1980

=== 2011 ===
- (October 2, 2011 – January 22, 2012) Monet's Water Lilies
- (October 14, 2011 – January 15, 2012) Focus on the Collection: Expressionist Landscape
- (September 9, 2011 – January 8, 2012) New Media Series—Guido van der Werve: Number Twelve: Variations on a Theme
- (July 15 – October 9, 2011) Focus on the Collection: Francesco Clemente's High Fever
- (June 12 – August 21, 2011) Restoring an American Treasure: The Panorama of the Monumental Grandeur of the Mississippi Valley
- (June 17 – September 5, 2011) New Media Series—Martha Colburn: Triumph of the Wild
- (April 8 – July 31, 2011) Currents 105: Ian Monroe
- (April 15 – July 10, 2011) Focus on the Collection: Engraving in Renaissance Germany
- (February 13 – May 8, 2011) Fiery Pool: The Maya and the Mythic Sea
- (February 25 – June 19, 2011) Visual Musing: Prints by William Kentridge
- (January 14 – April 10, 2011) Aaron Douglas
- (January 14 – April 10, 2011) Glimpsing History through Art: Selections from the Charles and Rosalyn Lowenhaupt Collection of Japanese Prints
- (January 28 – June 5, 2011) New Media Series—William Kentridge: Two Films

=== 2010 ===
- (October 10, 2010 – January 2, 2011) Joe Jones: Painter of the American Scene
- (October 22, 2010 – January 16, 2011) New Media Series—Pae White: Dying Oak
- (September 24, 2010 – January 9, 2011) Portrait of Depression-Era America
- (July 16 – October 17, 2010) New Media Series—Laurent Grasso, The Birds
- (June 20 – September 6, 2010) Bill Viola: Visitation
- (June 20 – September 6, 2010) The Mourners: Tomb Sculptures from the Court of Burgundy
- (June 25 – September 19, 2010) Form in Translation: Sculptors Making Prints and Drawings
- (April 9 – July 11, 2010) Currents 104: Bruce Yonemoto
- (March 12 – June 20, 2010) Lee Friedlander
- (February 5 – April 4, 2010) New Media Series | Marc Swanson & Neil Gust, Dark Room
- (February 14 – May 9, 2010) African Ceremonial Cloths: Selections from the Collection

== Services ==
- The Richardson Memorial Library, a public research library founded in 1915, retains resources that document the Museum's history, enrich its identity, and inform its collections and programs.
- Free guided tours for groups led by trained docents.

== See also ==
- List of largest art museums

== More information ==
- Saint Louis Art Museum 2004, Saint Louis Art Museum Handbook of the Collection, Saint Louis Art Museum, Saint Louis, Mo.
- Saint Louis Art Museum 1987, Saint Louis Art Museum, An Architectural History, Fall Bulletin, Saint Louis Art Museum, Saint Louis, MO.
- Stevens, Walter B. (ed.) 1915, Halsey Cooley Ives, LL.D. 1847–1911; Founder of the St. Louis School of Fine Arts; First Director of the City Art Museum of St. Louis, Ives Memorial Society, Saint Louis, MO
- Visitor Guide (brochure), Saint Louis Museum of Art, 2005.
- Washington University in St. Louis, Student Life, 2006, Buried Treasure:University Owned Mummy Kept at Saint Louis Museum.
