= Ian Monroe =

- Born: 1972 (age 52–53); Cooperstown, New York, U.S.
- Education: Washington University in St. Louis (BFA); Goldsmiths, University of London (MA)
- Occupation: Artist
- Website: www.ianmonroe.net

Ian Monroe (born 1972) is an artist based in London.

Monroe was born in Cooperstown, New York and spent his childhood in Reston, Virginia, a planned community 25 miles outside of Washington, D.C. Monroe received his BFA (Bachelor of Fine Arts) from Washington University in St. Louis in 1995. He went on to complete an MA (again in visual art) from Goldsmiths College, London, in 2002. The main work he exhibited at his MA show, Canyon Recreated, was bought by Charles Saatchi. Monroe came to public attention in 2003 when this piece was featured in the opening exhibition at the new Saatchi Gallery. Since then, Monroe's work has been acquired by a number of international museums and private collections.

Monroe makes large-scale images of illusionistic spaces via the medium of collage as well as sculpture using text to form structures. Monroe's work is primarily concerned with investigating both the visual and conceptual possibilities of the technological landscape.
