= Christ and the Woman Taken in Adultery (disambiguation) =

Jesus and the woman taken in adultery is an episode from the New Testament.

The titles for certain artistic works based on this episode, such as Christ and the Woman Taken in Adultery, may refer to:

- Christ and the Adulteress (Titian, Glasgow), a c. 1510 painting by Titian
- Christ and the Adulteress (Titian, Vienna), a c. 1520 painting by Titian
- Christ and the Woman Taken in Adultery, a fresco by Agostino Carracci, one of the Palazzo Sampieri frescoes
- Christ and the Woman Taken in Adultery (Beckmann), a 1917 painting by Max Beckmann
- Christ and the Woman Taken in Adultery (Bruegel), a 1565 painting by Pieter Bruegel the Elder
- Christ and the Woman Taken in Adultery (Polenov), a 1888 painting by Vasily Polenov
- Christ and the Woman Taken in Adultery (Preti), a 1650 painting by Mattia Preti
- Christ and the Woman Taken in Adultery (Rubens), a c. 1614 painting by Peter Paul Rubens
- The Woman Taken in Adultery, a 1590s painting by Paolo Veronese, part of the Duke of Buckingham series
- The Woman Taken in Adultery, a 1987 play by Wilfred Watson
- The Woman Taken in Adultery (Rembrandt), a 1644 painting by Rembrandt
