= Christ and the Canaanite Woman =

Christ and the Canaanite Woman may refer to paintings of the exorcism of the Syrophoenician woman's daughter:

- Christ and the Canaanite Woman (Carracci), a 1594-1595 painting by Annibale Carracci
- Christ and the Canaanite Woman (Preti), a c.1650 painting by Mattia Preti
- Christ and the Canaanite Woman (Drouais), a 1784 painting by Jean Germain Drouais
