= Portrait of a Woman Known as "Violante" =

Painting by Giovanni Cariani

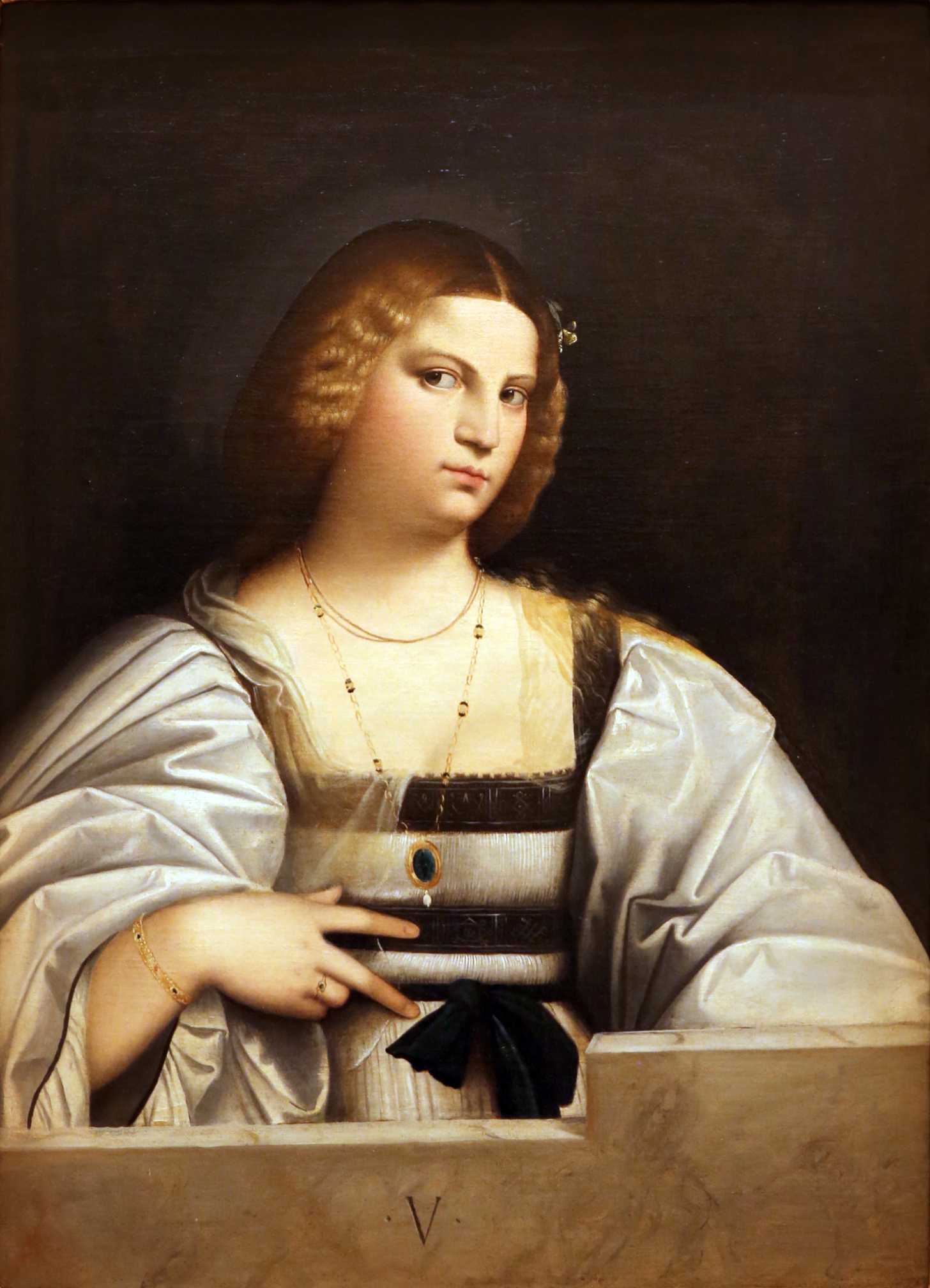
Modena version (RCGE 409), 89.5 x 65 cm (35.2 x 26 in)

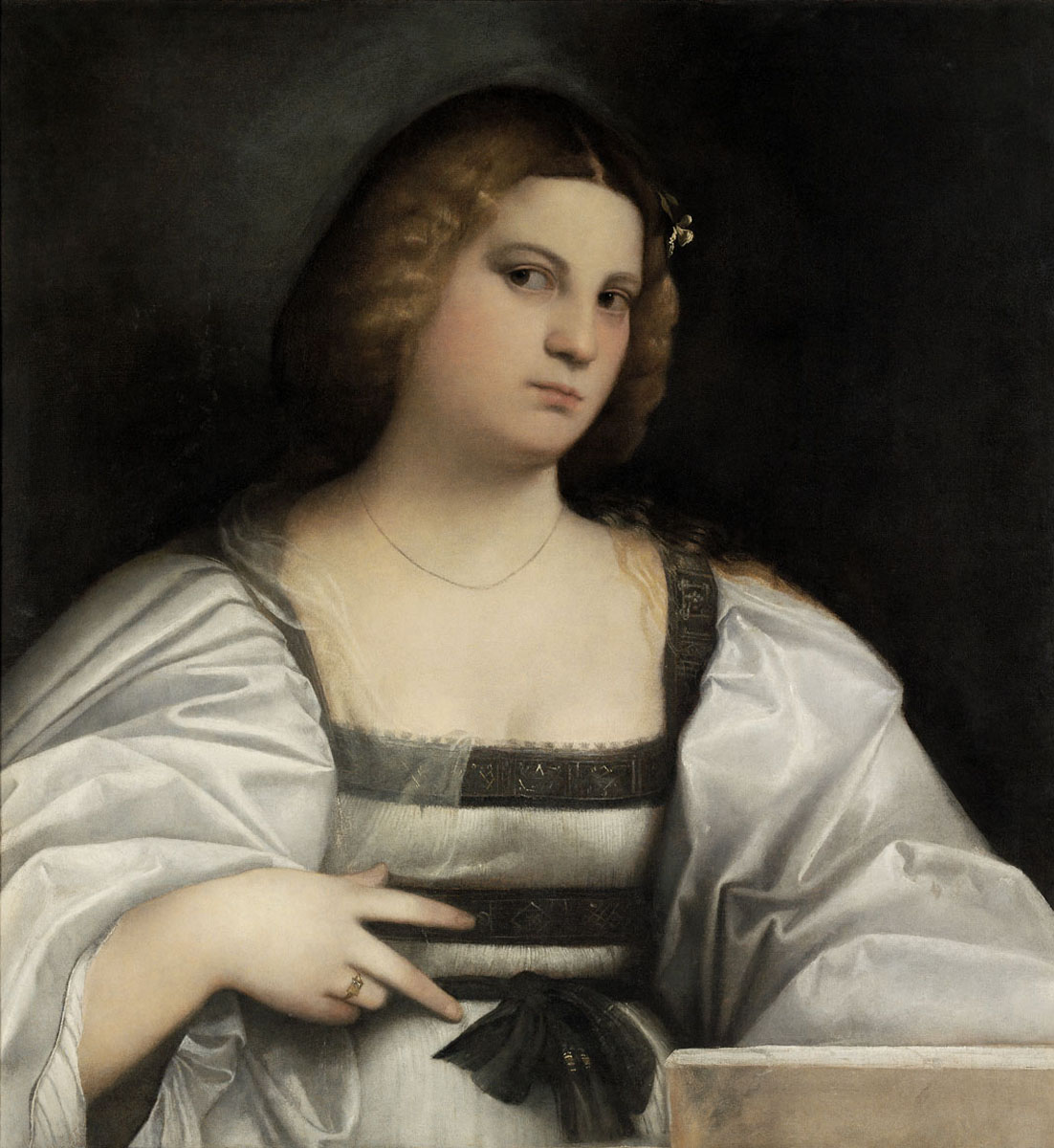
Budapest version (accession no. 84), 65 x 65 cm (25.5 x 25.5 in)

Portrait of a Woman Known as "Violante" (Italian: Ritratto di Donna Detta "Violante") is an oil painting, usually attributed to the Venetian painter Giovanni Cariani, and dated to the beginning of the 16th century, which is kept in the Galleria Estense in Modena.

There is a second version or copy, Portrait of a Young Woman (Hungarian: Fiatal nő képmása), also attributed to Cariani, and dated to around 1515, in the collection of the Szépművészeti Múzeum in Budapest.

== History ==
In 1663 the Modena version of the painting was displayed in the Doge's Palace in Venice alongside similar female portraits by Titian and Annibale Carracci. The finery worn by the subject indicates she is a gentlewoman. The gesture of her right hand towards her belt or girdle has been interpreted as a symbol of virginity.

== Gallery ==
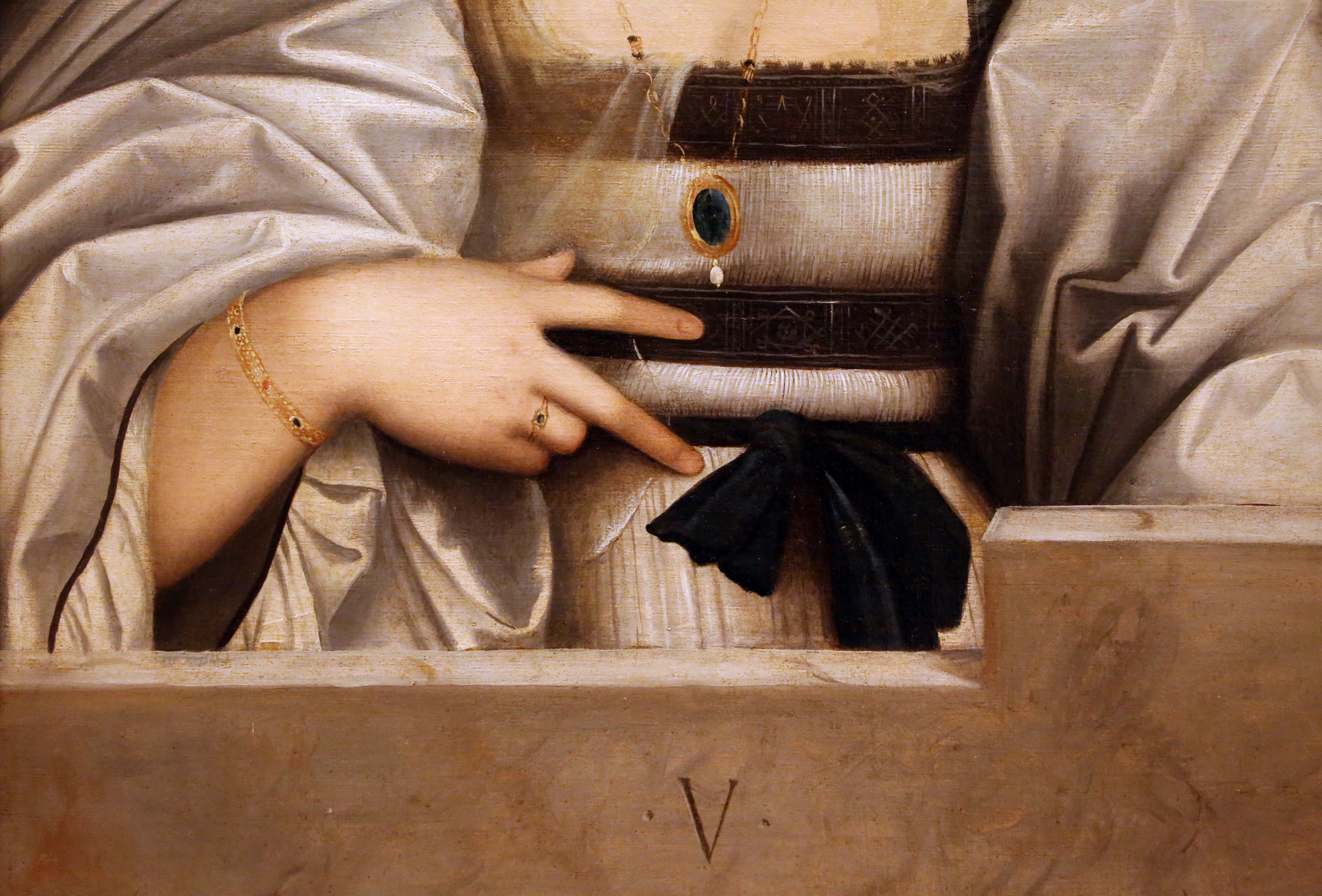
Detail of the right hand and bosom (Modena)

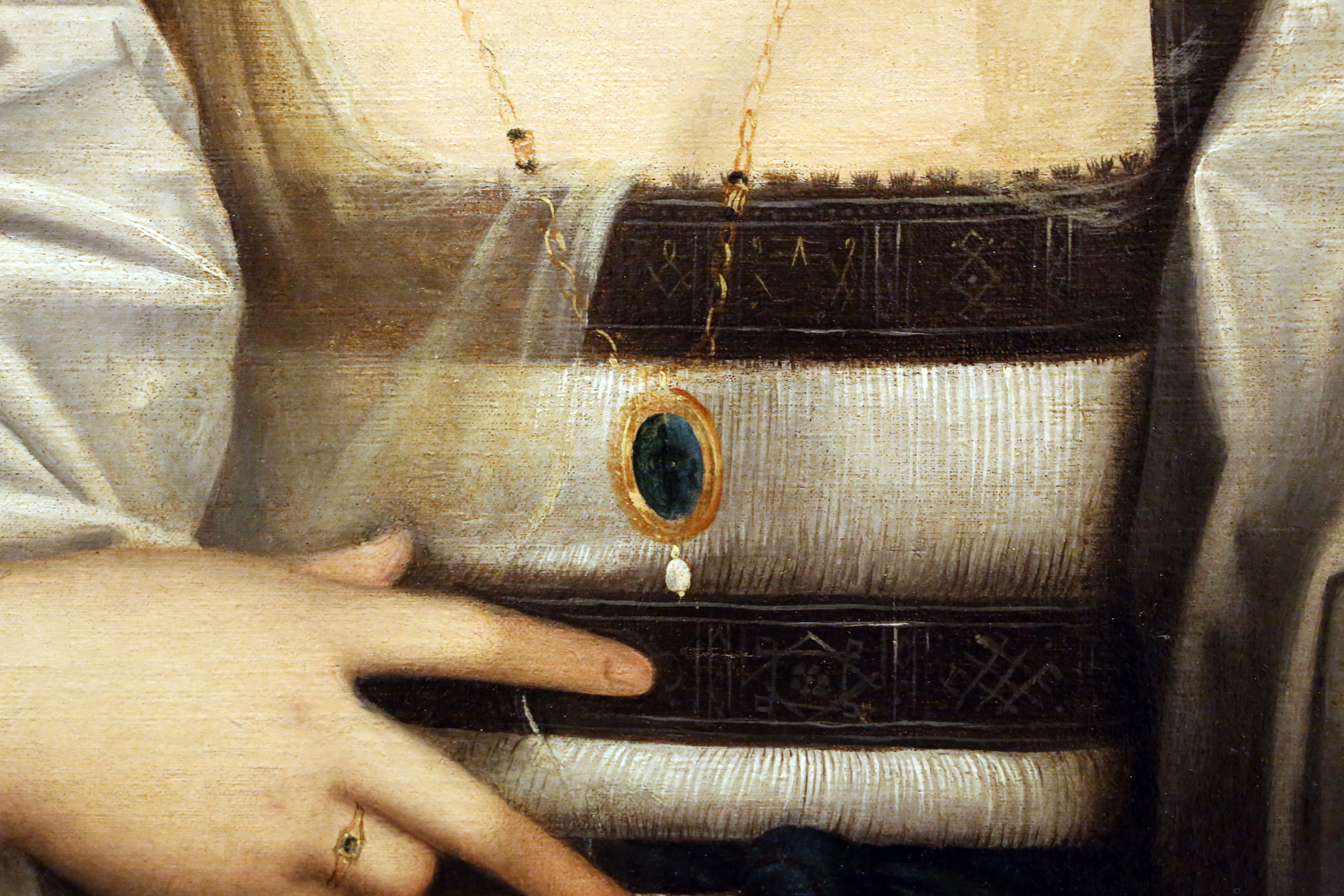
Closer detail (Modena)

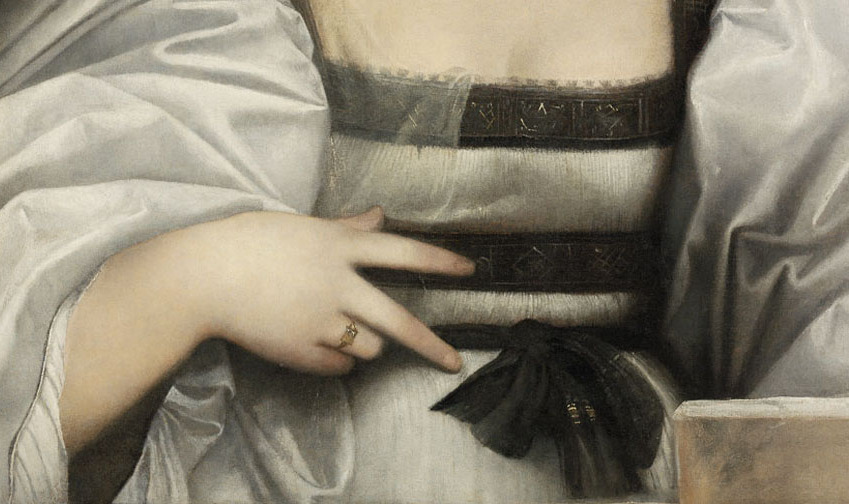
Detail of the right hand and bosom (Budapest)

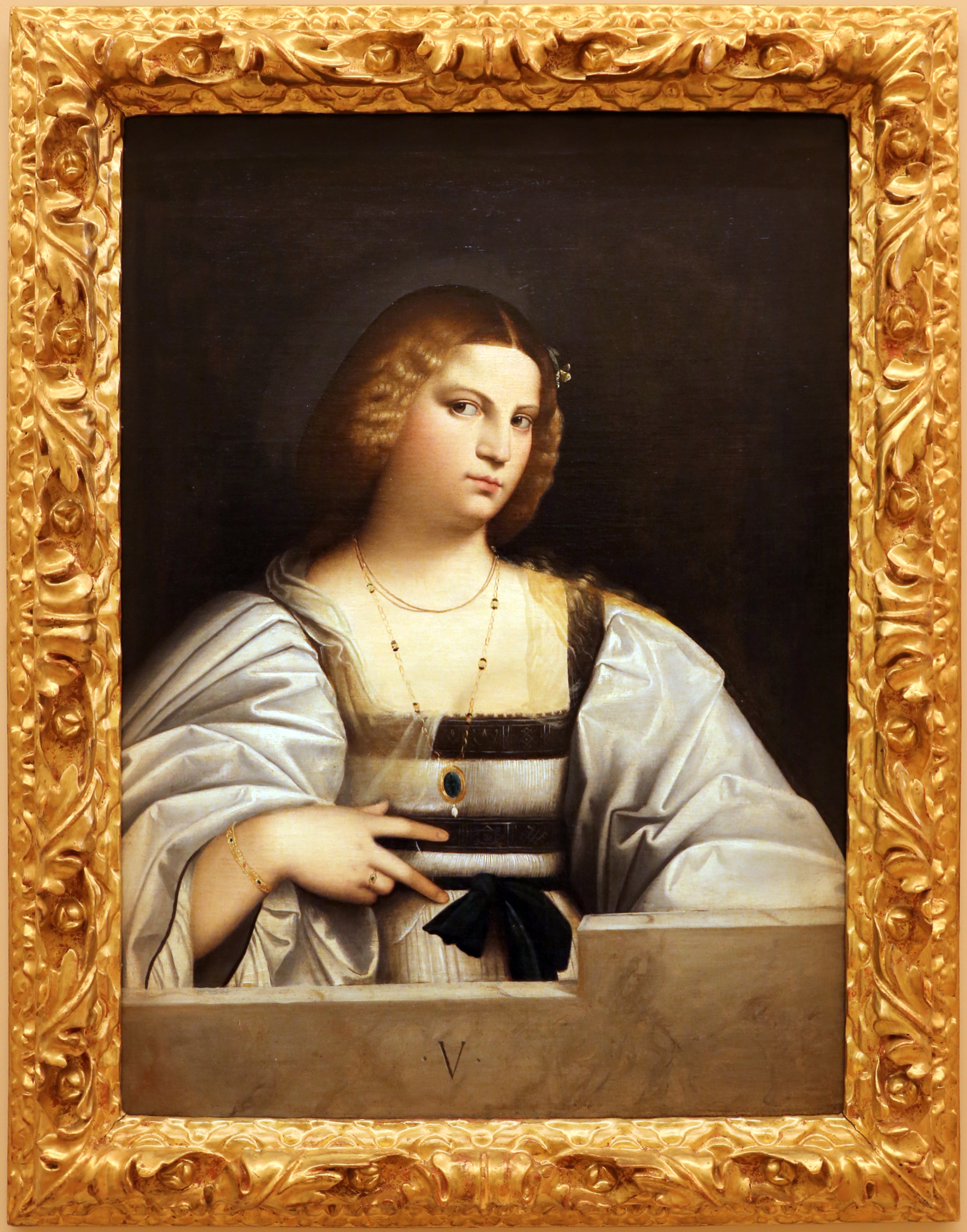
The Modena version in its frame

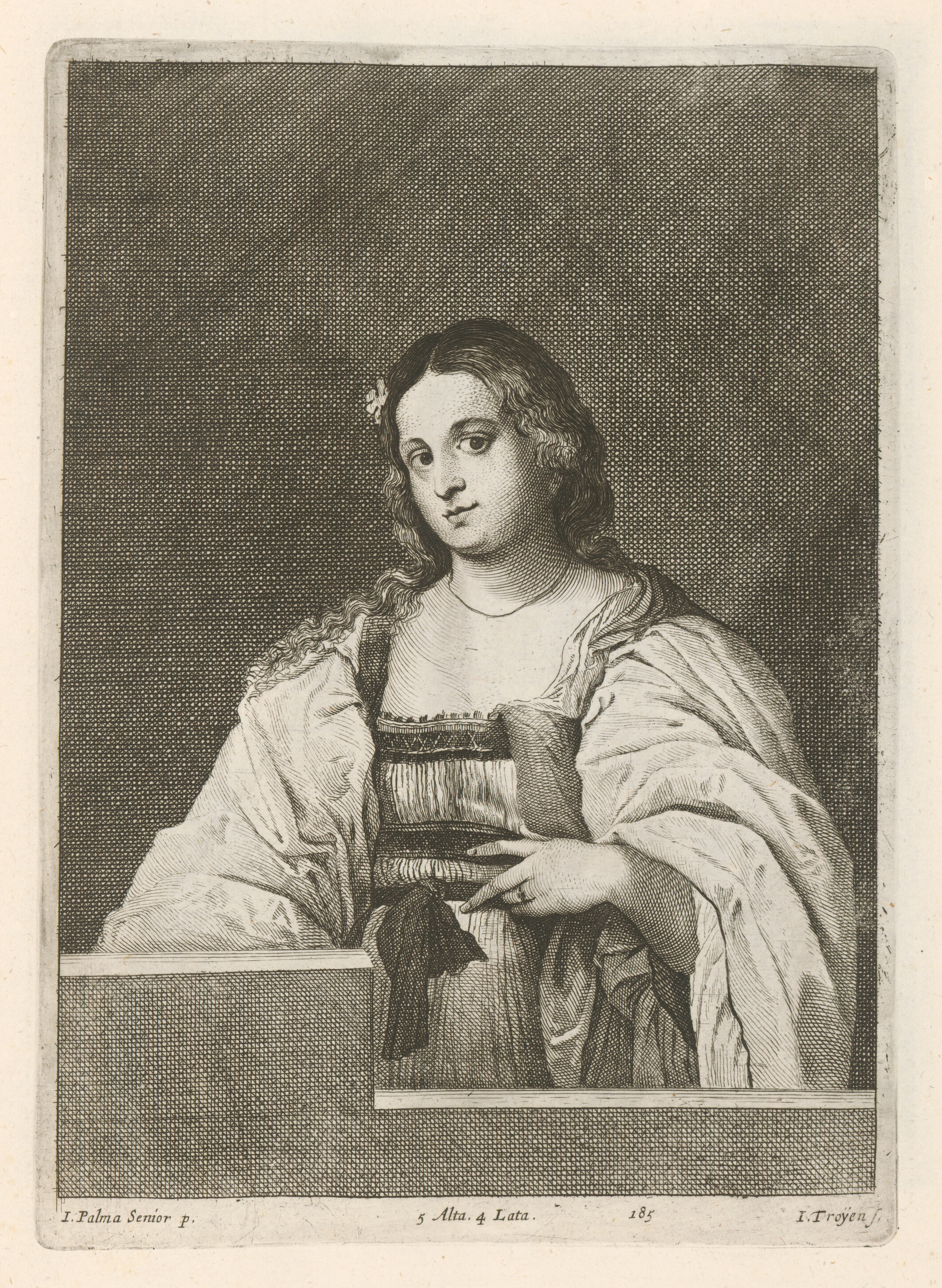
Jan van Troyen's engraving, Theatrum Pictorium, 1673

== Sources ==
- "Portrait of a Woman Known as "Violante"". Gallerie Estensi. Retrieved 27 November 2022.
- "Portrait of a Young Woman ("Violante")". Museum of Fine Arts, Budapest. Retrieved 27 November 2022.
