= Portrait of the Physician Gian Giacomo Bartolotti da Parma =

Painting by Titian

The Physician Gian Giacomo Bartolotti da Parma
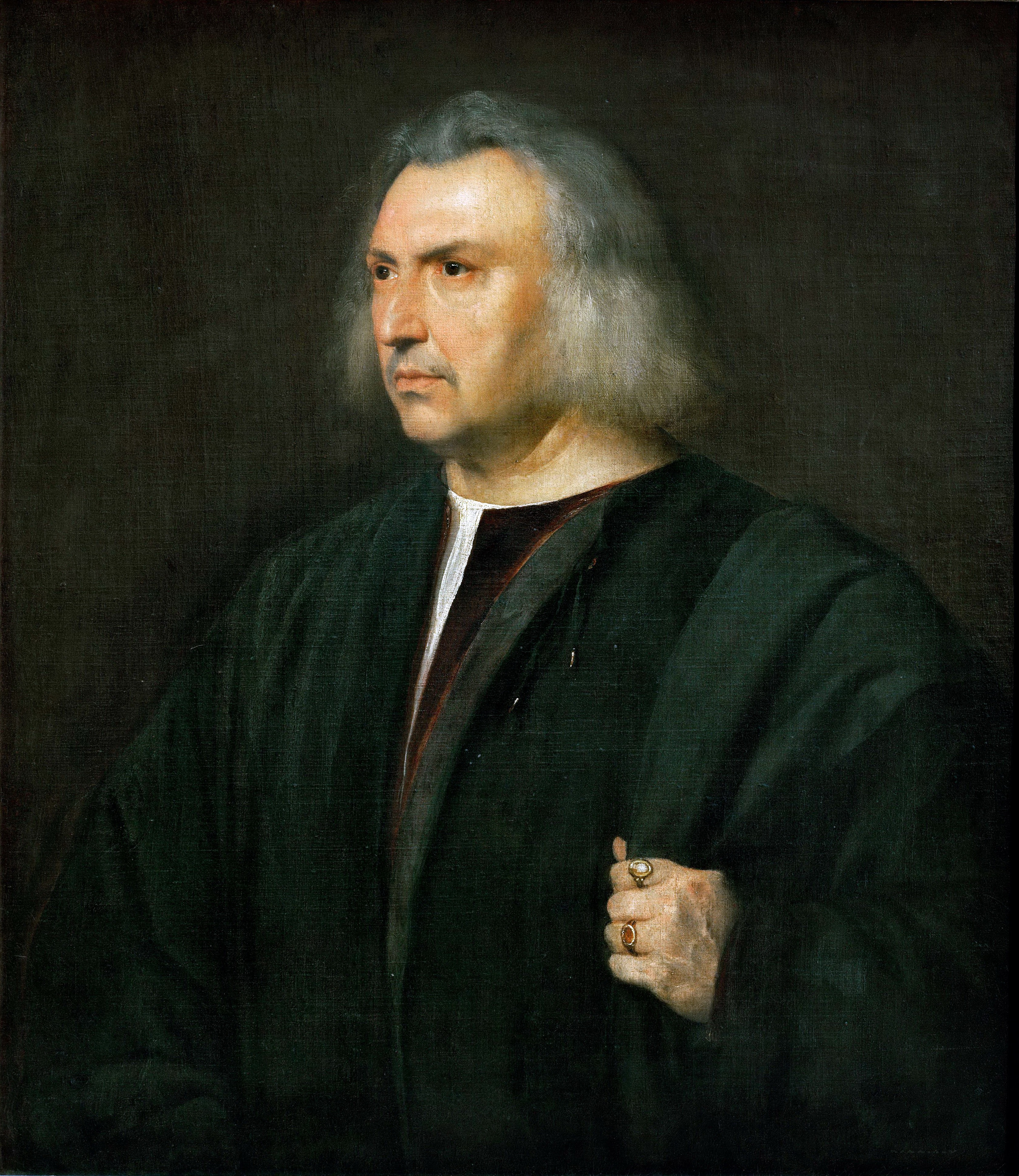
- Artist: Titian
- Year: c. 1515–1518
- Medium: Oil on canvas
- Dimensions: 88 cm × 75 cm (35 in × 30 in)
- Location: Kunsthistorisches Museum; Vienna
- Accession: GG_94

Portrait of the Physician Gian Giacomo Bartolotti da Parma (German: Der Arzt Gian Giacomo Bartolotti da Parma), also known as Portrait of a Man, is an oil painting by the Venetian master Titian, made c. 1515-1518. The painting is in the collection of the Kunsthistorisches Museum, in Vienna.

== Date ==
According to Georg Gronau, this picture must have been made about 1511, as there is in one of the Paduan frescoes a head remarkably similar in style. The Kunsthistorisches Museum dates it slightly later, to about 1515. Carlo Ridolfi saw it about 1648 in the house of Bartolomeo della Nave in Venice. The work is cited as a Titian in the Theatrum Pictorium of Archduke Leopold Wilhelm of Austria in 1660.

== Subject ==
The sitter is thought to be Gian Giacomo Bartolotti (fl. 1491–1530), a physician from Parma, who is said to have been Titian's doctor. This identification is made on the authority of Carlo Ridolfi, writing in 1648:

Altro ne fece del medico suo detto il Parma, di faccia rasa, con chioma canuta a mezza orecchia, …
"He did another [portrait] of his doctor, called "the Parma", shaved in the face, with white hair long down to the middle of the ears".

== Analysis ==
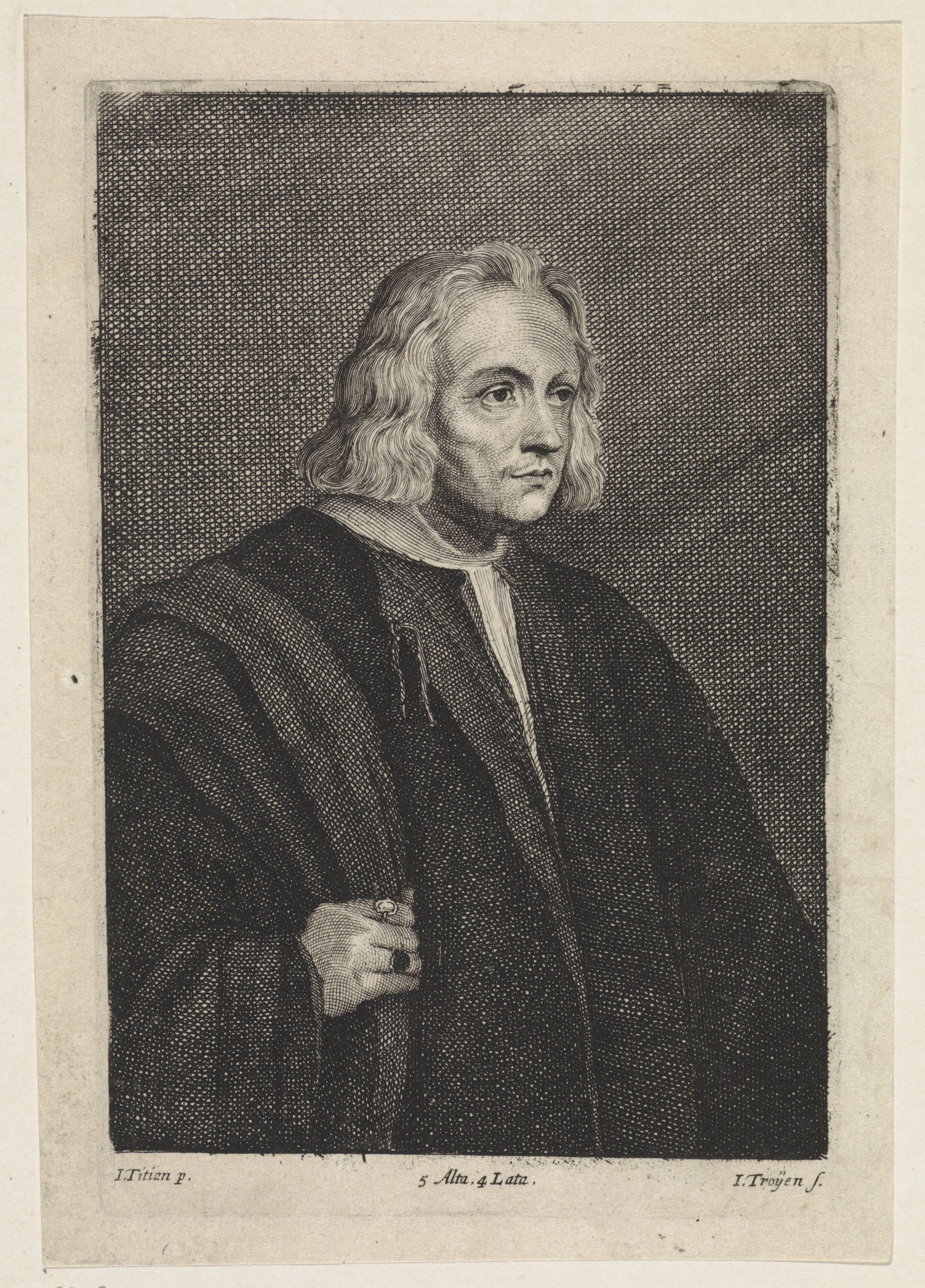
Engraving by Jan van Troyen after Titian in the Theatrum Pictorium (1660)

Gronau notes how a comparison of the few single portraits belonging to Titian's earlier years leads us to observe that in them the hands are made use of as an essential characteristic of the personality. Here the powerful left hand clasps a strip of black cloth hanging from his shoulder, "a habitual gesture, by which the great doctor could be recognised from afar", and "the eyes are fixed on some distant point with a concentrated look, no doubt a scarcely less important characteristic of the man".

== Provenance ==
- 1636—Probably in the collection of Bartolomeo della Nave, in Venice;
- 1638–1649—In the collection of James Hamilton, 1st Duke of Hamilton;
- 1660—In the collection of Archduke Leopold Wilhelm of Austria.

== See also ==
- List of works by Titian

== Sources ==
- Ricketts, Charles (1910). Titian. London: Methuen & Co. Ltd. pp. 46, 54, 59, 108, 175, plate XXXVII.
- Ridolfi, Carlo (1648). Le maraviglie dell'Arte ovvero, Le vite degli Illustri Pittori Veneti e dello Stato. Vol. 1. Venice: Giovanni Battista Sgava. pp. 151–152.
- "Der Arzt Gian Giacomo Bartolotti da Parma". Kunsthistorisches Museum. Accessed 21 August 2022.

Attribution:
