= Christ and the Adulteress (Titian, Vienna) =

Painting by Titian

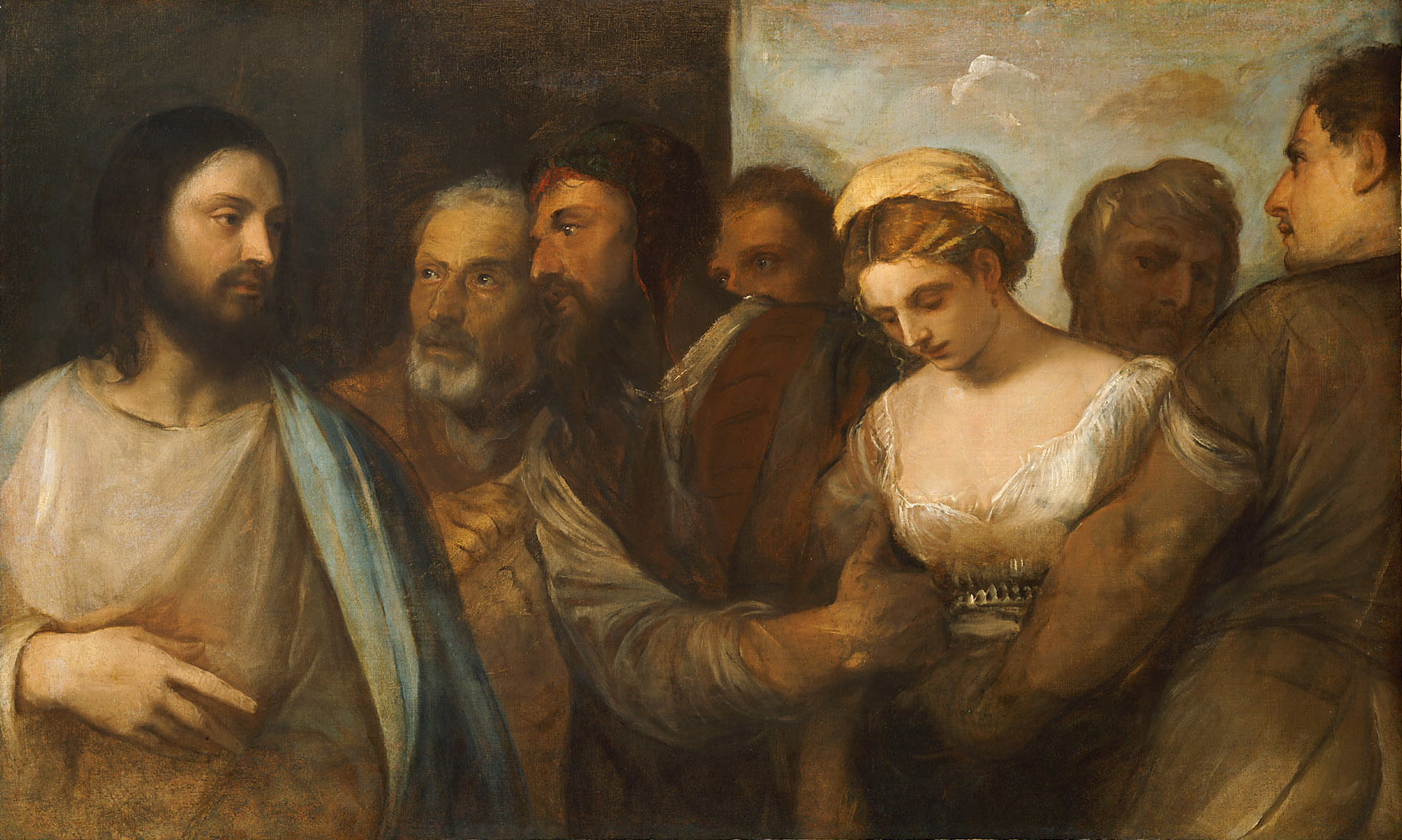
- Artist: Titian
- Year: c. 1520
- Medium: Oil on canvas
- Dimensions: 82.5 cm × 136.5 cm (32.5 in × 53.7 in)
- Location: Museum of Fine Arts; Vienna
- Accession: GG_114

Christ and the Adulteress (German: Christus und die Ehebrecherin), also titled Christ and the Woman Taken in Adultery, or The Adulteress before Christ, is an oil painting by Titian, made about 1520, in the Kunsthistorisches Museum, Vienna, depicting Jesus and the woman taken in adultery.

== Provenance ==
Carlo Ridolfi mentions having seen this picture in the Venetian studio of Bartolomeo della Nave. It formed part of the art collection of the Duke of Hamilton from 1638 to 1649. It then entered the collection Archduke Leopold Wilhelm of Austria.

== Copies ==
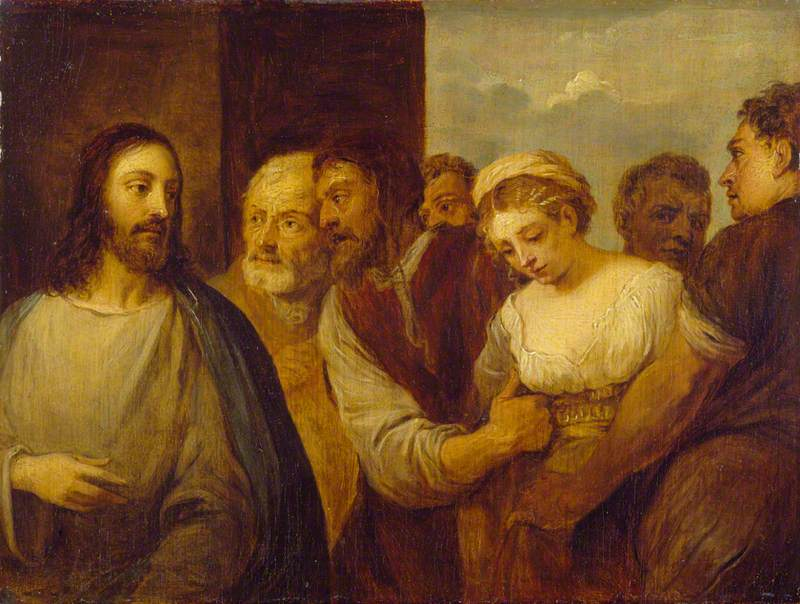
Copy by Teniers after Titian, c. 1655–1656 (16.9 x 22.5 cm)

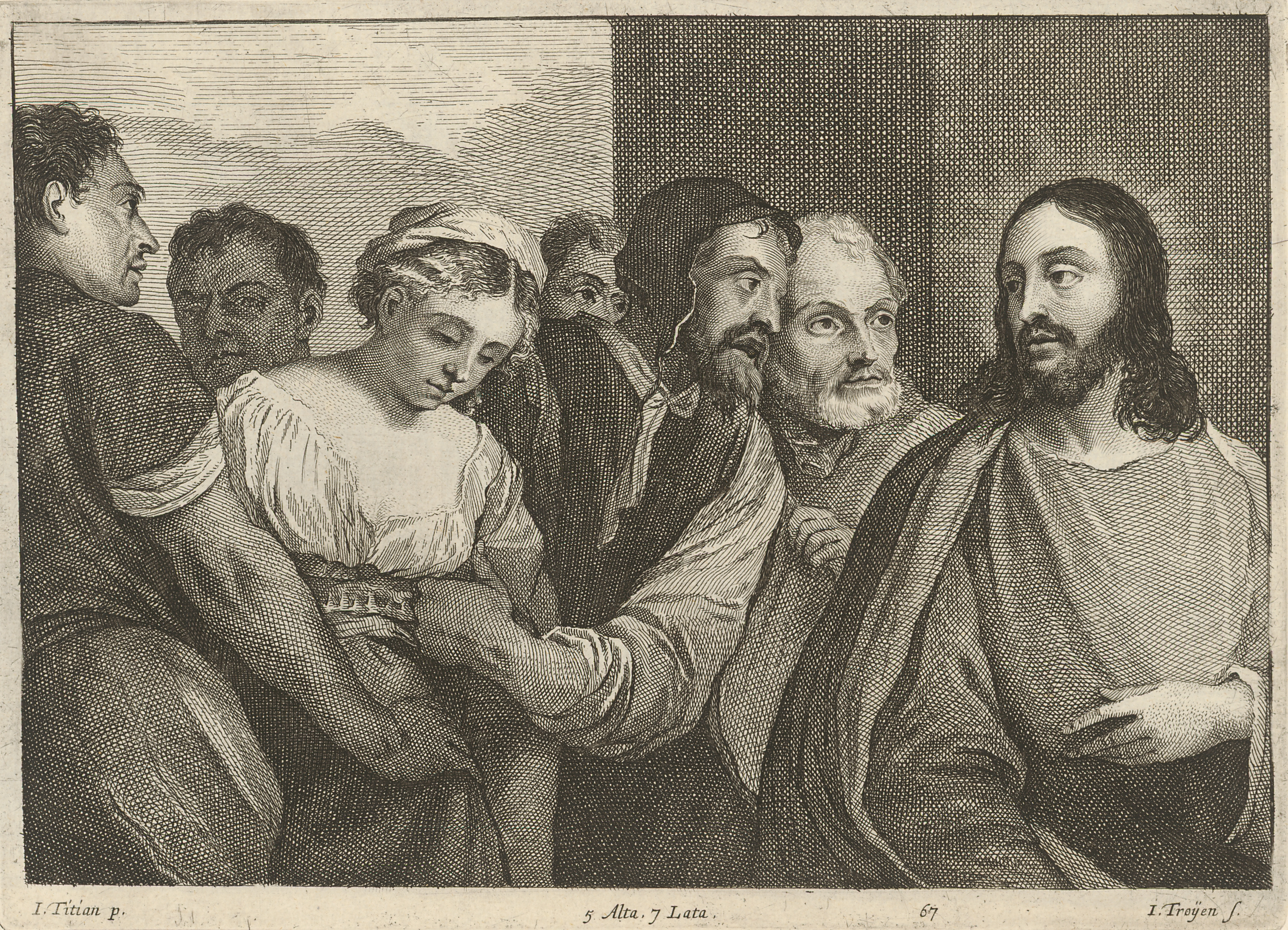
Print by Jan van Troyen after Teniers for the Theatrum Pictorium, 1673

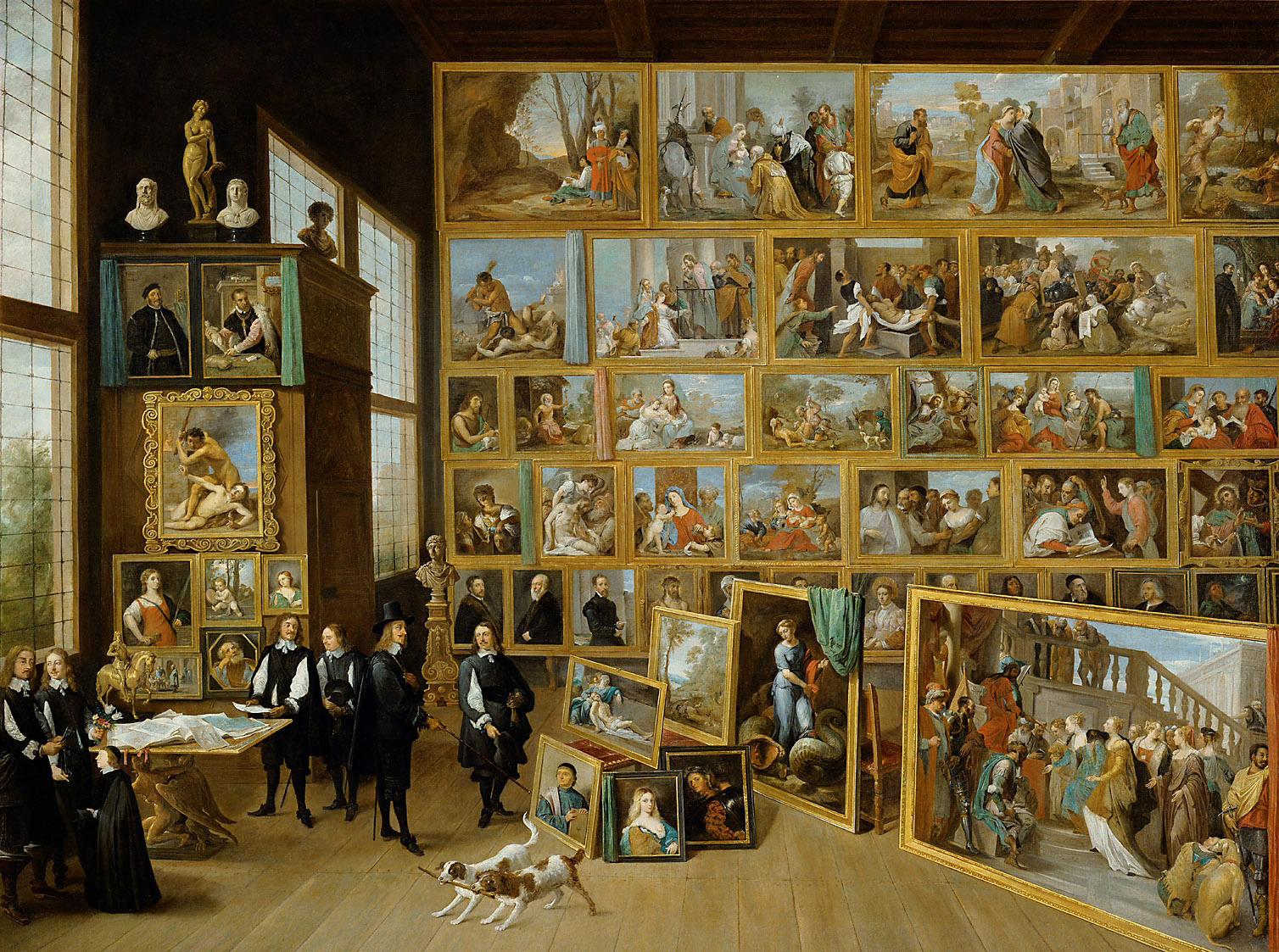
Gallery of Archduke Leopold Wilhelm in Brussels, (Vienna, c. 1650)

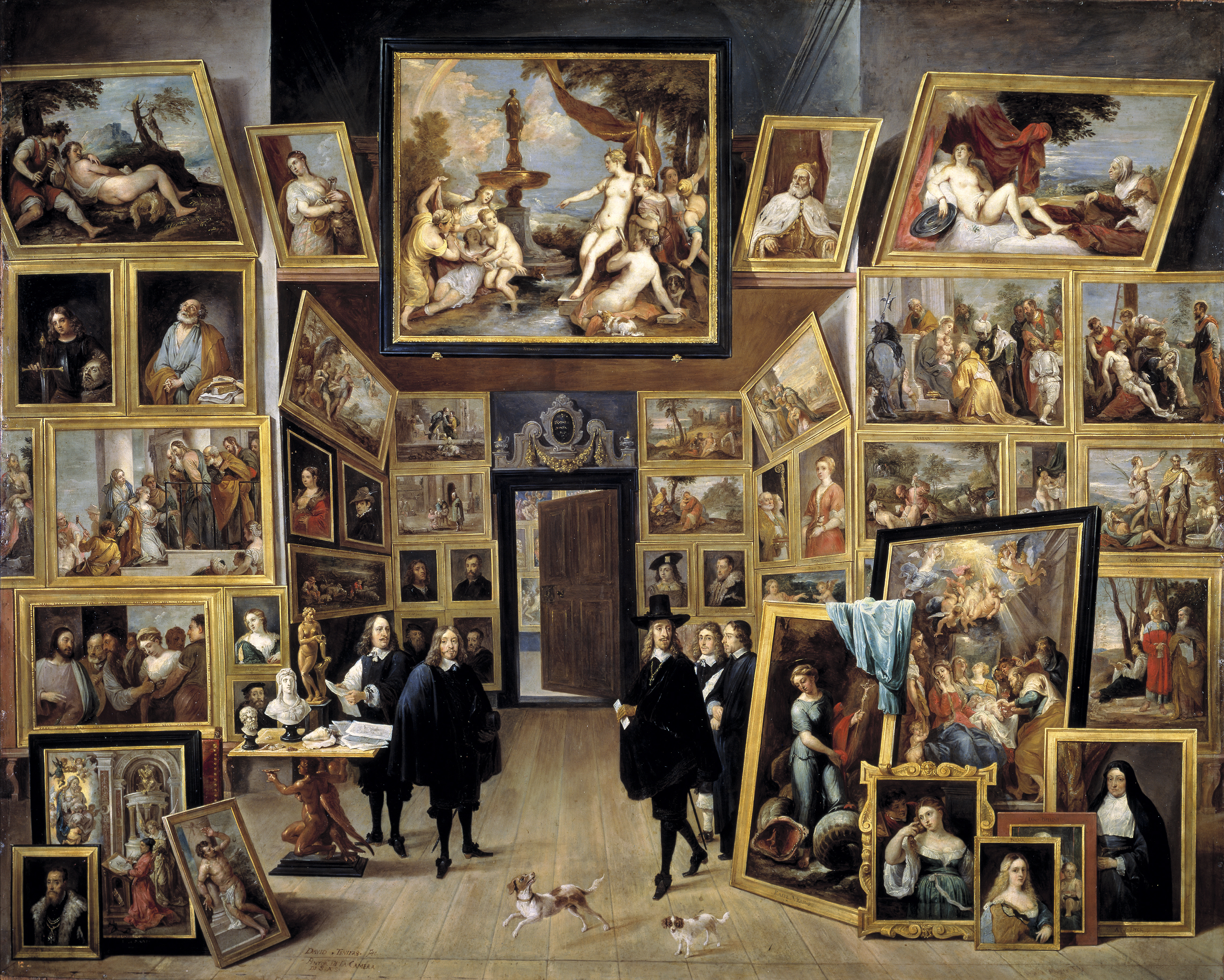
Archduke Leopold Wilhelm in his Painting Gallery in Brussels (Prado, 1651)

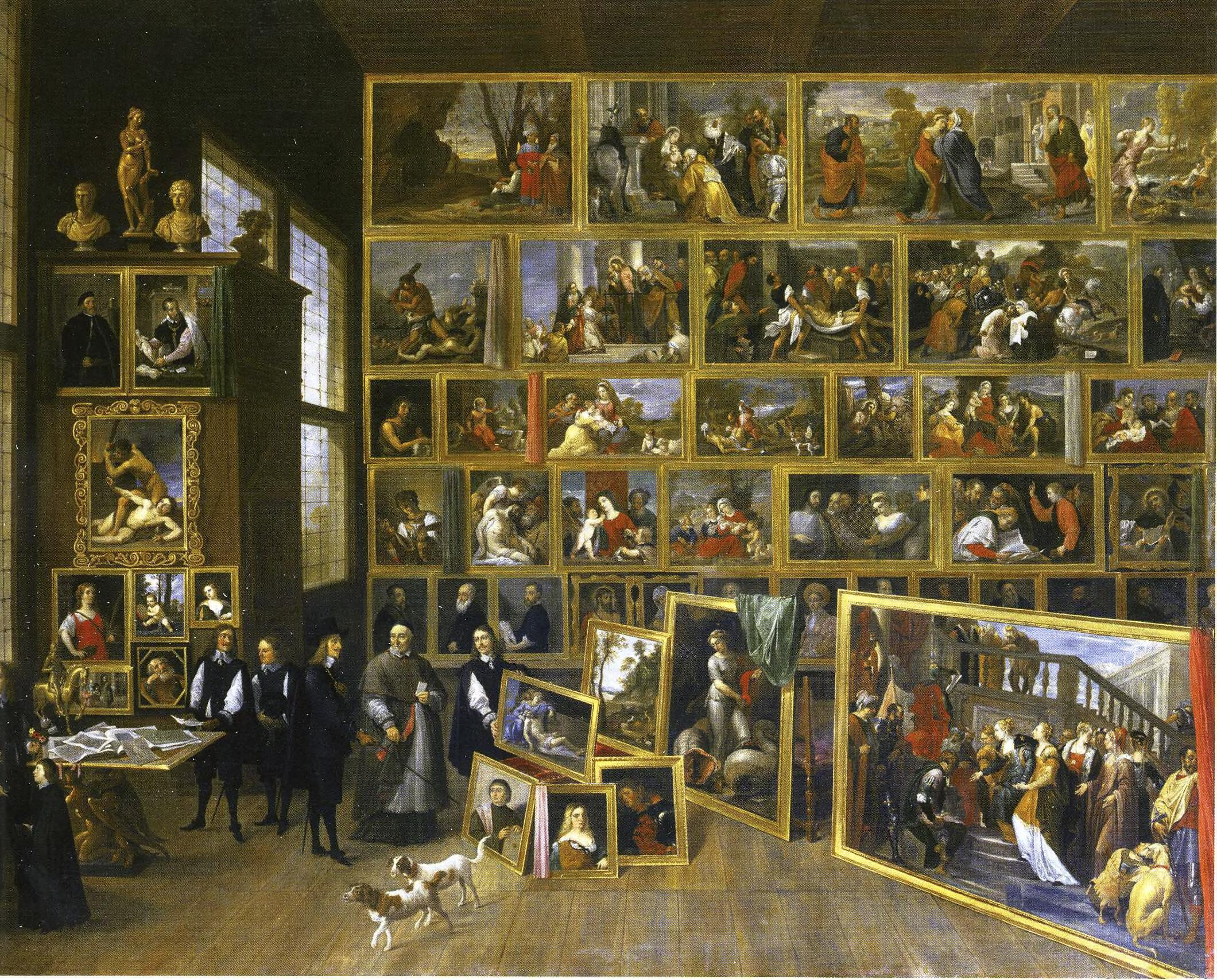
Gallery of Archduke Leopold Wilhelm in Brussels (Petworth, 1651)

== See also ==
- List of works by Titian

== Sources ==
- Ricketts, Charles (1910). Titian. London: Methuen & Co. Ltd. pp. 24, 35, 146, 176.
- "Christus und die Ehebrecherin". Kunsthistorisches Museum. Retrieved 27 October 2022.
