= Gian Giacomo Bartolotti =

Italian physician

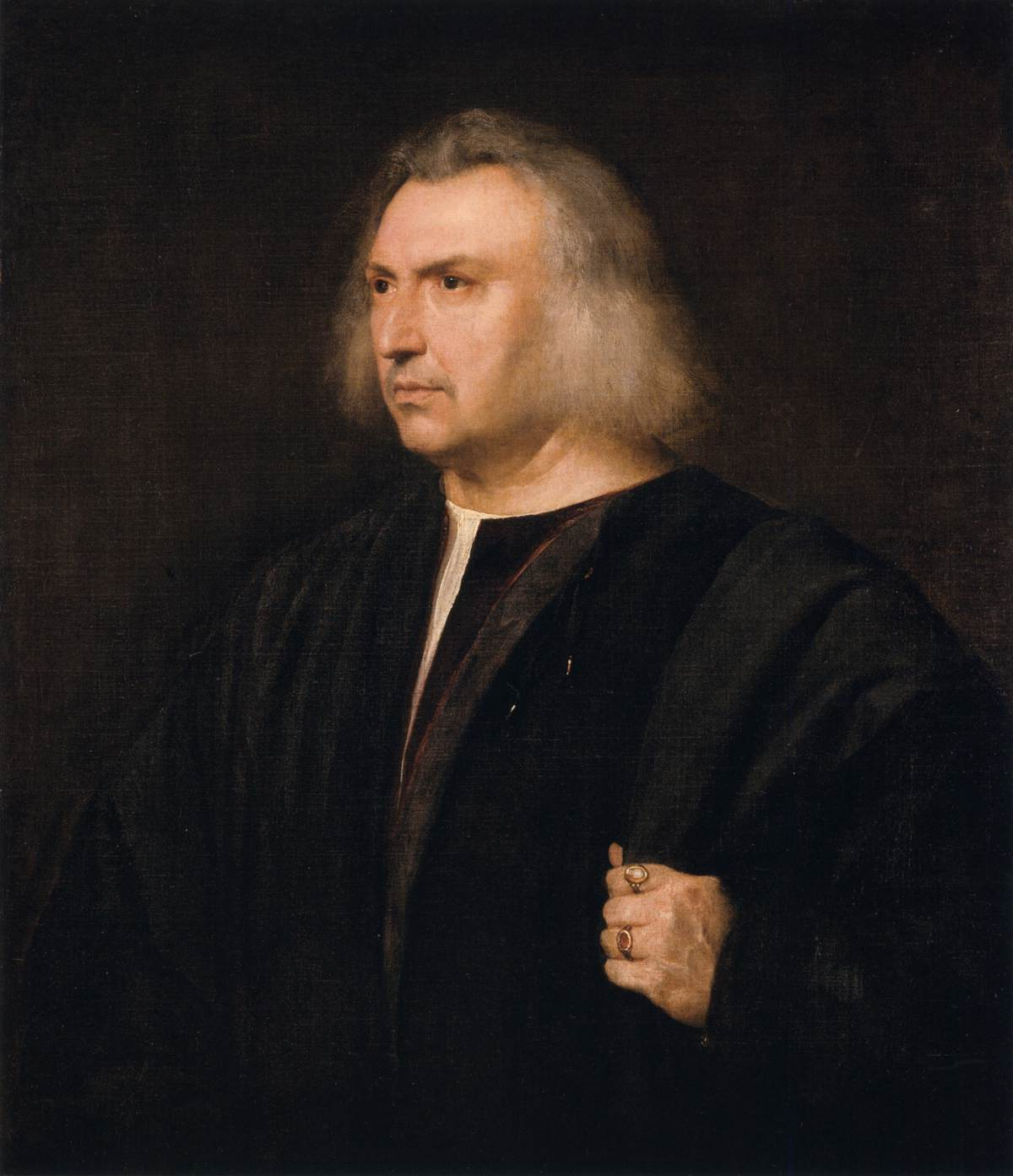
Portrait by Titian, c. 1515

Gian Giacomo Bartolotti (fl. 1491–1530) was an Italian physician from Parma who practiced in Venice. He was the son of the physician Pellegrino Bartolotti, and a nephew of Francesco Bartolotti. He published a history of medicine of the period, Opusculum de antiquitate medicinae.

== Life ==
Bartolotti studied at Bologna in 1491 and at Ferrara where his teachers included Antonio Cittadini and of Sebastiano Dell’Aquila. He may have served as a naval doctor on a Venetian fleet in the middle east. In 1511–12 he became prior at the Collegio de' medici fisici of Venice and lived at least until 1530. The date of death is unknown. He is believed to be the author of an anonymous piece of "Macaronic poetry" which mocks the older generation of surgeons including his father and uncle who believed that trephining was the only cure for skull fractures while he was a rationalist following Hippocratic tradition.

== Works ==
Bartolotti translated, in dialogue form, a treatise attributed to Cebes, a disciple of Socrates and wrote a treatise on ancient medicine Opusculum de antiquitate medicinae (or Dell' Antica Medicina).
