= Christ and the Woman Taken in Adultery (Preti) =

Painting by Mattia Preti

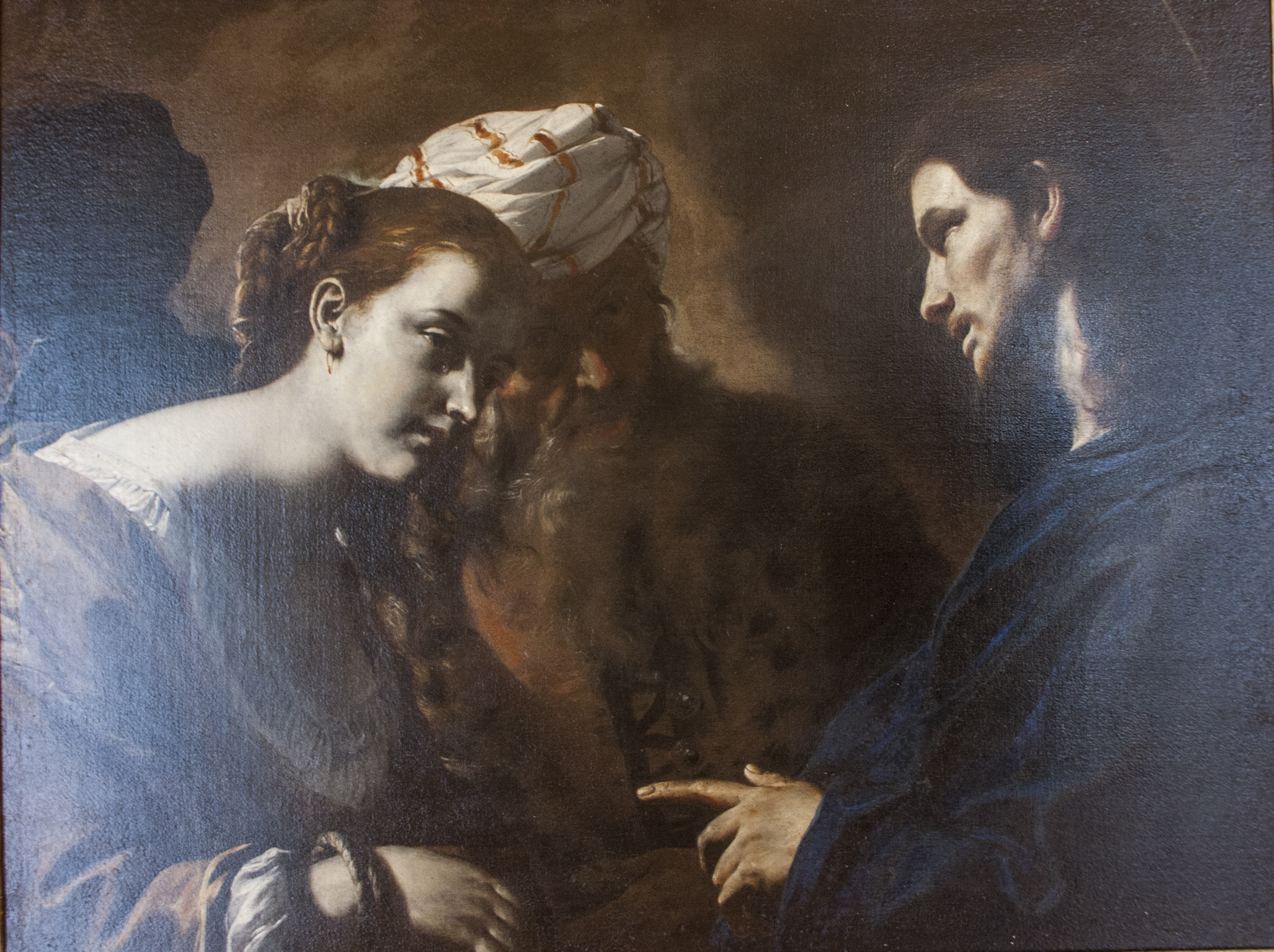
Christ and the Woman Taken in Adultery (c. 1650) by Mattia Preti

Christ and the Woman Taken in Adultery is a c. 1650 oil-on-canvas painting by the Italian Baroque artist Mattia Preti.

It and another work by Preti showing Christ with a single woman (Christ and the Canaanite Woman) were both recorded as being in the Certosa di San Martino in Naples in 1806, but were split up the following year when Adultery was acquired by the Real Museo Borbonico and Canaanite passed to the church of Sant'Efremo Nuovo. In 1828 the two works and 38 others were given to the Museo della Regia Università degli Studi in Palermo, Sicily by Francis I of the Two Sicilies and they both now hang in the Palazzo Abatellis in the same city.
