= Duke of Buckingham series =

Series of nine paintings by Paolo Veronese

The Duke of Buckingham series is a 1590s cycle of Old and New Testament paintings by Paolo Veronese and his workshop. They were acquired in Venice in 1595 by Charles III de Croÿ, then Duke of Aarschot, and moved to his castle at Beaumont. It was acquired early in the 17th century by George Villiers, 1st Duke of Buckingham, hence its title. Most of the series are in the Kunsthistorisches Museum in Vienna, though two are in the National Gallery in Prague and one in the National Gallery of Art in Washington.

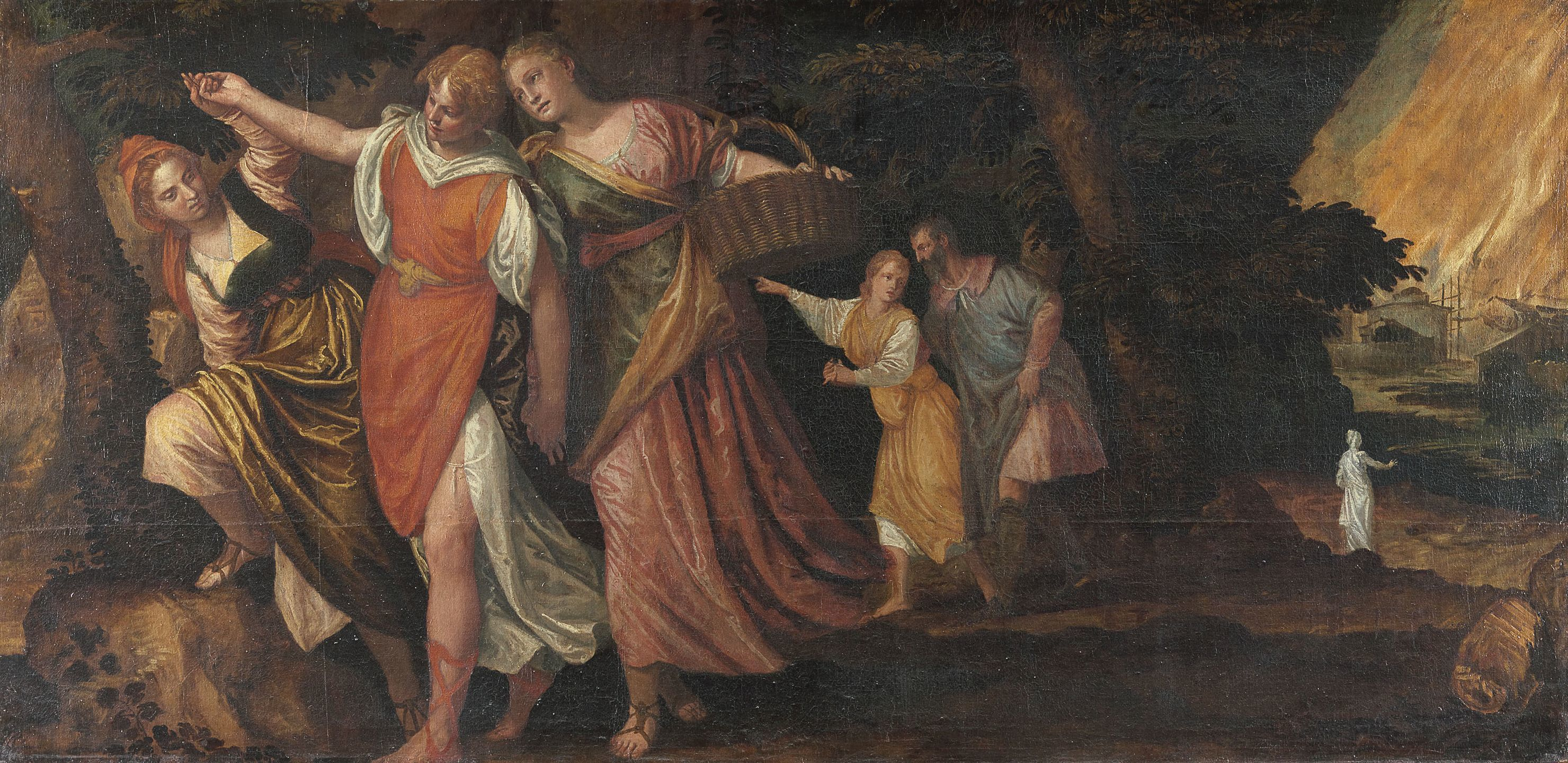
Lot and his Family Flee Sodom, Kunsthistorisches Museum, Vienna

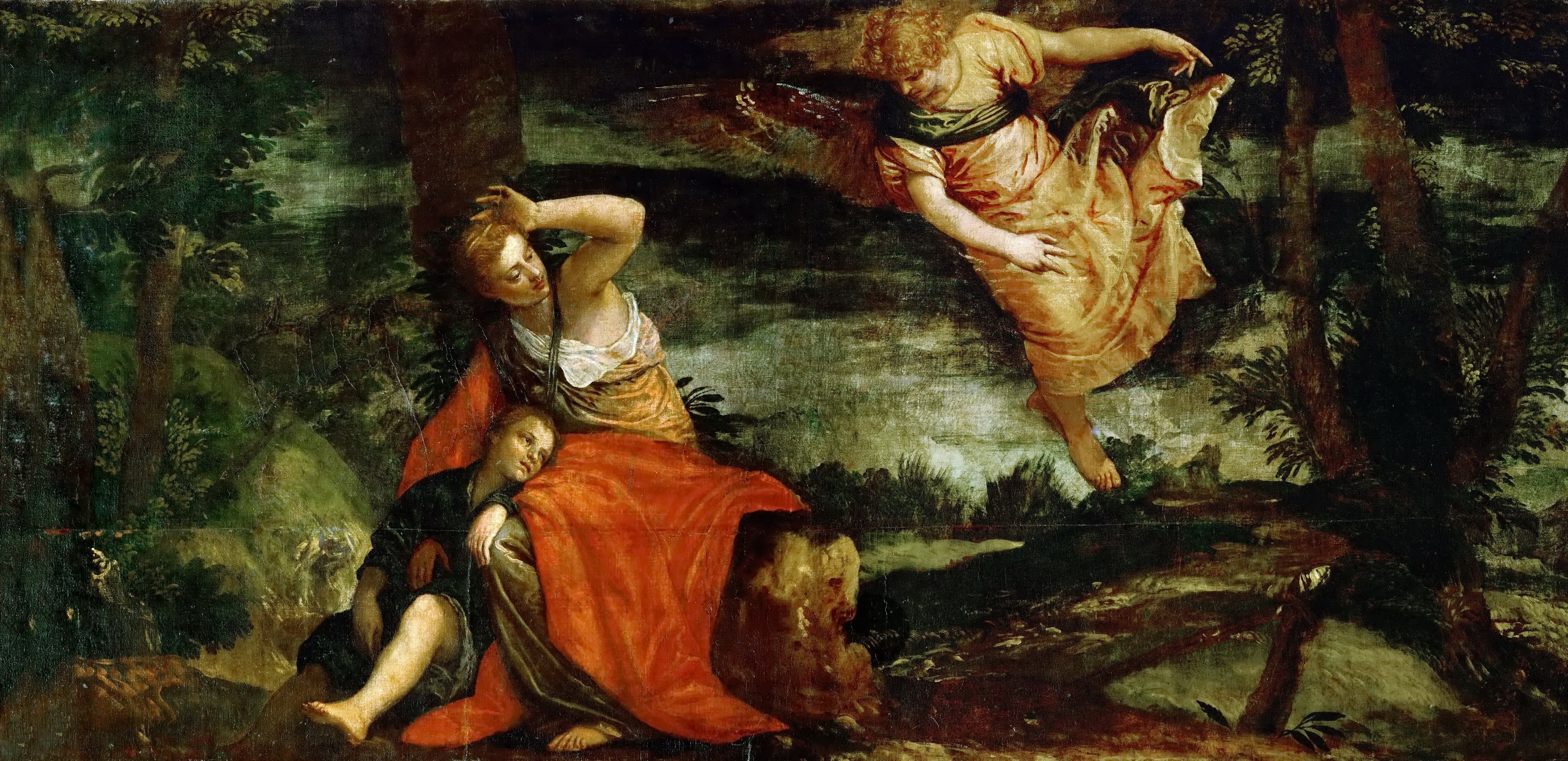
The Angel Appears to Hagar in the Desert, Kunsthistorisches Museum, Vienna

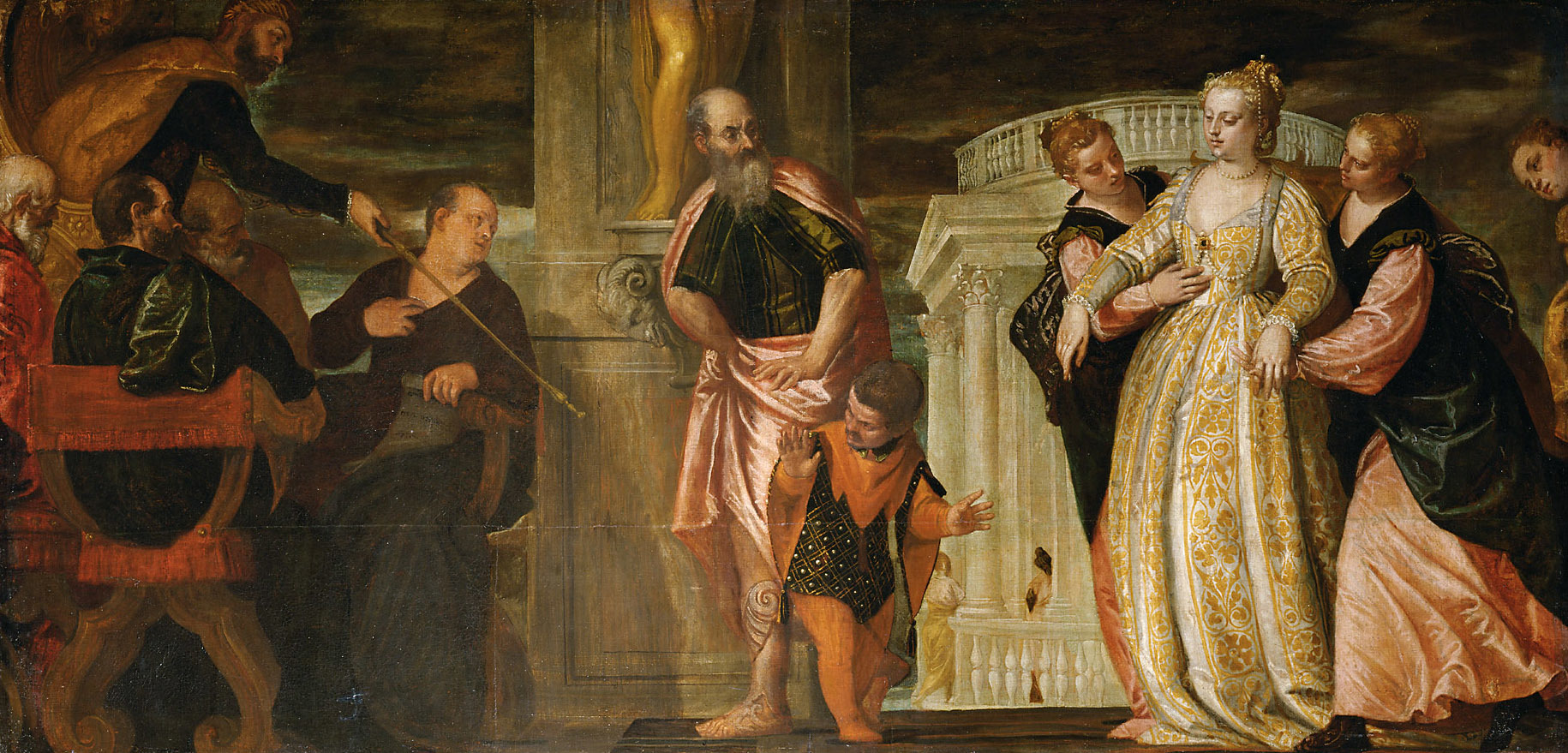
Esther and Ahasuerus, Kunsthistorisches Museum, Vienna

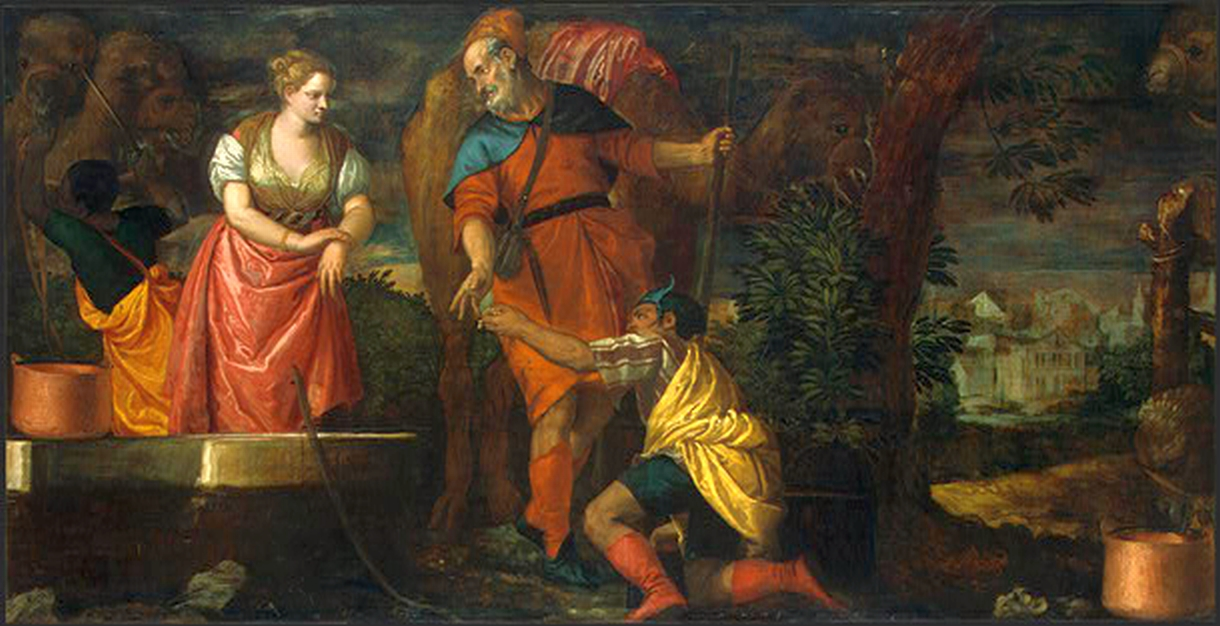
Rebecca at the Well, National Gallery of Art, Washington

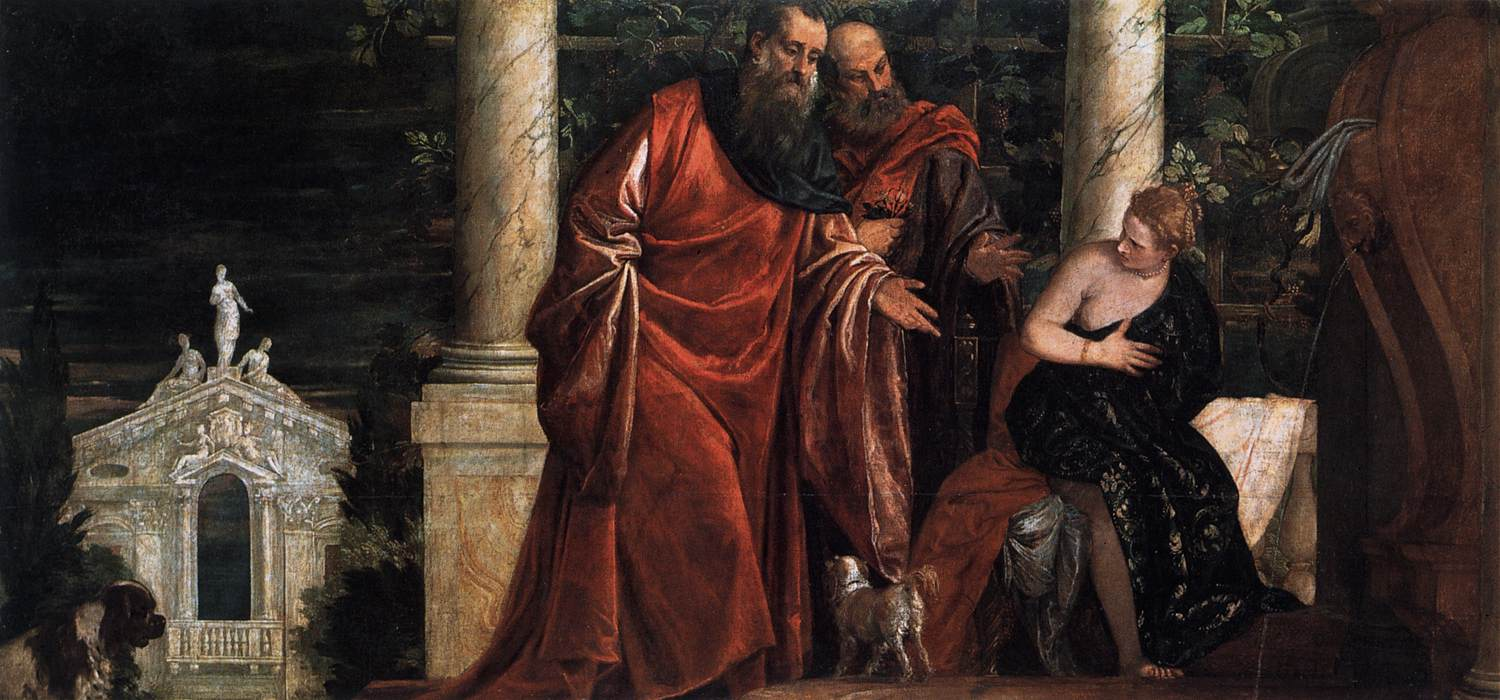
Susanna and the Elders, Kunsthistorisches Museum, Vienna

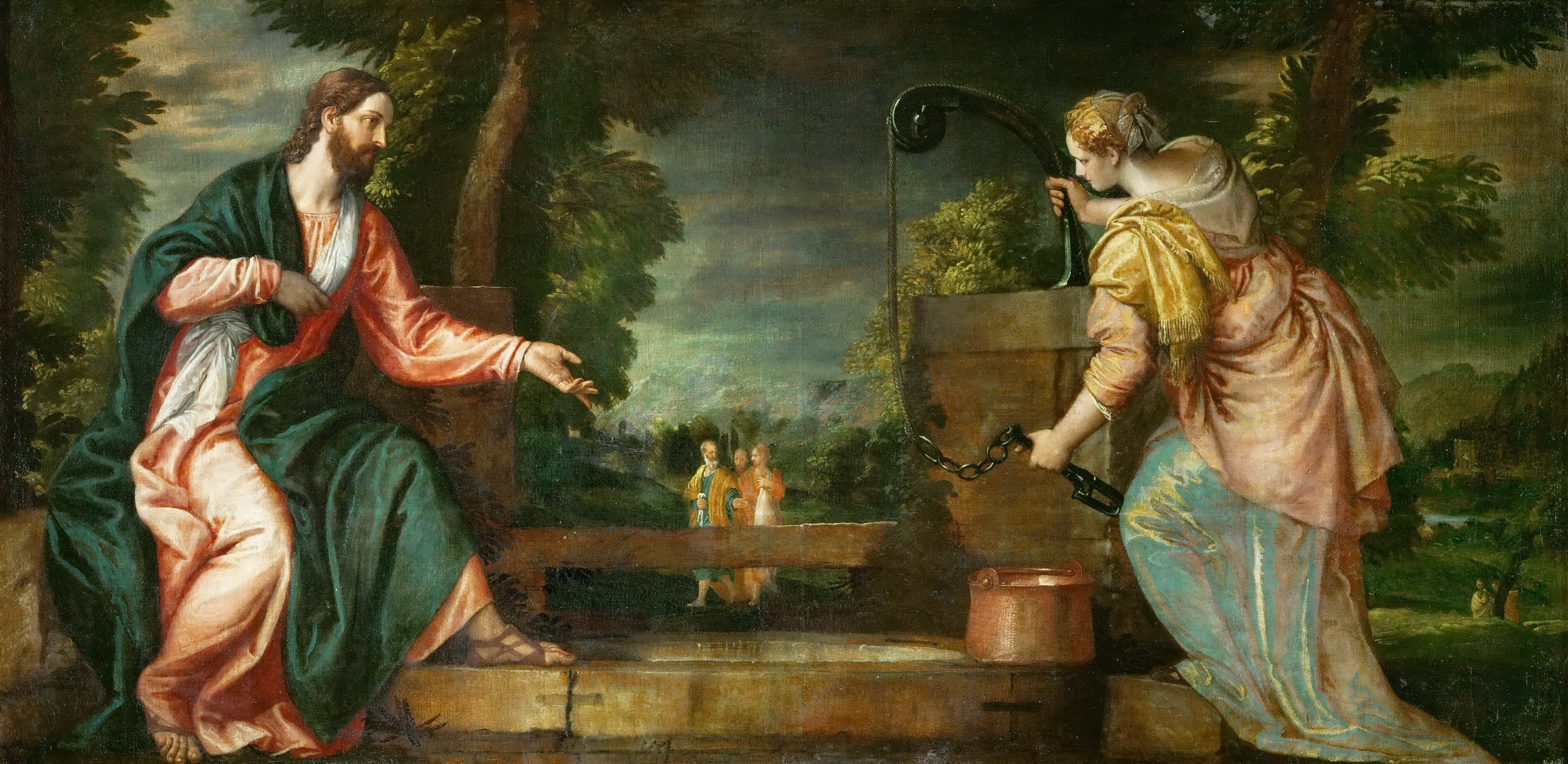
The Samaritan Woman, Kunsthistorisches Museum, Vienna

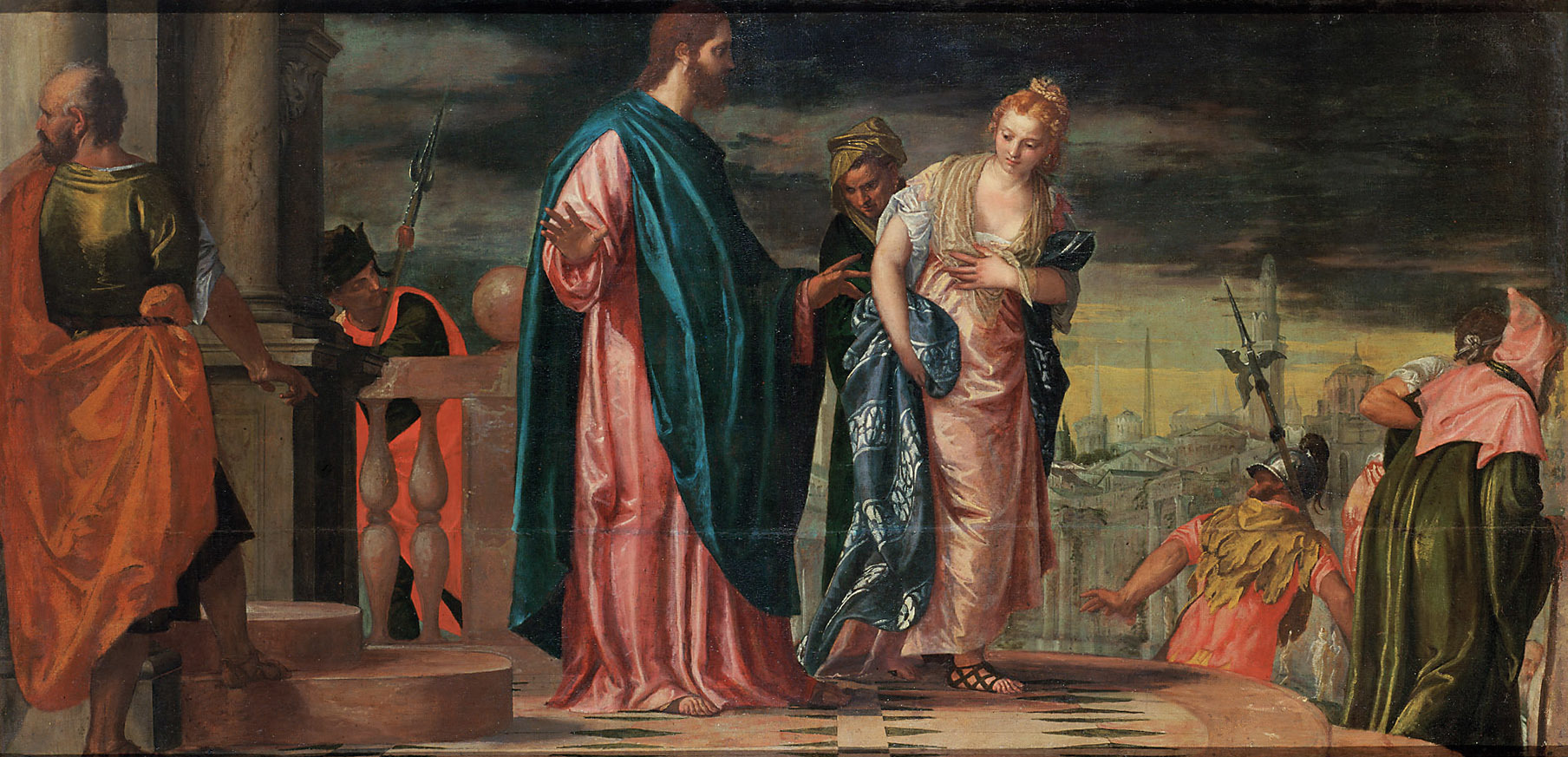
The Woman Taken in Adultery, Kunsthistorisches Museum, Vienna

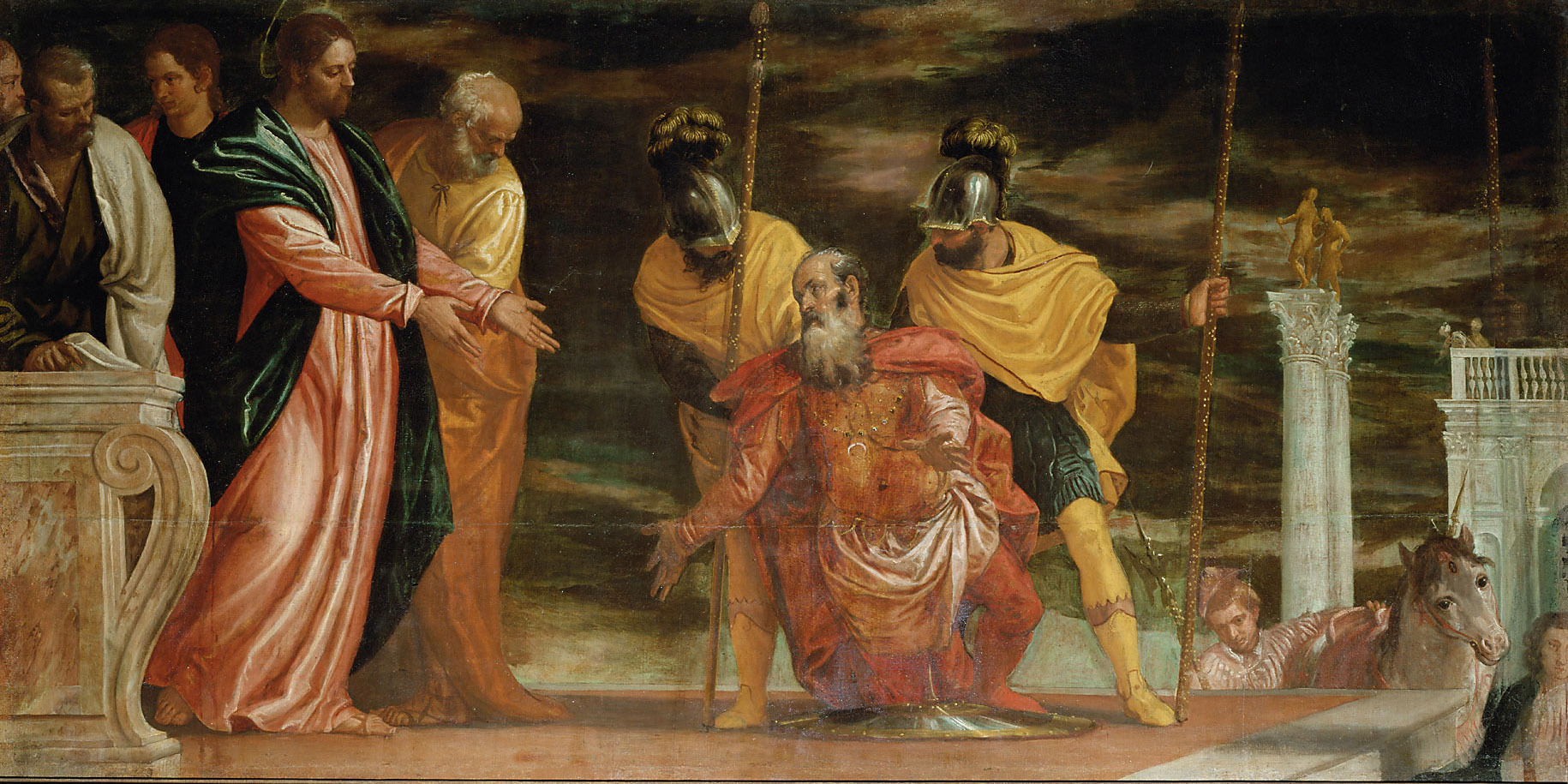
Christ and the Centurion, Kunsthistorisches Museum, Vienna

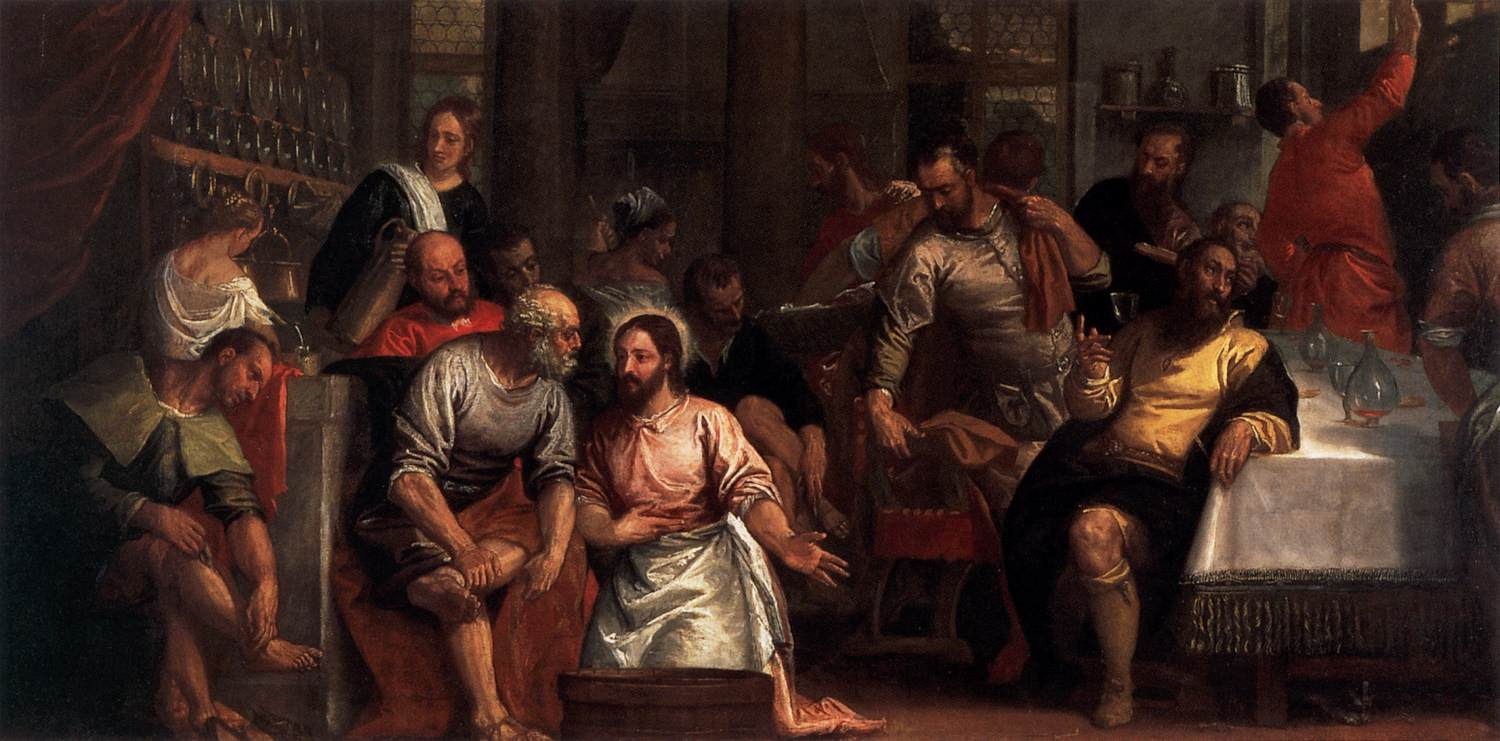
Christ Washing the Disciples' Feet, National Gallery, Prague
