= Christ and the Woman Taken in Adultery (Rubens) =

Painting by Peter Paul Rubens

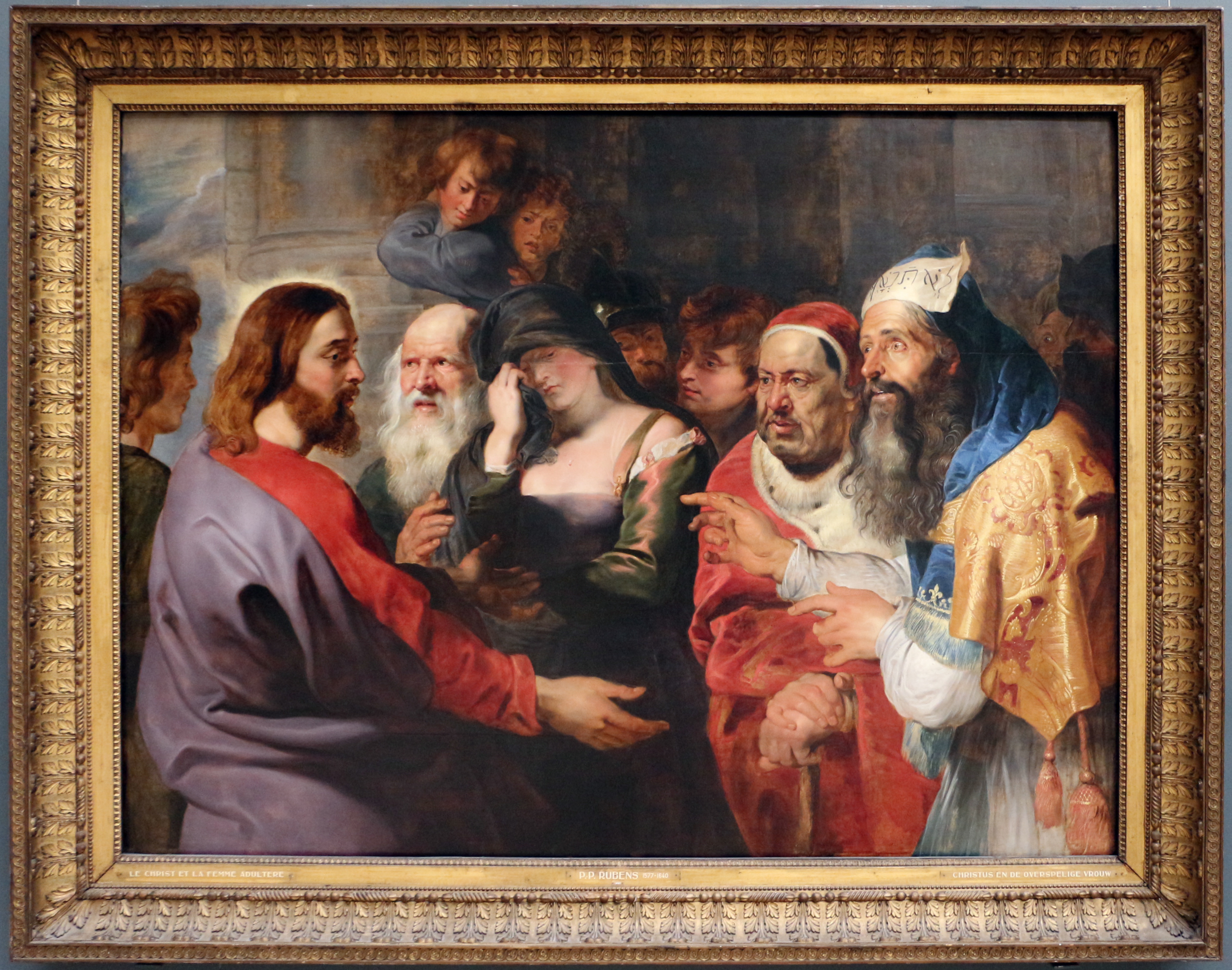

Christ and the Woman Taken in Adultery is an oil on panel painting by Peter Paul Rubens, now in the Royal Museum of Fine Arts of Belgium, which bought it at Christie's in London on 13 May 1899 at the sale of the collection of Sir Cecil Miles, 3rd Baronet.

== Sources ==
- "Catalogue entry".
