= Christ and the Canaanite Woman (Carracci) =

Painting by Annibale Carracci

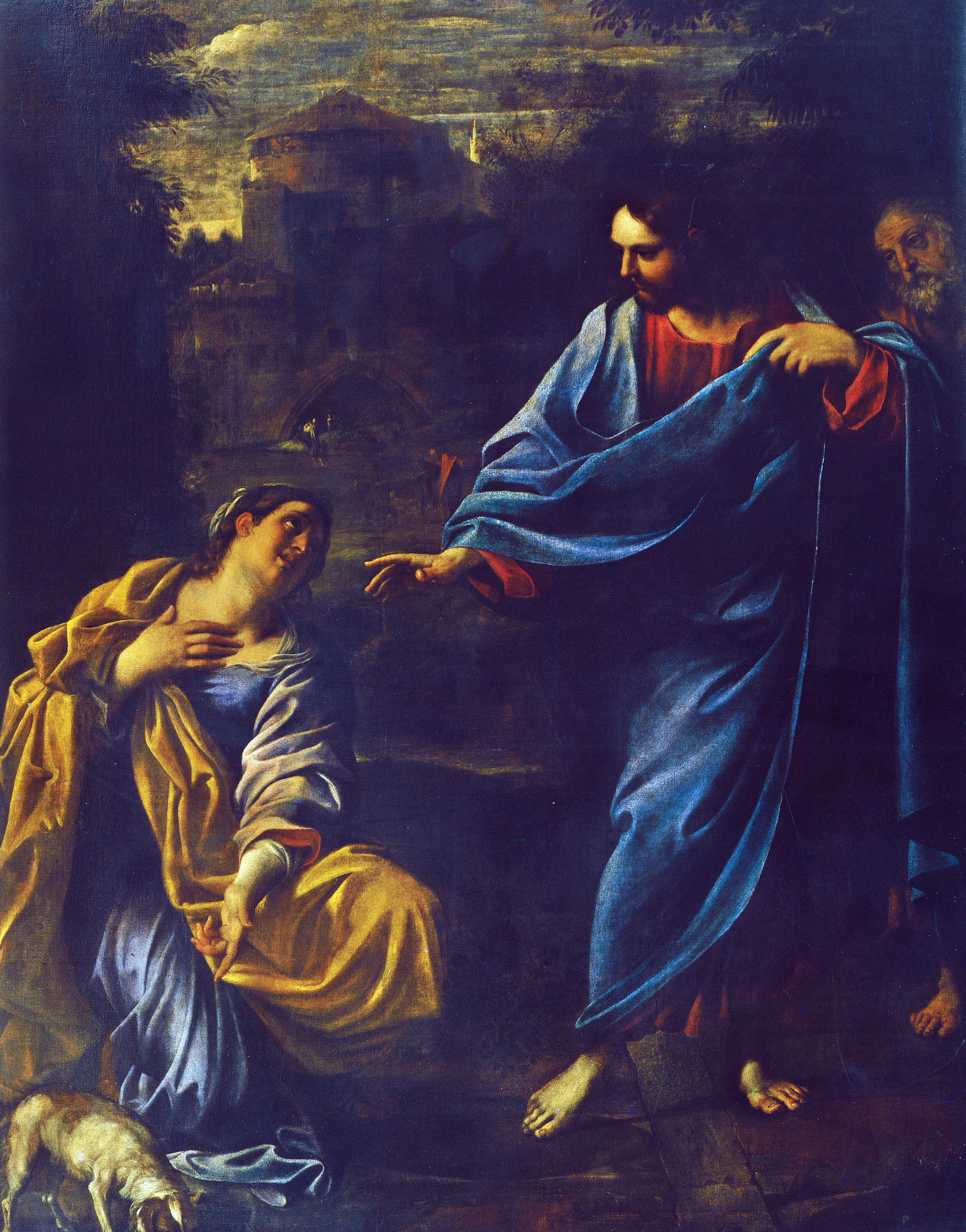
Christ and the Canaanite Woman (1594–1595) by Annibale Carracci

Christ and the Canaanite Woman is an oil painting on canvas executed ca. 1594–1595 by the Italian painter Annibale Carracci, now in the Pinacoteca Stuard in Parma.

The work was mentioned by Carlo Cesare Malvasia, who, in Felsina Pittrice, called it "the famous Canaanite Woman. Giovanni Pietro Bellori wrote that "For the chapel of the same palazzo [i.e. Palazzo Farnese] he painted the painting of the Canaanite Woman, prostrate before Christ in an act of supplication; mentioning that she, the dog, who eats the crumbs, whilst Christ assures the woman with his hand, and approves her great faith. These two figures are in front of a view of trees with distant rural buildings, and it is a great shame that it is in such a poor condition, celebrated for its beauty".

From the context of this passage from Bellori's Lives it seems to be deduced that the Christ and the Canaanite Woman was the first painting executed by Annibale in the service of Cardinal Odoardo Farnese, as soon as he arrived in Rome (perhaps already during his first brief stay in 1594, which preceded his definitive transfer to Rome in 1595).

== History ==
The work, like the rest of the Farnese Collection, migrated first to Parma (where it is attested in a seventeenth-century inventory of Palazzo del Giardino, the Parma seat of the Farnese collections) and then, in the eighteenth century, to Naples.

Subsequently, however, all traces of the painting were lost, a loss that favored the spread of the opinion, supported by some art historians, that Annibale's Canaanite Woman was to be identified with the version kept in the museum of Dijon.

Only in 1981 was the painting "rediscovered" by Charles Dempsey, an American art historian and scholar of Annibale Carracci, who identified the original of the Canaanite Woman in the canvas preserved in the Palazzo Comunale in Parma.

Among the considerations that led the historian to consider the Parma painting to be autograph, there is also the identification, in the room that once housed the chapel in Palazzo Farnese, of the stucco frame of Annibale's work, whose measurements coincide with the canvas found by Dempsey.

This attribution has never been questioned, while for the Dijon painting, now considered a copy albeit of high quality, the author has been identified as François Bonnemer, a French painter and engraver whose stay in Rome during the seventeenth century is documented.

== Description and style ==
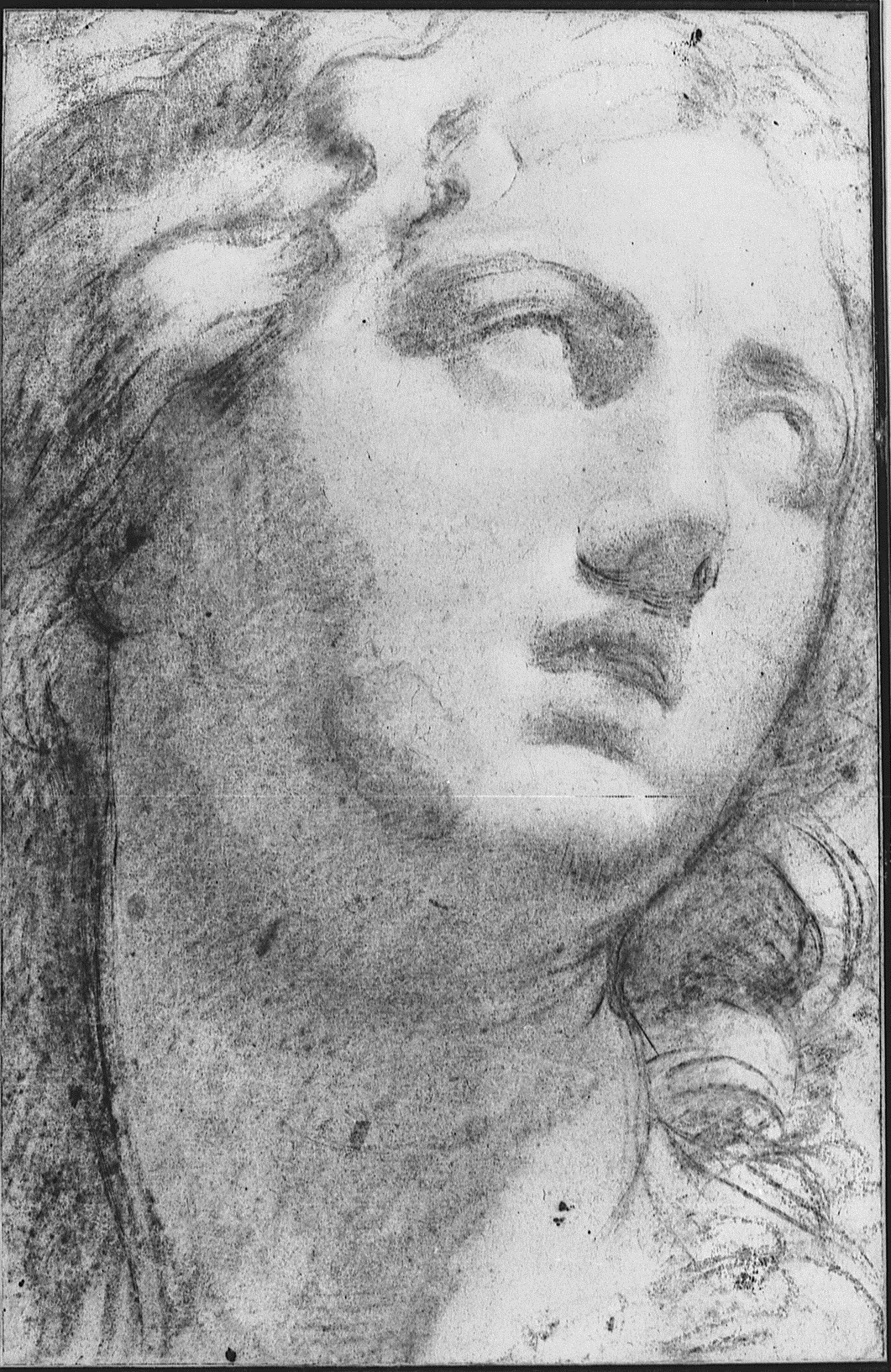
Annibale Carracci, Niobe, 1595–1598, Windsor Castle, Royal Collection

The painting depicts a Gospel episode narrated by Matthew and Mark. During his preaching, Jesus is implored by a Canaanite woman (that is, from the region of Canaan, therefore a pagan) to heal her sick (or demon-possessed) daughter. Jesus, because of the woman's non-Jewish faith, is apparently scornful, but having noted her conversion, he grants her request by healing the Canaanite woman's daughter, as the woman will verify as soon as she returns home to the child.

Probably Annibale's first Roman work, the canvas is still strongly linked to the legacy Carracci brought with him from Bologna. What is particularly striking is the affinity this painting shows with the canvas of the same subject painted a couple of years earlier by his cousin Ludovico Carracci, as part of the decorative campaign for Palazzo Sampieri in Bologna, in which Annibale himself and Agostino Carracci participated.

However, it is disputed whether Annibale's Canaanite Woman can be directly related to Correggio's Noli me tangere, with which it also seems to show compositional similarities. In fact, although this work was in Bologna for a certain time, it is unknown whether Annibale (then) ever saw it.

According to some critical positions, the youngest of the Carraccis would have known this painting by Correggio only after its entry into the Roman collections of Pietro Aldobrandini (in 1598), as demonstrated by the reference he makes to it in some works subsequent to this date. The similarity of the Cananea of Parma with the painting by Correggio would be limited – in this interpretation – to a second-hand quotation, that is, derived from the Cananea by Ludovico, who perhaps knew the Noli me tangere by Correggio already when the painting was in Bologna.

Although the canvas dates back (as it seems) to the very first period of Carracci's stay in Rome, it nevertheless already reveals a first reaction to the stimuli that the Eternal City could offer him. In the face of the Canaanite Woman, in fact, one can see a transposition of the face of the statue of Niobe, part of the "Niobids Group", once at the Villa Medici on the Pincian Hill and now at the Uffizi. The face is reproduced by Carracci also in one of his most famous drawings

The many known copies of Annibale's Cananea (in addition to the one in Dijon) and the engravings that have been made from it (among which those by Pietro del Pò and Carlo Cesi are noteworthy) prove, together with the accounts by Bellori and Malvasia, the fame that this work enjoyed.

== Gallery ==
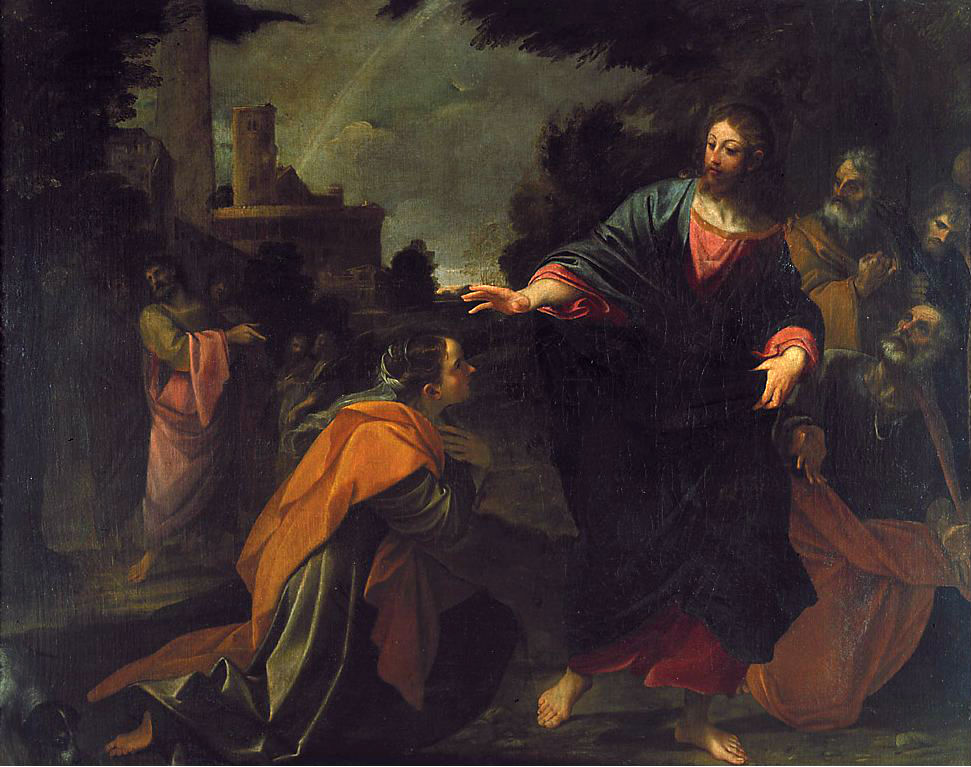
Ludovico Carracci, Christ and the Canaanite Woman, circa 1593, Pinacoteca di Brera, Milan

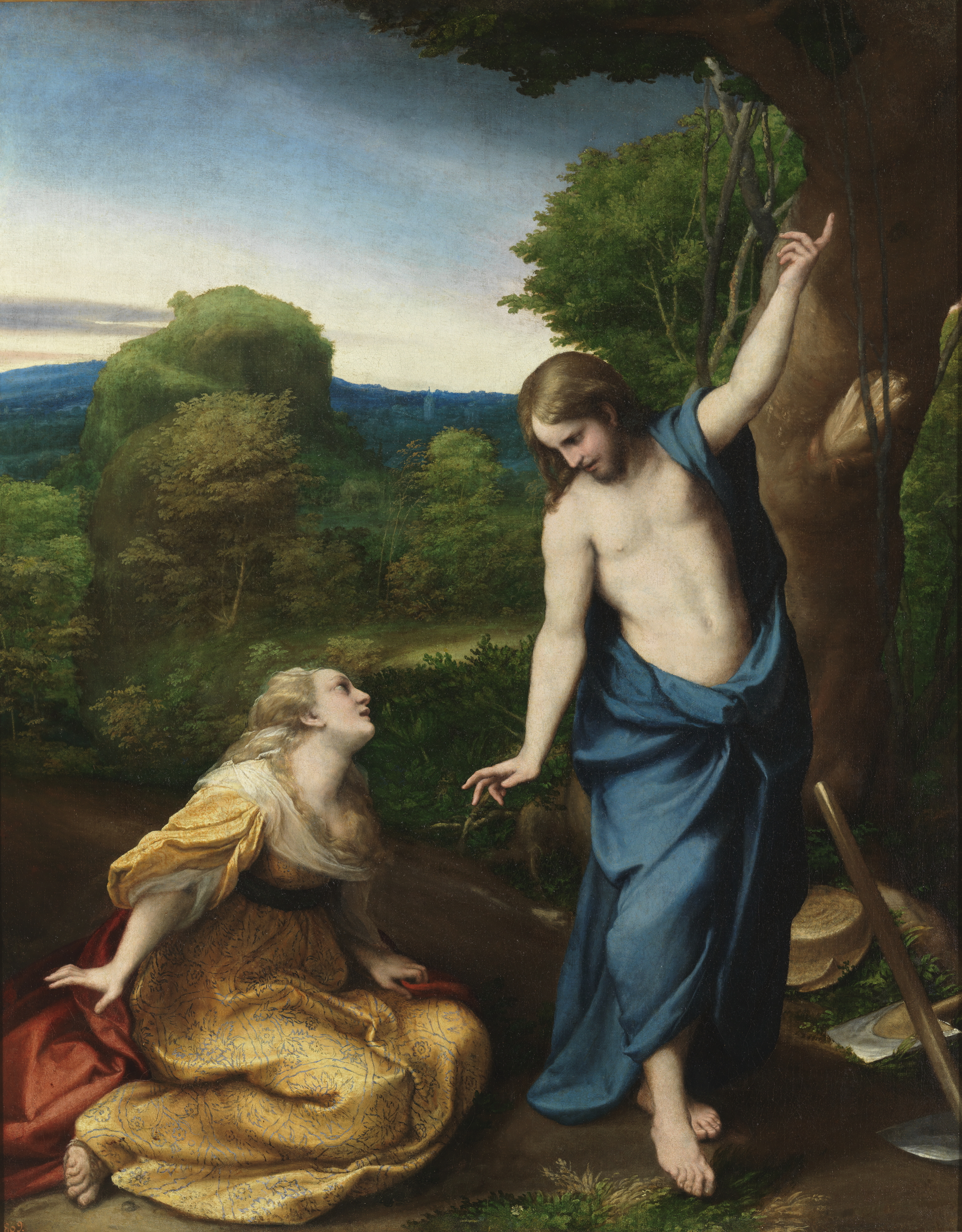
Correggio, Noli me tangere, circa 1525, Museo del Prado, Madrid

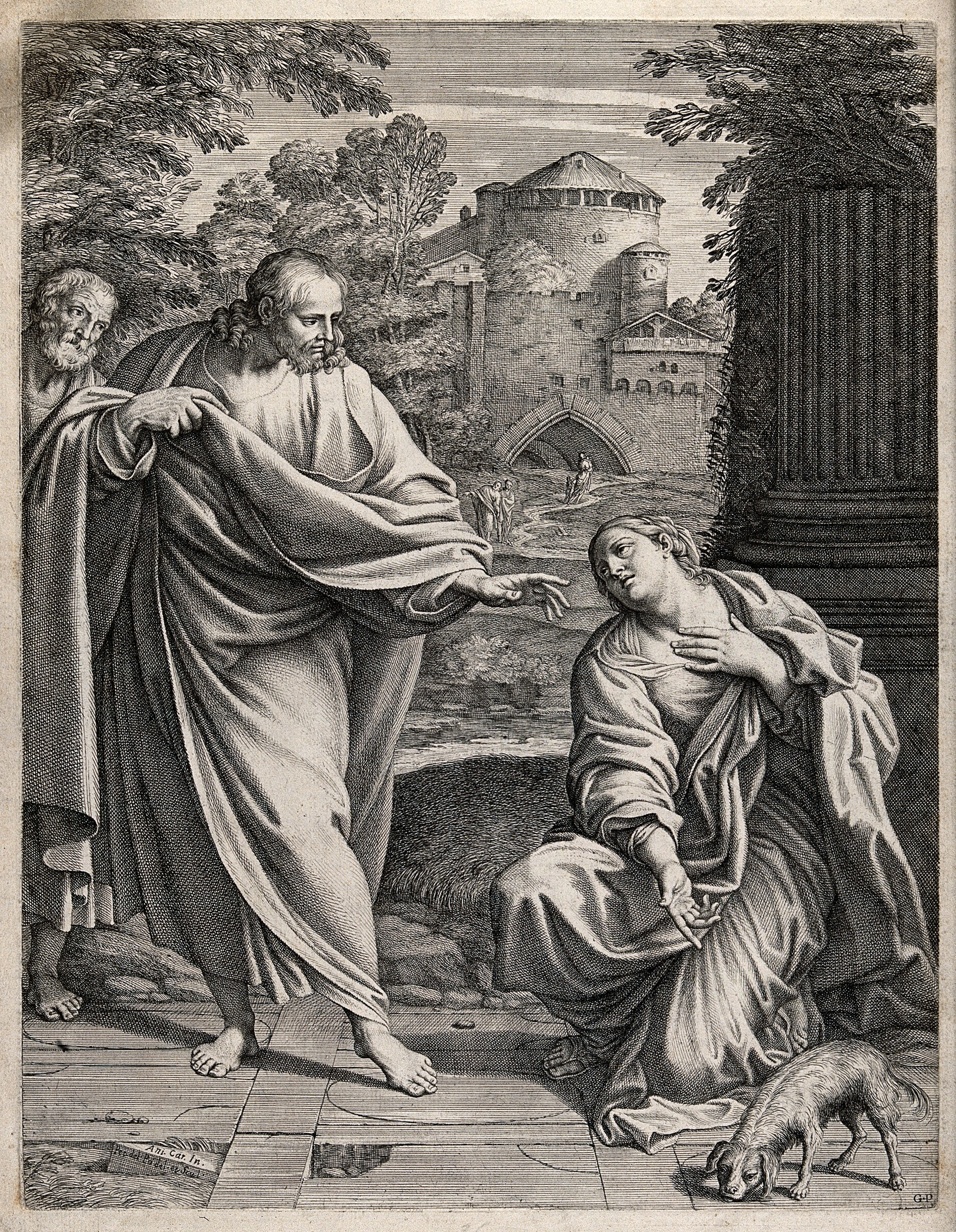
Print of the work by Pietro del Pò

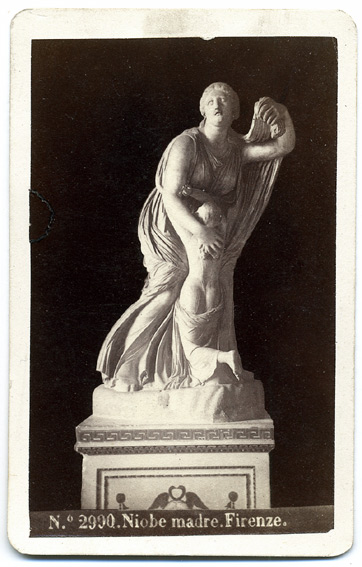
Niobe, Uffizi, Florence

== See also ==
- Matthew 15:27
