= Christ and the Woman Taken in Adultery (Beckmann) =

Painting by Max Beckmann

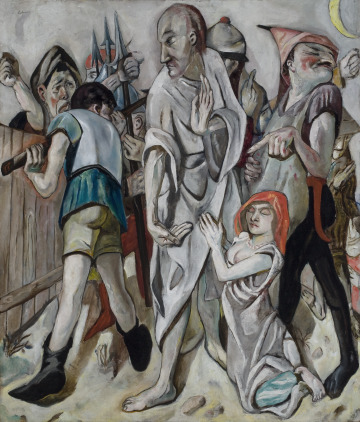
- Artist: Max Beckmann
- Year: 1917
- Medium: Oil on canvas
- Dimensions: 149.2 cm × 126.7 cm (58.7 in × 49.9 in)
- Location: Saint Louis Art Museum; St. Louis

Christ and the Woman Taken in Adultery is an oil-on-canvas expressionist painting by German artist Max Beckmann, executed in 1917. The painting is in the collection of the Saint Louis Art Museum.

== Description and analysis ==
The painting was influenced by Beckmann's study of German Renaissance painters, especially Matthias Grünewald. It is a free interpretation of the episode of the Gospel of John, when Jesus saved a woman taken in adultery from those who wanted to stone her. Jesus appears at the center of the composition, having the adulteress, wearing a red veil with eyes closed and breasts visible, with her hands folded, begging for mercy, at his feet. They are surrounded by several angry people, including soldiers, only three of whose faces are visible. One of them, behind a fence at the left, carries two rocks on his hands, while another, at the right, is pointing to the woman. Some carry spears. The presence of soldiers can be interpreted as an anti-war reference, since they are not in the Gospel's narrative.

Stephan Lackner wrote of the painting:

This picture could almost be called "a drama of hands." The variety and expressiveness of these hands and their gestures are incredible. If one could see nothing but Jesus' right hand, one would know that here a poor soul is being received into the mild, deep space of divine protection. Christ's left hand, shaped like an elongated Gothic arch, defends the sinner, pushing back insults and menaces. These gently energetic, almost elegant hands are counterpointed by the passive, soft hands of the adulteress praying in quiet confidence. The mocking, cruelly aggressive forefinger of the clownish scoffer; the rude fists shaking furiously in the air on the left; the lancer's hands bent back by the impact of the crowd's hatred – this is an assembly of characters in the shape of hands.

The piece is representative of the change in Beckmann's style that occurred after his experiences in World War I. It was one of the first paintings that he did after being discharged.

== Provenance ==
The painting was purchased by the Kunsthalle Mannheim from the artist in 1919, and remained in that collection until 1937. It was seized during the purge of modern art by the Nazi regime in 1927, and shown the same year in the so-called degenerate art exhibition. It was bought to the Buchholz Gallery, in New York, by Curt Valentin, probably in 1938, where it stayed until 1955. It was bequested to the Saint Louis Art Museum in 1955.
