= Sant'Eframo Nuovo Friary =

Friary in Naples, Italy

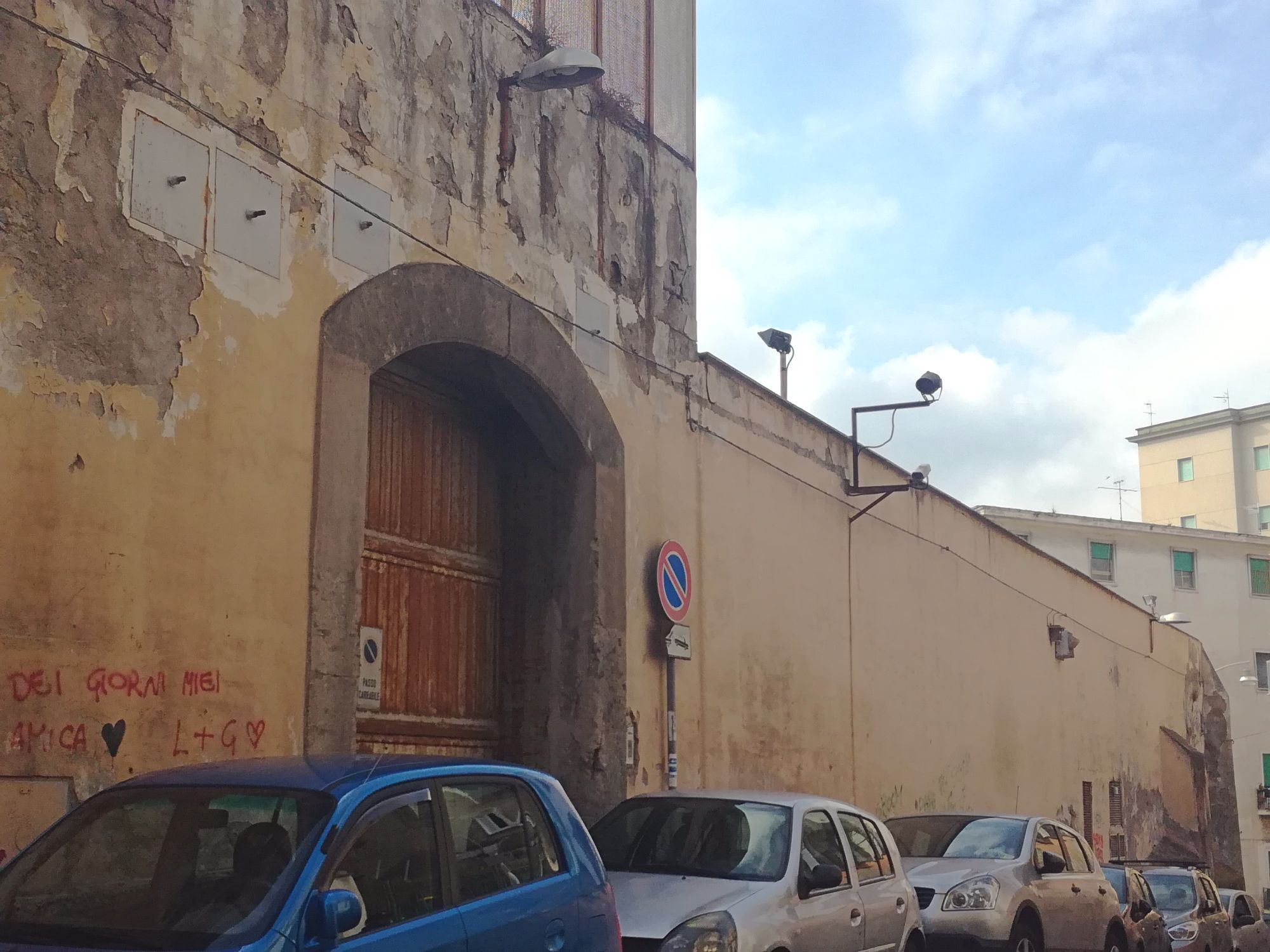
One of the entrances

Sant'Eframo Nuovo Friary was a Capuchin friary in Naples, Italy. It is named after saint Efremus and was sited on via Matteo Renato Imbriani in the Materdei rione. It was founded in 1572 on a site belonging to Gianfrancesco Di Sangro, prince of Sansevero, given to the monks by the Neapolitan noblewoman Fabrizia Carafa. The monastery church was founded in 1661, but the monastery was suppressed in 1886 as part of the anti-clerical policy of the new Kingdom of Italy.
