= Jan van Troyen =

Flemish engraver and etcher (1610–1670)

- Born: 1610
- Died: 1670 (aged 59–60)
- Occupation: Engraving

Jan van Troyen (1610–1670) was a Flemish engraver and etcher. He is mainly known for the work he did for David Teniers the Younger on the illustrations for the Theatrum Pictorium, a publication which gave an overview of the paintings in the collection of the Archduke Leopold Wilhelm.

He accompanied Teniers to Vienna after the Archduke Leopold Wilhelm returned there in 1658. He was there presumably to make engravings after paintings in the Archduke's cabinet that were to be published in the 1673 version. He is last recorded in Brussels in 1670 and 1671.

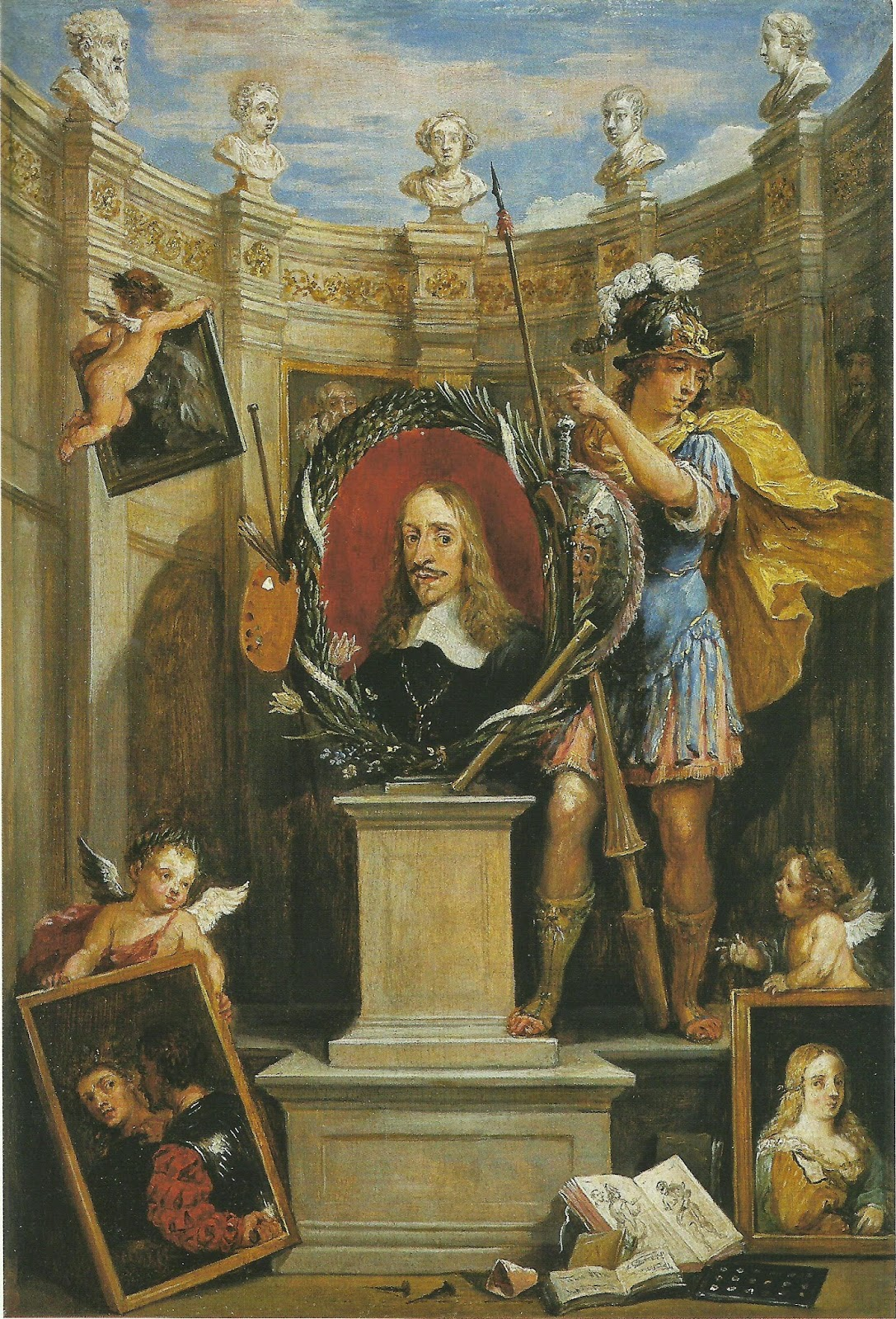
Modello for the frontispiece for the Theatrum Pictorium, by Teniers

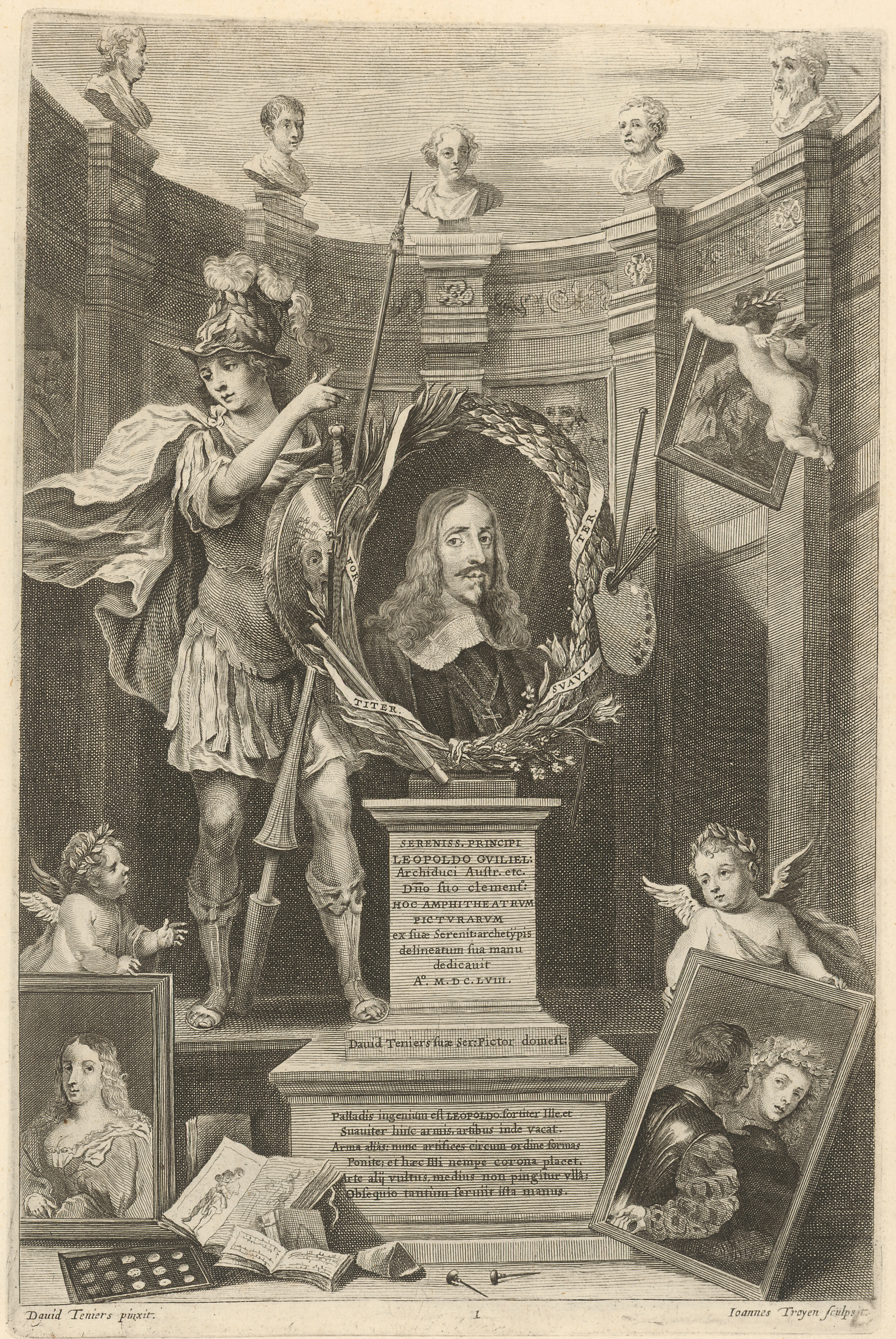
Frontispiece engraved by Jan van Troyen

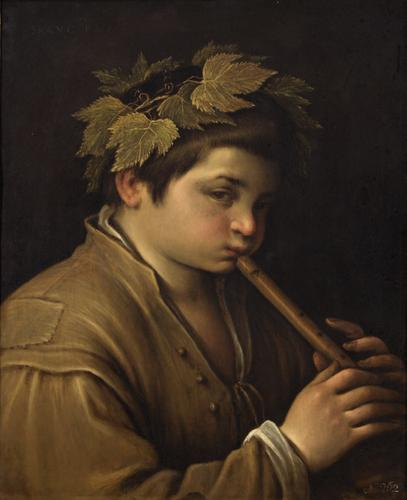
Example of a painting by Francesco Bassano the Younger in the Kunsthistorisches Museum

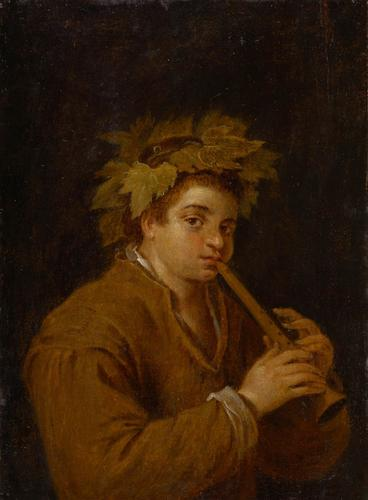
Example of a modello by David Teniers the Younger after Bassano, also in the Kunsthistorisches Museum

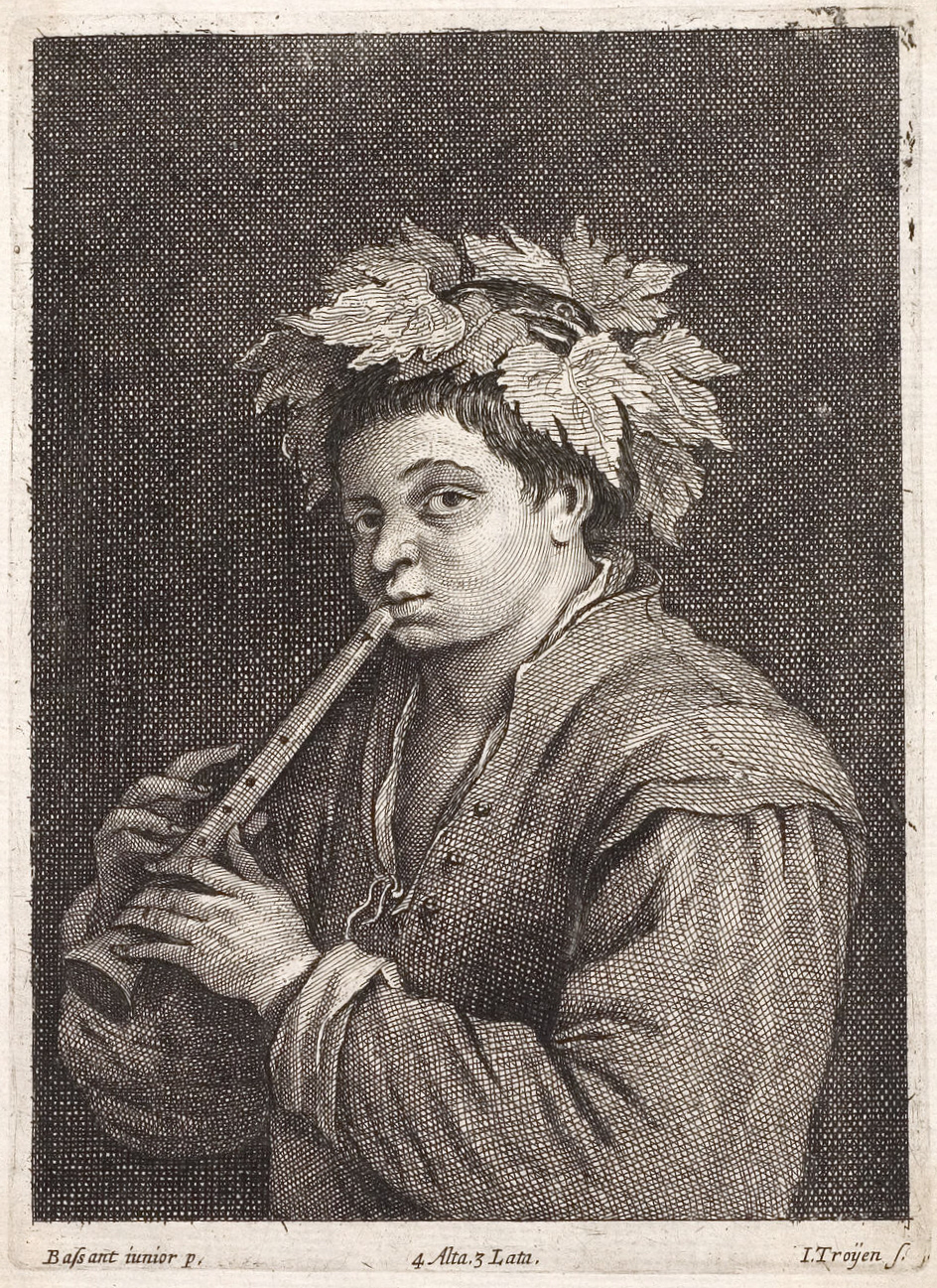
Example of an engraving from the first, 1660, edition of the Theatrum Pictorium by Jan van Troyen after the Bassano painting

Most of his works are engravings of Italian paintings in the Archduke's cabinet. He was possibly related to the painter of Italianate landscapes Rombout van Troyen.
