= Daniell =

Daniell is a surname. Notable people with the surname include:

- Alexander Daniell (1599–1668), Cornish landowner
- Alfred Daniell (1853–1937), British physicist
- Ave Daniell (1914–1999), American (gridiron) footballer
- Charles Daniell (1827–1889), Major-General, British Army
- David Daniell (author) (1929–2016), biographer of William Tyndale
- David Daniell (cyclist) (born 1989), English competitive cyclist
- David Daniell (musician) (born 1972), American guitarist and composer
- David Scott Daniell (1906–1965)
- De'Anyers family
- Edward Daniell (cricketer) (1815–1875), English cricketer
- Edward Thomas Daniell (1804–1842), English landscape painter and etcher
- Francis Henry Blackburne Daniell (1845–1921) was an Anglo-Irish barrister and historian
- Geoffrey Daniell (1516–1586)
- George Daniell (medical doctor) (1864–1937), medical practitioner and anaesthesiologist
- George Daniell (photographer) (1911–2002), American photographer
- George Daniell (priest) (1853–1931), English Anglican priest
- Georgiana Fanny Shipley Daniell (1836–1894), philanthropist
- Gladys Daniell (1884–1962)
- Harold Daniell (1909–1967), British racing motorcyclist
- Henry Daniell (1894–1963), British actor
- Jim Daniell (1918–1983), American (gridiron) footballer
- John Daniell (English sportsman) (1878–1963), English rugby player and cricketer
- John Daniell (New Zealand rugby player) (born 1972), New Zealand writer and rugby player
- John Frederic Daniell (1790–1845), British chemist and physicist
- Leaf Daniell (1877–1913)
- Louisa Daniell (1808–1871), philanthropist
- Madeline Daniell (1832–1906)
- Marcus Daniell (born 1989), New Zealand tennis player
- Martin H. Daniell (born 1935)
- Percy John Daniell (1889–1946), British mathematician
- Sir Peter Daniell MP (1584–1652) see also De'Anyers family
- Robert Daniell (1646–1718), Governor of North Carolina
- Roy Daniell (born 1965)
- Samuel Daniell (1775–1811), English landscape painter
- Thomas Daniell (1749–1840), RA, English landscape painter
- Warren Daniell (1826–1913), US Representative
- William Daniell (died 1604) (1531–1604) was the member of the Parliament of England for Marlborough
- William Daniell (1665–1698) was the member of the Parliament of England for Marlborough
- William Daniell (1769–1837), RA, English landscape and marine painter, and engraver
- William Coffee Daniell (1792–1868), American physician
- William Freeman Daniell (1818–1865), British army surgeon and botanist
- William Swift Daniell (1865–1933), American painter

Other

- Daniell Revenaugh (1934–2021)
- Daniell Smith-Christopher
- Daniell Zeleny (born 1988)

== See also ==
- Daniell cell, an electrochemical cell invented by John Frederick Daniell
- Daniell integral, a generalized form of mathematical integral proposed by Percy Daniell
- Daniell (crater), a lunar crater named after John Frederic Daniell
- Cape Daniell
- Daniell Peninsula
- Lake Daniell
