= Francis Dukinfield Astley =

English poet and art collector (1781–1825)

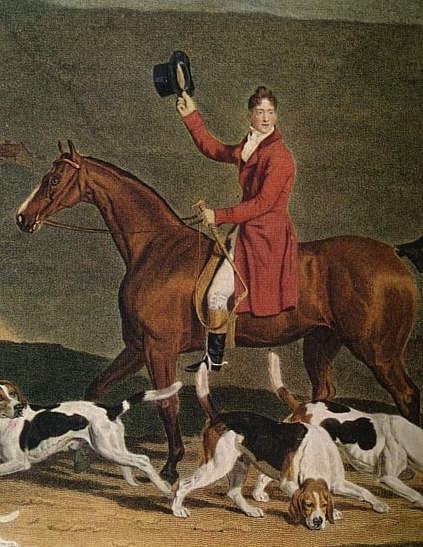
- Detail from Richard Woodman's engraving of Francis Dukinfield Astley and his Harriers (1809), originally painted by Benjamin Marshall
- Born: 17 July 1781; Dukinfield Lodge, Ashton-under-Lyne, Cheshire
- Died: 23 July 1825 (aged 44); Horwick House, Buxton, Derbyshire

Francis Dukinfield Astley (1781–1825) was an English poet, art collector, agriculturalist, industrialist, and High Sheriff of Cheshire. As a patron of the arts he was influential in the development of Manchester's first cultural institutions in the early 19th century.

When he died unexpectedly there were widespread rumours—never proven—that he was poisoned by his brother-in-law, Whig politician Thomas Gisborne.

== Early life ==
Astley's father, John Astley, came from a modest family in Shropshire, but travelled to Rome and Florence in his twenties to study art, and there managed to eke out a living making copies of works by famous painters like Titian. He later moved to Dublin for several years and established a career as a portrait painter, which he successfully continued once he finally returned to England. While his clients among the gentry and nobility praised his work, more discerning critics of the time considered him unexceptional—Horace Walpole wrote that "he has got too much into the style of the four thousand English painters about town, and is so intolerable as to work for money, not for fame," while Samuel Redgrave wrote that his "character and expression" were "weak."

This poor critical assessment, in part, reflected upper class distaste for John Astley's reputation as "a ladykiller of the first water." Known as "Beau Astley" for his charm and good looks, he married three times. His first wife, whom he met in Ireland, died giving birth to their only child, Sophia—an ancestor of Sebastian Coe. His second marriage came in 1759 to Penelope Dukinfield Daniel, the wealthy widow of Sir William Dukinfield Daniel, the 3rd holder of the Dukinfield baronetcy. Penelope died only three years later, in 1762, and both the baronetcy and her substantial wealth and land holdings—the Dukinfield estate near Ashton-under-Lyne in Cheshire—were inherited by her only daughter, Henrietta, who lived in an asylum due to mental illness.

After Penelope died John Astley turned his attention to architecture, buying Schomberg House on Pall Mall in London and converting it into apartments and an artist's studio. He continued his womanising ways among London's elite while earning praise for his work remodelling clients' homes. His stepdaughter then died in 1771, and while the baronetcy passed to Sir William's cousin it was Astley who inherited her wealth and land. He sold Schomberg and moved back north to the Dukinfield estate and began his most ambitious architectural project: Dukinfield Lodge, a mansion intended to be his family's new home, which was mostly completed by 1775. It was designed around a large octagonal saloon which he filled with a substantial art collection gathered from across Europe, including several Old Masters as well as some paintings of his own.

Francis Dukinfield Astley's mother, Mary Wagstaffe, was his father's third wife—one of three daughters of a prominent local surgeon who were collectively known as "the Manchester beauties." He was their third child together, and oldest son; he and all of his full siblings were born at Dukinfield Lodge.

== Inheritance ==
Astley was only six years old when his father died in 1787. John Astley's profligacy—spending more than £50,000 alone on building Dukinfield Lodge and filling it with art—meant that the family's finances were largely depleted by the time of his death; one critic said of him that "he owed his fortune to his form; his follies to his fortune!" These financial issues were partly alleviated by Astley's mother's second marriage, in 1793, to Reverend William Robert Hay, a wealthy solicitor and magistrate who would later become infamous for his role in the Peterloo Massacre.

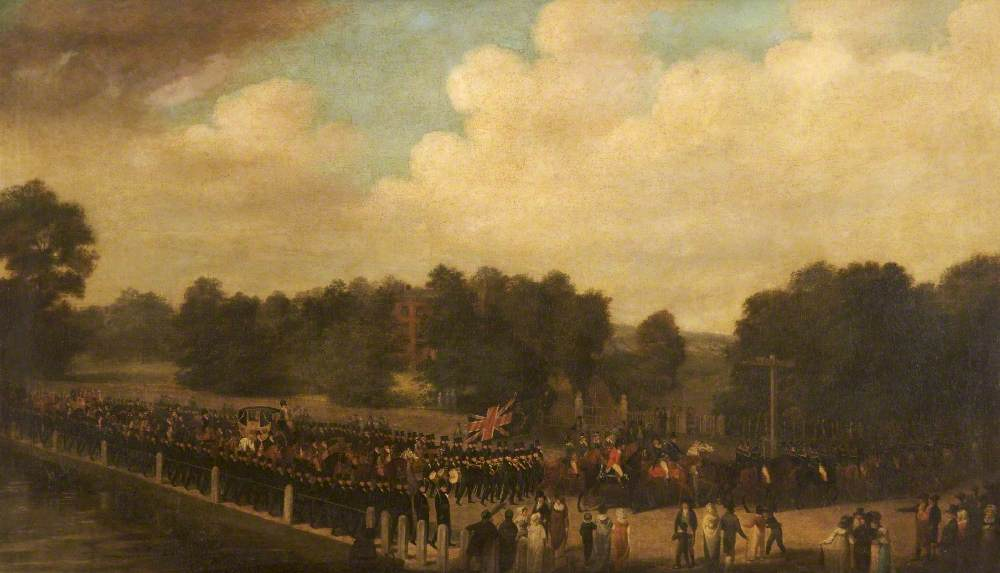
Francis Dukinfield Astley in Procession as High Sheriff (c.1806/07), unknown artist

The young Astley was sent away to board at Rugby School, and then study at Christ Church, Oxford. When he returned he immediately took an active role in managing the family's estate, pursuing a number of ventures to try and improve its profitability. He quickly gained a reputation as an "enlightened landlord," showing concern for his tenants' welfare during the economic slump brought on by the Napoleonic Wars by pausing rent collections and distributing money to those in need in the wider community.

He had a particular interest in new developments in agriculture and forestry and encouraged his farming tenants to experiment with ways of improving their yields, presenting engraved silver cups to those who displayed particular excellence. In 1807 he won a silver medal from the Society for the Improvement of Agriculture for having planted 40,000 trees across his Dukinfield estate, and published Hints to Planters, a book detailing his research into raising a wide variety of trees from seed, the same year. In 1812 he wrote to the journal of the Society for the Encouragement of Arts, Manufactures, and Commerce with news that one of his tenants, James Ogden, had invented a device for quickly and easily pruning trees ("the Dukinfield Pruner") which had been adopted across the region, and urged the Society to reward Ogden for his ingenuity (which it did, with a prize of ten guineas).

Bells were rung across Ashton-under-Lyne on his 25th birthday in 1804 and a large crowd gathered to celebrate. He served two non-consecutive terms as High Sheriff of Cheshire in 1806 and 1807, and similarly large crowds gathered to celebrate his inaugurations, one of which was commemorated in an oil painting by an unknown artist.

He also became a keen fox hunter, and commissioned the construction of Hunters' Tower, a lodge and stables dedicated to "festive enjoyment," to provide a home for the county's various hunting clubs. Astley wrote "A Hunting Song for a Snowy Day" to commemorate its opening on 27 February 1807. Benjamin Marshall painted Astley hunting in 1809 in Francis Dukinfield Astley and his Harriers, which was widely reproduced as an engraving by Richard Woodman. Hunters' Lodge later became a meeting house for Whigs in the Stalybridge area in the wake of the Reform Act 1832.

The pre-Astley Dukinfields had historically supported local dissenting non-Anglican Protestants by allowing them to construct a chapel (now Dukinfield Old Chapel) on their estate in 1706, which then also became the family's traditional burial place; in 1810, Astley gave the chapel more space for the establishment of a Sunday school, and one of his final acts before his death in 1825 was to formally hand ownership of the land to the chapel's trustees—against the wishes of his stepfather, who had wanted it granted to the Church of England instead.

Astley was appointed a justice of the peace in 1813. He was a freemason, and became Provincial Grand Master of the Cheshire Masonic Lodges in 1814.

== Poetry & art ==
=== Poet ===
Astley wrote poetry from a young age, and also painted as a hobby. He continued to expand the art collection at Dukinfield Lodge that his father had started—however, despite Astley's fondness for art he was not as well-educated on the subject as his father, and his reputation as a wealthy (yet not discerning) collector meant that he was a frequent target of unscrupulous dealers. In 1809, John Robinson Blakey visited Astley at Dukinfield Lodge and identified a number of valuable paintings in the collection which he told Astley were actually forgeries; he convinced Astley to "get rid of this rubbish—of this antique stuff—of this lumber that [is not] worth house-room" by letting Blakey buy them for a fraction of their real value, while at the same time successfully convincing Astley to purchase some of Blakey's own fakes, which were attributed to "the most distinguished masters who ever attended the Italian or Flemish schools." Astley discovered he had been conned shortly after, and successfully sued Blakey for the return of his money and paintings.

Astley wrote his most critically acclaimed poem—Varnishando, "a serio comic poem addressed to collectors of paintings"—the same year about his experiences with "such Goths, who would overrun the Empire of the Arts." He followed it in 1810 with Graphomania, another poem on the same subject which was also well received.

His poetry was published widely, and collected volumes of his works were published first in 1819, and then again after his death in 1825.

=== Art patron ===
In the early 19th century several of the industrialising cities of Northern England had started to develop self-sustaining artistic communities with institutions similar to London's Royal Academy of Art—however, Manchester was a conspicuous laggard relative to peer cities like Liverpool and Birmingham, with a reputation for philistinism that would endure well into the Victorian era.

Astley, as one of the wealthiest men in the region, provided crucial support to young artists, musicians, and writers who otherwise could not have afforded to pursue their ambitions: he was the first patron of a young John Ralston in the early 1810s, and allowed him to practice his technique by copying paintings in the Lodge's collection. He was an early patron of antiquarian James Butterworth—when Butterworth was struggling to find subscribers for one of his first books a friend sought out Astley to ask if he would make a bulk purchase of ten copies, but Astley insisted on buying one hundred copies instead. He was also one of the first subscribers of the Stalybridge Old Band—which was formed by some local teenagers in 1809 and grew into one of the most successful brass bands of its era—and donated £2 2s every year from 1814 until his death.

In 1823, a group of local artists came together and voted to establish "the Manchester Institution for the Promotion of Literature, Science, and the Arts," a building which would contain art galleries (for annual exhibitions of works by local artists), lecture theatres, a library, and research laboratories. Astley was one of the first (and most generous) patrons of what would become the Royal Manchester Institution, donating £42 in 1823 towards the purchase of a plot of land on Mosley Street in Manchester for the construction of its headquarters.

== Family ==
Astley married Susan Fyshe Palmer, from Ickwell in Bedfordshire, in 1812. Together they had two sons: their first, John Dukinfield Astley, accidentally fell out of a window and died in 1813, aged only 16 weeks; their second son, Francis Dukinfield Palmer Astley, was born on 24 April 1825, only a few months before his father's death.

He also allegedly had an illegitimate son, William Astley, with Jenny Lightfoot, a local woman in Ashton-under-Lyne; William was born in 1803 and baptised at Dukinfield Old Chapel, with Astley recorded as his father, but he is reported to have struggled with insanity his entire life before dying in Lymm in 1843.

Susan's sister, Elizabeth Fyshe Palmer, married Thomas Gisborne in 1811. Gisborne came from a wealthy political family which had produced several mayors of Derby, and aside from his large estates in Derbyshire and Staffordshire he was also a successful coal, lime, and sand merchant in Manchester. Two of his brothers-in-law, William Evans and Charles Fyshe Palmer, were both members of parliament elected on platforms for parliamentary reform, and Gisborne himself would also become a liberal, reforming MP in 1830 when he was elected as the Whig representative for Stafford.

== Financial difficulties & recovery ==
Like many large landowners of the time, Astley sought out new opportunities made possible by the Industrial Revolution—however, his attempt at establishing an iron smelting works on his estate was a resounding (and expensive) failure. Though he was determined to make his estates profitable, he had also inherited his father's fondness for splurging on parties, drinking, and art, and—combined with his tendency to impulsive philanthropy—he was eventually forced into bankruptcy in May 1817.

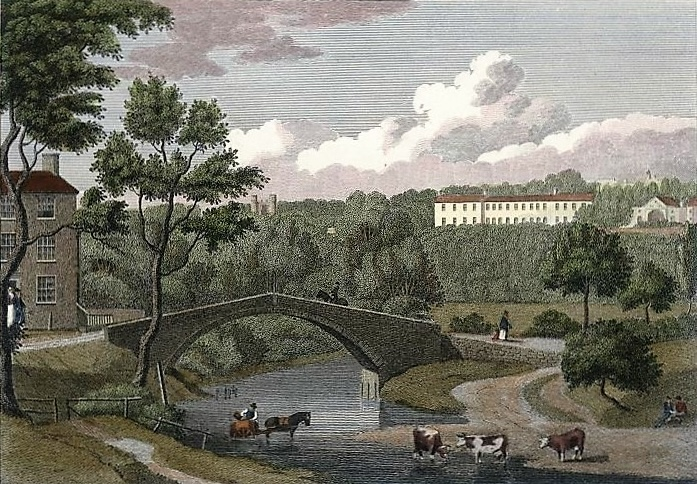
View of Dukinfield Lodge (1795), engraved by William Ellis after a painting by Edward Dayes

The vast majority of Astley's personal belongings at Dukinfield Lodge—including the art collection started by his father—were put up for auction in August 1817 at Winstanley & Sons in Manchester by his creditors to settle his debts. Though most of the collection almost certainly consisted of copies (many of which were painted by John Astley during his time in Italy), the auction catalogue boasted only of a number of "original" works, including St. John Preaching in the Wilderness by Cornelis Bloemart, The Judgement of Paris by Giorgione, Christ and St. John by Leonardo da Vinci, Christ Sleeping in his Cross by Guido Reni, and more by Jan Dirksz Both, Salvator Rosa, Carlo Dolci, Philips Wouwermans, Cornelis van Poelenburgh, Jan Wijnants, Richard Westall, and John Francis Rigaud. However, the highlight of the collection was a verified original "masterpiece" by Titian, The Woman Taken in Adultery, which only received a maximum bid of 1,450 guineas—less than half its reserve price of 3,000 guineas—and remained in Astley's possession; it was eventually sold by the family several years later, and is now in the collection of the Kelvingrove Art Gallery and Museum in Glasgow.

Astley's library of rare books from the 16th century—including a complete collection of the works of Piranesi—was also offered at the auction, as well as more than 1,200 bottles of wine. Advertisements listed a huge variety of goods for sale:

[A] fine bust of Napoleon, elegant French Clock, superb Set of China Jars, Indian Cabinets; a Collection of stuffed British Birds, &c. Musical Instruments, of a high Quality, consisting of a valuable Finger Organ, a brilliant-toned Pedal Harp, fine-toned upright, grand, and square Piano Fortes, a curious Silver French Horn, &c. Modern Town-built Landaulet, Barouchette, and Gig, Chariot, Harness for four Horses, brilliant Plates of Glass, of large Dimensions, modern Household Furniture, a gothic Library Bookcase, a winged Wardrobe, and other useful Articles.

His creditors also considered selling Fell Foot—a large estate overlooking Windermere in the Lake District which Astley had purchased in 1814 and extensively (and expensively) redesigned and landscaped—but decided against it.

The auction raised more than £5,000, allowing Astley to clear his debts by 1819. However, his fortunes soon dramatically improved when coal was discovered on the Dukinfield estate. These mines (along with a number of cotton mills built along the Tame around the same time) led to the urbanisation of Dukinfield, which grew from an area of farms and cottages into a fully-fledged town, distinct from neighbouring Ashton-under-Lyne. They were also crucial for the wider industrialisation of the northwest; the Astley Deep Pit in particular, opening later in 1845, would hold the distinction of becoming the deepest mine in the country, as well as the site of a notorious mining disaster.

Astley and his wife soon returned to their profligate ways as a result their new income—on New Year's Eve 1822 they held an elaborate banquet at the bottom of one of their mines in Newton, 450 feet below the surface, to celebrate the installation of new steam-powered winches designed by William Sheratt for hauling coal up to the surface.

In November 1823 Astley left his estate for six weeks to attend to business elsewhere, and tasked his mine manager—Joseph Moss—with overseeing his financial affairs in his absence. Moss, reportedly suffering from "melancholy," spent the time drinking instead, and then drowned himself by jumping into an abandoned coal pit filled with water when Astley returned and attempted to admonish him.

In February 1825 Astley was one of the largest donors to relief efforts for German victims of flooding, and for Italian and Spanish refugees living in London. He was also appointed to the board of the Manchester Ship Canal Company that same month.

== Death ==
=== Suspicious circumstances ===
On 22 July 1825 Astley visited Thomas Gisborne at his home, Horwick House near Buxton in Derbyshire, to stay for a few days and inspect one of Gisborne's collieries. On 23 July they dined together late into the evening with two other friends; Astley was found dead in bed at around 5:00 p.m. the next day by a servant, "his mouth covered with froth and blood."

A doctor, Peter Booth, attended and assessed his cause of death to be apoplexy; another doctor, John Bennett, also arrived and concurred with Booth, suggesting that Astley had fallen asleep without removing his tight collar and partially suffocated, causing him to reflexively wake up into a coughing fit that ruptured a blood vessel. Astley's stepfather, William Robert Hay, arrived the next morning after being summoned from Dukinfield and, satisfied with the doctors' assessments, decided that a coroner's inquest with a more thorough examination of the body was unnecessary; Hay was chair of the Salford sessions court, and at the time inquests were only opened in cases of obvious violence or other foul play, so officials in Derbyshire deferred to his judgement. Though the dinner had ended after midnight, Astley's date of death was recorded as 23 July.

Astley's popularity among the general public meant that his sudden death was met with widespread shock. However, the decision not to hold an inquest—and the haste to organise the funeral, allegedly due to "decomposition going on rapidly" with the body—soon led to rumours that Astley's death had occurred under suspicious circumstances, and the truth was being withheld by those responsible.

Events came to a head on 30 July, the day of the funeral at Dukinfield Old Chapel, which more than ten thousand people attended. During the service someone—who has never been identified—scattered a large number of handwritten "placards" outside the church asserting that Gisborne had poisoned Astley:

"Notice.—Mr. Astley died by poison, and no investigation has taken place; but if ever man was murdered, he is: the circumstance pronounce something behind the curtain of secrecy very like murder, and if his friends and the inhabitants of Dukinfield let it pass without his body being opened, his death lies at their door."

"Notice.—Mr. Astley has been murdered by his friend with poison, and they are interring him without investigation. Oh, let him be examined. Oh, Gisborne! What hast thou done."

"Let Mr. Astley's remains be examined by doctors, not Gisborne's, and he will be pronounced murdered; and if the inhabitants of Dukinfield suffer it to pass without investigation, his death lies at your door, for he's murdered;—there are people, if compelled to come forward, can tell something about it. MINOS."

"Gisborne's character is not good. Mr. Astley died in a manner that if he had been a poor man it must have been ascertained whether murder had been committed, and if he can't have that done he's murdered."

"Notice.—Mr. Astley is murdered, and they are interring him without investigation: he died by poison, and the assassin directs his funeral. Oh, Gisborne! Not a tear has thou shed."

Some of the placards were also stuck to the gates of Dukinfield Lodge; the most "atrocious" example was said to have contained a message directly inciting Gisborne's assassination. The Manchester Guardian mentioned the "monstrous" placards in its report on the funeral, and argued that "the avidity with which [the rumour] has been spread amongst the poorer classes, is at least a proof of the affection with which Mr. Astley was regarded by them." This left Gisborne furious—not only had the newspaper disseminated the accusation even more widely by attempting to dismiss it, but it had also done little to hide his identity as the alleged murderer. The Manchester Courier, a rival newspaper, also criticised the editorial decision to repeat the allegation.

=== Inquest ===
Gisborne demanded that a formal inquest into Astley's death be held so that he could clear his name, but the request was initially denied by a coroner in Knutsford because Astley's body had decayed so much that there would be no way of ascertaining the cause of death. He eventually managed to find two sympathetic magistrates who agreed to convene an inquest panel—made up of two doctors and seven surgeons—at an inn, the Dukinfield Arms, on 8 August 1825; William Robert Hay recused himself from the panel "owing to his connexion with the family" but still participated, both as a witness himself and to question other witnesses.

Gisborne treated the inquest like a criminal trial where he was representing himself as the defendant. He called several witnesses and, through questioning, established an agreed series of facts and events: Astley had been in poor health for some time—with an irregular heartbeat, bouts of "pressure in the head" and "giddiness" which left him "seriously alarmed," and episodes of sleep apnea, all of which were exacerbated by his excessive drinking and eating—and Dr. Bennett had warned Astley only six weeks before his death that "if you don't alter your course of life, you will certainly be dead in a short time."

Over the course of 23 July Astley had drunk several glasses of ale and "heartily" eaten multiple meals of cheese and bread, "several pots" of "preserved black currants," sweet pudding, soup, stewed tench, fried perch, mutton, sweet pudding (again), "a quantity of strawberries and cream," and some fruit; during his final dinner alone he and his three dining companions also managed to drink all of a bottle of champagne, a bottle of madeira wine, a bottle of burgundy wine, and three and a half bottles of port between them. None of the men could accurately recall Astley's condition the last time they saw him as a result, other than to concur that he was "sensibly drunk." His friends also testified that he had been noticeably less physically able in his final days due to the hot summer weather—he had had to stop during a short walk to lie down in a field due to fatigue, and when returning to Horwick House he had been unable to climb over a short wall on the property boundary which had never previously caused him any difficulties. Servants had repeatedly checked on him in bed throughout 24 July but had assumed he was still asleep until one of them finally tried to rouse him in the late afternoon, by which time his body was cold and rigor mortis had set in.

The witnesses were persuasive enough for the panel to unanimously declare that Astley had died due to "a visitation from God, and not by any violence or improper means," without the need for an autopsy. The Manchester Guardian welcomed Gisborne's vindication in an editorial, but also argued that "though the evidence was perfectly sufficient to convince every reasonable man that Mr. Astley's death was not produced by violent means—it would have been somewhat more satisfactory to the people amongst whom the reports had obtained some credence, to shew precisely what was the cause of it; and with this view the body ought certainly to have been examined." Newspapers elsewhere in the country were more sympathetic to Gisborne, pointing to the case as a "striking example" of the need for more coroner's inquests in order to prevent the spread of damaging rumours about innocent people.

However, Gisborne was still suspected more widely—suspicions which were heightened when he married Astley's widow (his deceased wife's sister) only a year later.

Much of the remainder of Astley's collections—his books, artworks, furniture, musical instruments, wines, and more—were auctioned off in the years following his death, first in September 1825 and then again in February 1828, when Titian's The Woman Taken in Adultery finally sold for the "knock-down" price of 760 guineas to Richard Bullin, co-founder of Leyland & Bullins bank with Thomas Leyland and a former mayor of Liverpool. Fell Foot and its contents were also put up for auction in 1826, but it failed to sell; the family subsequently held on to it until 1859. There are also references to "Old Masters" within the art collection at Dukinfield Lodge in the following decades, indicating that not everything was sold after Astley's death.

James Butterworth included a eulogy to Astley in his 1827 guide to Ashton-under-Lyne and the surrounding areas.

Astley's son, Francis Dukinfield Palmer Astley, inherited his remaining land and assets. Gisborne never merged his estates with those of his second wife and stepson; when he died in 1851 his will specifically noted that his eldest son from his first marriage, Thomas Guy Gisborne, would not inherit anything from the Astley side of the family.

== Notable works ==
- Hints to Planters, Collected from Various Authors of Esteemed Authority, and from Actual Observation (1807)
- Varnishando (1809)
- The Graphomania (1809)
- Poems, and Translations (1819)
