= Danelle =

Danelle is a given name. Notable people with the name include:

- Danelle Barrett (born 1967), retired U.S. Navy Rear Admiral
- Danelle Bergstrom (born 1957), Australian visual artist
- Danelle Gay, Miss Michigan USA
- Danelle German, American businesswoman and author
- Danelle Im (born 1993), South Korean ice hockey player
- Danelle Leverett, member of the JaneDear girls, an American country music duo, with Susie Brown
- Stephani Danelle Perry (born 1970), American science fiction and horror writer
- Danelle Sandoval, American singer-songwriter
- Danelle Tan (born 2004), Singaporean women's football player
- Danelle Umstead (born 1972), American alpine skier and Paralympian

== See also ==
- Danel
- Danell
- Danella
- Daniele
- Daniell
- Danielle
