= D'Anyers family =

Anglo-Norman noble family

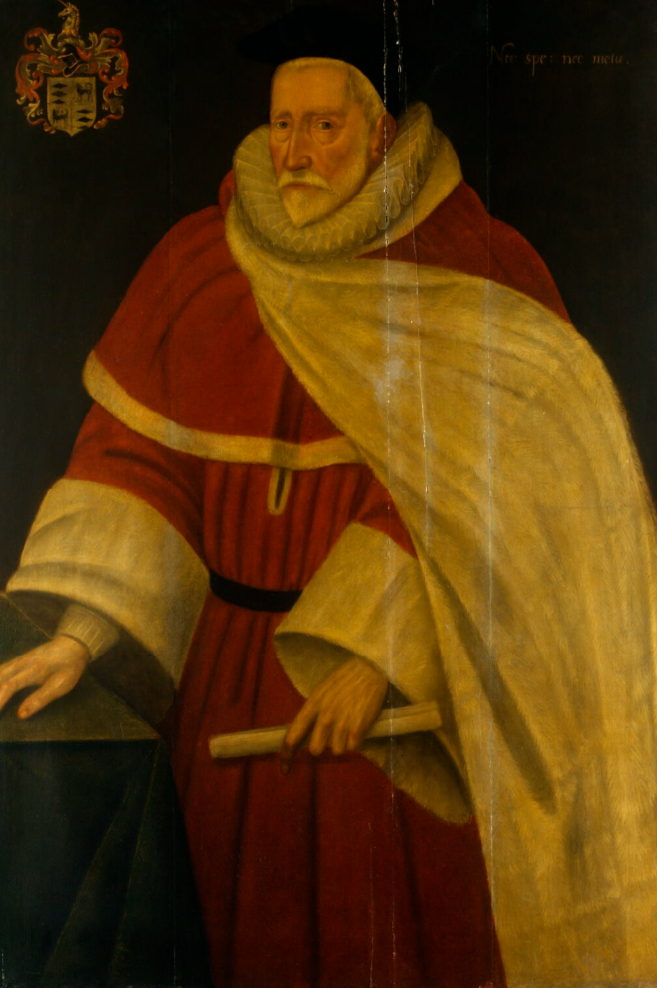
Sir William Daniell, Judge of Common Pleas c.1604 National Portrait Gallery

The D'Anyers family, also Daniell of Cheshire, were an Anglo-Norman noble family who first settled in Cheshire during the late 11th century following their arrival with William the Conqueror from Bayeux. The family are able to trace later descent from the House of Plantagenet, Counts de Salis-Soglio, Viscounts Massereene and Grosvenor family. In 1675 King Louis XIV issued letters patent granting members the titles of Marquis de Matragny and Marquis de Grangues.

The main seat of the family from the 14th century until the mid 18th century was Over Tabley Hall.

Lyme Park, granted to Sir Thomas D'Anyers in 1346, was used as Pemberley, the seat of Mr. Darcy in the 1995 BBC adaptation of Jane Austen's novel Pride and Prejudice.

The family frequently used Daniell as an anglicised version of the name, as well as D'Anyers.

The family holds the motto: "Nil Sperno, Miror, Metuo"

heavily rooted in stoicism and the concept of ataraxia, it translates to:

"I despise nothing, I astonish at nothing, I fear nothing"

== D'Anyers of Cheshire ==
The D'Anyers family, known also as the Daniell family, are one of the oldest from North West England and held extensive estates across Cheshire including Bradley, Daresbury, Tabley and Lymme Handley from the late 13th century onwards where they had long been active in county affairs, as well as estates in Normandy, Lancashire, and later Devon and Somerset.

Frances D'Anyers, later Littleton/Lyttleton by Van Dyck

Since the 14th century the family held important court, municipal, parliamentary and military positions in England and France, with many members holding knighthoods in their own right.

Following the loss of their Cheshire estates in the mid 18th century, descendants of the family moved to the South West and founded a successful shipping company with later branches holding interests in brewing and railway investments as well as estates in Lancashire, Devon and Somerset.

Notable members include: Sir Thomas D'Anyers 'Hero of Crecy', Sir Peter Daniell MP, Sir William Daniell Judge of Common Pleas, Colonel Sir Samuel Daniell, Sir William Duckinfield-Daniell 3rd Baronet of Dukinfield and Lieut-Gen Henry Daniell de Grangues.

The senior-most branch of the family ceased in 1726 following the death of Colonel Sir Samuel and Lady Daniell without issue as well as the ownership of the D'Anyers' Cheshire estates. Sir Samuel's uncles John and William however both produced issue, descendants of which remain today, the latter through matrilineal descent.

Descendants of the family were still active in public, municipal and military affairs during the 20th century.

The Daniell (D'Anyers) coat of arms is recorded in the 1613 Cheshire visitations as quarterly of four- argent, a pale lozengy sable (D'Anyers) and argent, a panther statant and regardant sable (De Tabley) with a crest of a unicorn's head couped or, crined argent

== 11th Century origins ==
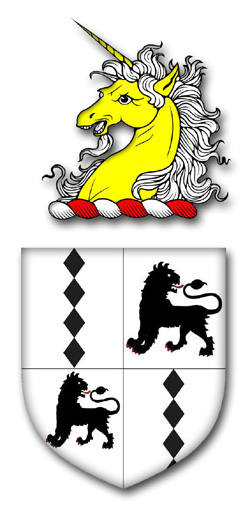
Coat of arms recorded in the Cheshire Visitations (c.1613)

The D'Anyers family can be traced back to Le Signeur D'Anyers, also known as 'Denyas' who accompanied William the Conqueror to England in 1066, and fought in the Battle of Hastings alongside Errand de Harcourt. The name can be found inscribed on the Roll of Battle Abbey

Following the Norman Conquest, Denyas settled in Cheshire in Chester alongside Hugh d'Avranches, Earl of Chester in the late 11th Century.

The progenitor of the family descended from Denyas can be traced to William De Anyers (the former's great great grandson) who married Agnes de Legh in 1270, and in 1291 purchased Daresbury from William le Norreys.

He had two sons both founders of respective branches, Thomas De Anyers who purchased the Bradley estate in 1301 from Peter Dutton, Lord of Warburton and William D'Anyers who inherited his father's lands and whose son Sir John De Anyers was Knight of Daresbury.

Owing to the destruction of deeds during the reign of Charles I, the family can only be traced with accuracy from the year 1250 however according to the book The 'Biographical history of the family of Daniell or De'Anyers of Cheshire published in 1876, evidence of the family in France before the Norman Conquest can be found in Bayeux.

Based on research by The Duchess of Cleveland in her work The Battle Abbey Roll with some Account of the Norman Lineages published in 1889 translating a significant portion of the Battle Abbey Roll, further evidence can be found attributing the D'Anyers family origins in Asnieres-en-Bessin in North-Western France.

== Sir Thomas D'Anyers and The Battle of Crécy ==
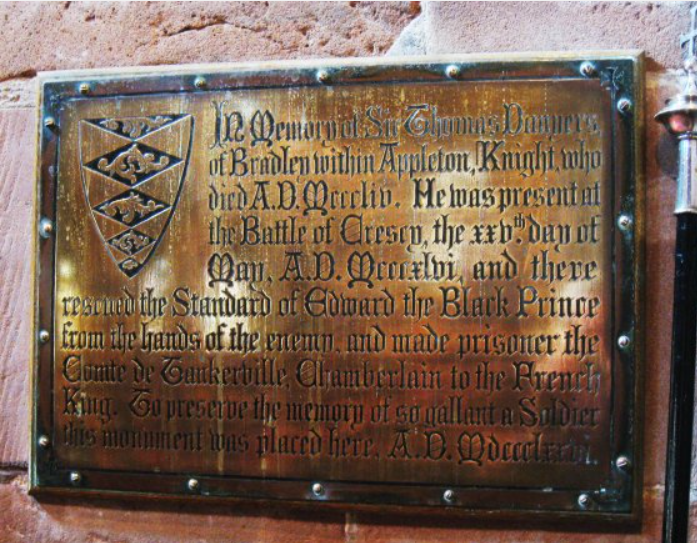
Memorial to Sir Thomas D'Anyers. St Wilfrid's Church

Thomas D'Anyers of Bradley, the eldest son of William D'Anyers, served as Sherriff of Cheshire in 1350 and from his first marriage to Margaret de Tabley, was father to Sir Thomas D'Anyers (d.1354).

Sir Thomas D'Anyers is noted the most recognised member of the family gaining fame at the Battle of Crécy on the 26th August 1346 following his retrieval of the Black Prince's standard and capturing of the Chamberlain of France, the Comte de Tankerville.

For his actions, the Black Prince knighted him on the battlefield and settled upon him estates and an annuity of forty marks a year from the Earldom of Chester. Sir Thomas married Isabel de Bagguilly, an heiress in her own right and died during the lifetime of his father leaving a daughter Margaret.

Sir Thomas' daughter Margaret, Lady Savage later Lady Legh née D'Anyers was the sole heiress of her mother's lands at Lyme Handley and eventually also successfully claimed a portion of her father's lands totalling 1,400 acres from Richard II in 1398. She married Sir Piers Legh in 1388, their descendants the Barons of Newton held the estate Lyme Park until 1946.

Her father's other lands were settled on the heirs male of the D'Anyers family, with his half-brother from his father's second marriage also called Sir Thomas D'Anyers receiving the entirety of the D'Anyers' Cheshire estates from his brother and father. The latter Sir Thomas D'Anyers was also described as warrior of note and served alongside Sir Hugh Calvely

Sir Thomas D'Anyers of Crécy fame is memorialised in St Wilfrid's Church, Grappenhall, the village of which his elder brother Sir John D'Anyers was knight.

Sir Thomas' half-brother Sir Thomas D'Anyers married an heiress, Margaret De Tabley and at the time of their marriage received a third of Tabley, at her father's decease he inherited the remainder which were amalgamated into the D'Anyers estates. Their son Thomas D'Anyers of Over Tabley married Elizabeth Aston, née Boydell widow of his cousin Thomas Boydell heir to Sir John D'Anyers' lands in Grappenhall.

== 15th to the 17th century ==
The family continued in service to the crown as knights, operating as landowners from Cheshire and through subsequent marriages were able to acquire further land in Warrington, Nether Tabley, and Cherry Tree Hurst during the 15th century.

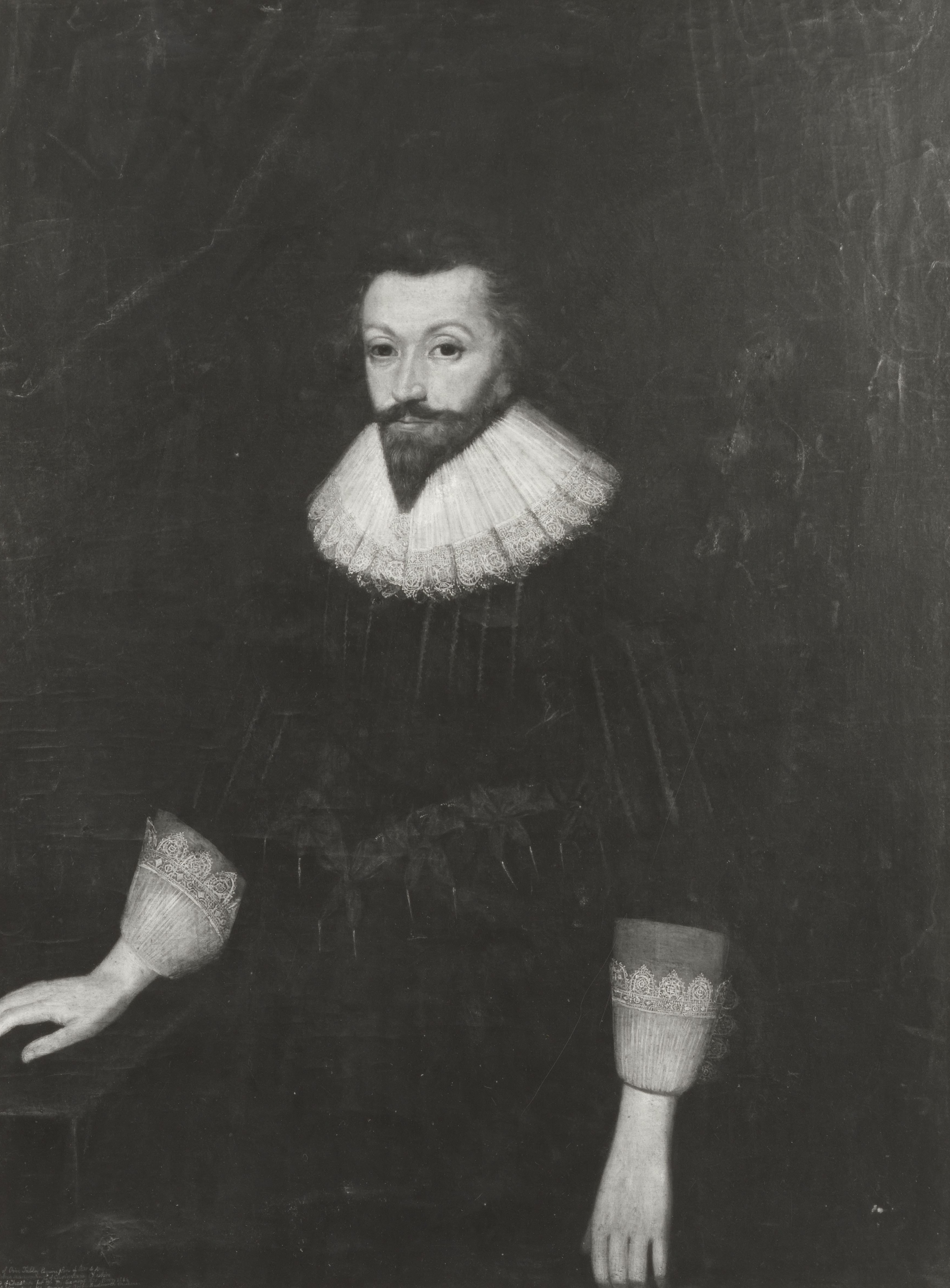
Sir Peter Daniell MP of Over Tabley (1584-1652) by Van Dyck

An inheritance dispute occurred in 1493 between the D'Anyers of Over Tabley and Daniells of Lymme, following the death of an uncle Thomas Daniell of Cherry Tree Hurst without a legitimate heir in 1493.

Thomas D'Anyers (x3 great grandson of Thomas D'Anyers and Elizabeth) at the time of his uncle's death claimed the land which was challenged by a cousin William Daniell of Longdon who claimed that Thomas Daniell had made him heir. The dispute was settled some 30 years later in 1523 ruling in the D'Anyers favour with William Daniell conveying all rights to the land to Thomas' grandson, Thomas D'Anyers of Over Tabley.

His grandson and heir Piers D'Anyers Esquire (also spelt as Daniell), was under the guardianship of Sir Peter Newton, secretary to Arthur, Prince of Wales and was succeeded by his son Thomas who married Margaret Wilbraham, acquiring land in Woodhey.

Thomas was eventually succeeded by his grandson Sir Peter Daniell MP of Over Tabley Hall who inherited his father's Cheshire estates aged 6 in 1560. He married Christian Grosvenor, the sister of Sir Richard Grosvenor (ancestor to the Dukes of Westminster) in 1620, and was a politician who sat in the House of Commons as MP for Cheshire in 1626 and a member of the 'Baronet Group'- although not a Baronet himself. He suffered considerable debts during his lifetime and died in Great Budworth in 1652, his wife survived him by over a decade and died in 1663.

They had five sons: Peter, John, Henry, William and Thomas as well as several daughters who married into notable families.

Both Thomas and Peter were Royalist officers, Thomas was killed at the Battle of Brentford in 1642 and Peter in Oxford after being shot at the Siege of Gloucester in 1643. Henry was also killed during the Battle of Brentford in 1642 however evidence suggests that he likely fought on the Parliamentarian side. Both John and William survived the Civil War and were supporters of Oliver Cromwell.

John served as Auditor General of the forces in the West Indies expedition, during the Anglo-Spanish War, his letters of which survive today, and worked as a spy for John Thurloe.

William Daniell (also D'Anyers) served as a Colonel in the Parliamentarian forces and was active in the invasion of Scotland and later appointed commander in Northern Scotland by the 1st Duke of Albermarle.

== 18th century ==
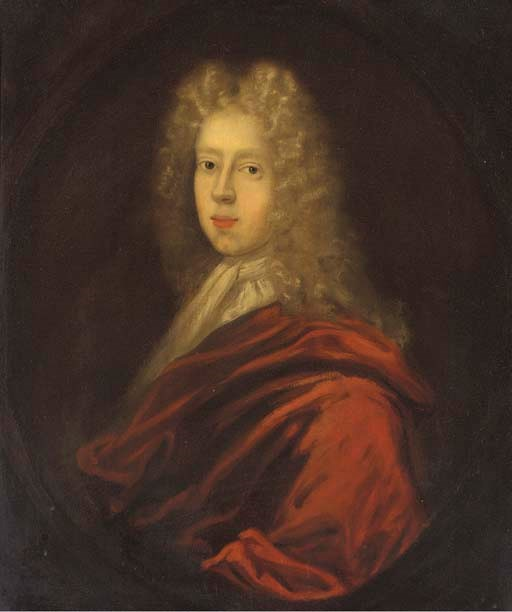
Sir William Dukinfield-Daniell, 3rd Baronet of Dukinfield (c.1745)

Sir Peter was succeeded in his estates by his grandson Thomas from his eldest son Captain Peter Daniell, who died following the Siege of Gloucester. His grandson Colonel Sir Samuel Daniell inherited Over Tabley and the D'Anyers Cheshire estates.

Sir Samuel served as a Colonel in the army of William of Orange and was knighted by him for his extensive military service. Sir Samuel married first Anne Tatton, Lady Meredith widow of Sir Amos Meredith and secondly Frances Dormer a first cousin of Robert Dormer, 1st Earl of Carnarvon. From his second marriage, Sir Samuel had one daughter Anne, who died in infancy.

Sir Samuel's will dated February 19 1723 leaves his Cheshire estates and Over Tabley Hall to his great-nephew Samuel Duckinfield the son of his niece Lady Dukinfield-Daniell who married Sir Charles Dukinfield-Daniell, 2nd Baronet. The Dukinfield's took the name of Daniell and arms of D'Anyers following Sir Samuel's death in 1726, their son Sir William Dukinfield-Daniell, 3rd Baronet married Penelope Vernon.

The Duchess of Cleveland in her work The Battle Abbey Roll with some Account of the Norman Lineages said the following:

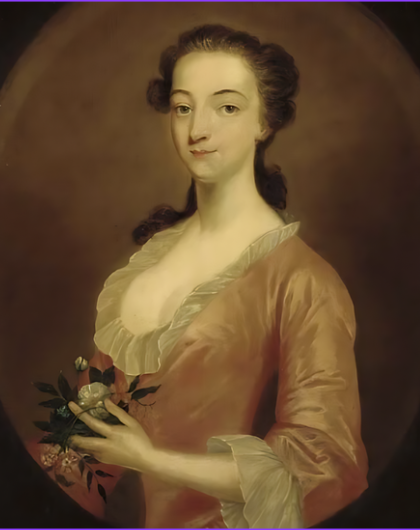
Penelope, Lady Dukinfield-Daniell (c.1745)

"Thirteen generations had dwelt, in prosperous and uninterrupted (though seemingly uneventful) succession at Over-Tabley, when, early in the last Century, Samuel Daniell found himself the last of his house.

His two brothers had died s. p., and he had lost his only child—a daughter—in her infancy.

At his death in 1726, his Cheshire estates were demised by will to his great-nephew Samuel Duckenfield"

Following the death of Sir William in 1758 ending the D'Anyers ownership of their Cheshire estates spanning over 450 years, Penelope, Lady Dukinfield-Daniell, became the sole heiress of the Dukinfield-Daniell estates. She died in 1762 with the entirety of the estates left to Lady Dukinfield-Daniell's second husband John 'Beau' Astley.

Astley extensively remodelled Over Tabley Hall, and built a Strawberry Hill style Neo-Gothic façade over the existing building. The estate was eventually broken up and sold by his descendants to the Leicesters of Tabley House and tenant farmers.

== 19th to the 21st century ==
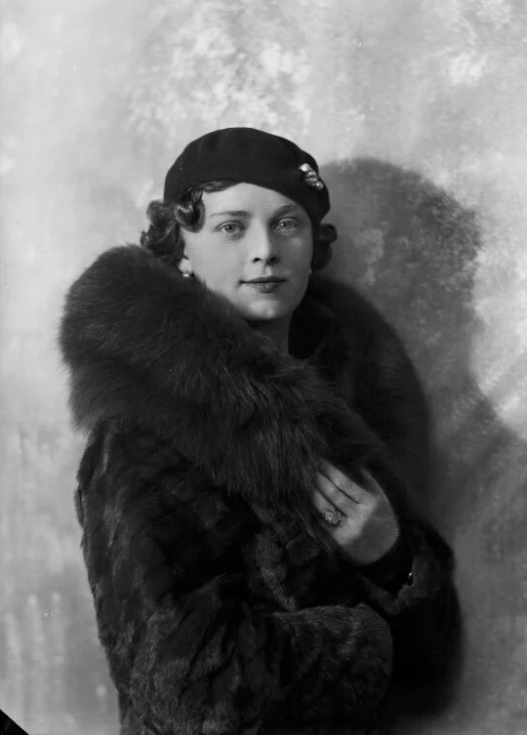
Winifred D'Anyers (Willis), Countess de Salis, by Bassano (1935)

Following Sir Samuel's death ending the senior male line descending from Sir Peter Daniell in 1726, the name was succeeded by descendants of his two younger sons John and Colonel William, the latter through matrilineal descent.

Colonel William D'Anyers was succeeded in his estates by his daughters who married into the Willis family of Lancashire and Finch family, descendants of which continued the name of D'Anyers and remain today marrying into the Skeffington family and Salis-Soglio family, the Counts de Salis.

John married and had a son, Thomas, whose descendants moved to the South West of England, founding a successful shipping company in the late 1700s which remained active until the early 1900s. At its height, it operated a large commercial banking arm.

In 1900 it was valued at £1m, approximately £102m as of 2023.

By 1920, remaining assets from the shipping and banking firm were sold, following this the family had significant interests in rail, brewing, and real estate investment and held landed estates in Devon and Somerset.

Members married into several noble families including the Carew baronets and Harvey baronets the latter of which had made a fortune in textile during the early 18th century.

Descendants of both Colonel William and John served with distinction during the Anglo-Boer Wars, World War 1 and World War 2 and were active and donors in the equestrian and horticultural communities.

== Present day ==
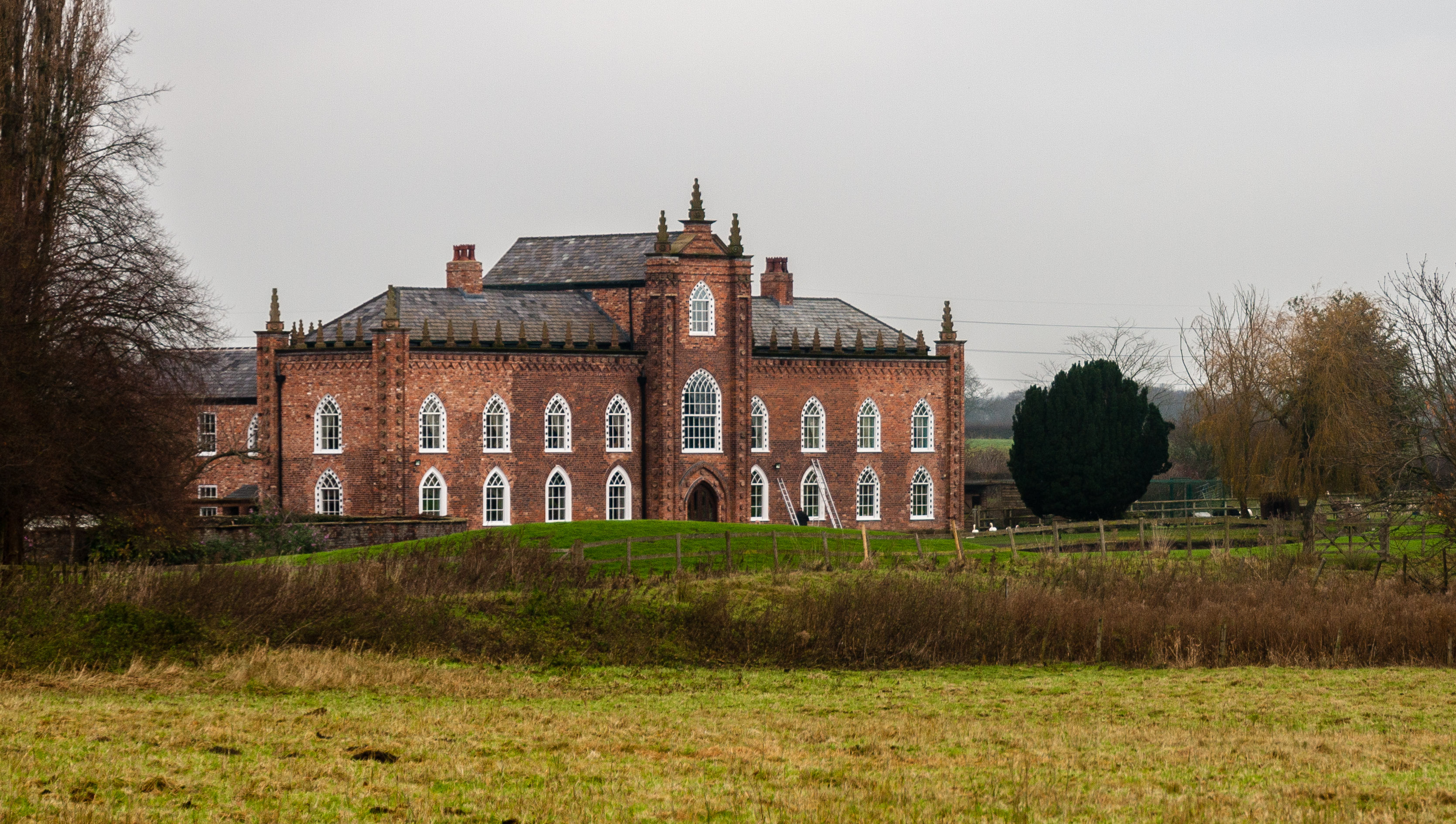
Over Tabley Hall (2014)

Descendants of the family are still active today with their rich history preserved in historical records, archives, and memorials throughout Cheshire and the South West.

The family's former seat at Over Tabley Hall is recorded in the National Heritage List for England as a designated Grade II listed building and parts of the 17th-century stable block remain.

The house underwent renovations from 2007-2017.

The east end of the south aisle of All Saints' Church, Daresbury houses the D'Anyers 'Daniell Chapel', formerly the Chadwick Chapel, which was renamed in commemoration of one of Cheshire's oldest families, the east window of the chapel features characters from Alice's Adventures in Wonderland, erected in 1935.

.As commented by The Duchess of Cleveland:

"Here again, therefore, we may welcome among us one of the rare old names that have never died out."
