= Danelo =

Danelo is a surname. Notable people with the surname include:

- David J. Danelo, American author and lecturer
- Joe Danelo (born 1953), American football player
- Mario Danelo (1985–2007), American football player, son of Joe

== See also ==
- Danell
- Danilo
