= Edward Daniell =

Edward Daniell may refer to:

- Edward Daniell (cricketer) (1815–1875), English cricketer
- Edward Thomas Daniell (1804–1842), English landscape painter and etcher
