= St Paul's Church, Over Tabley =

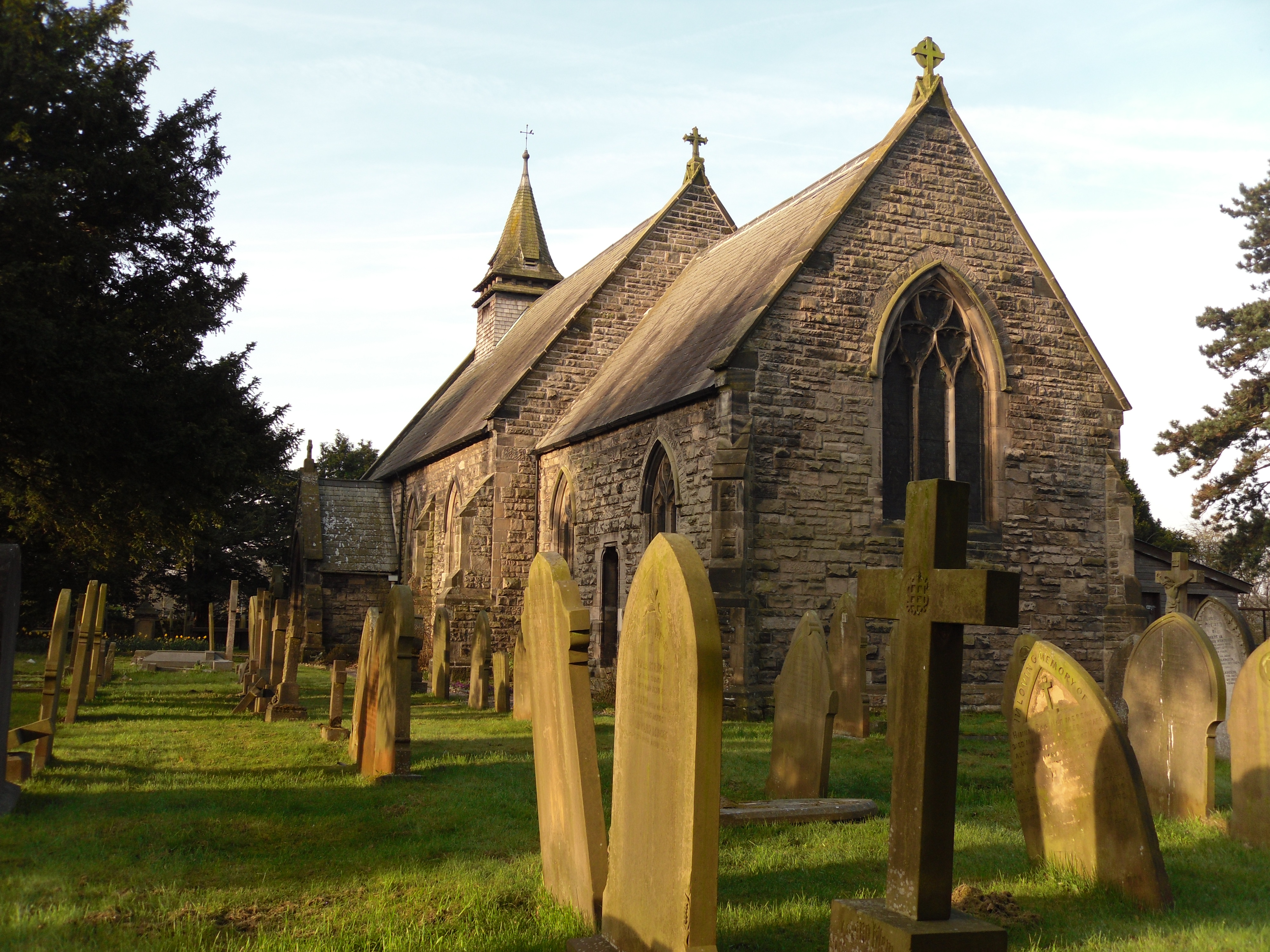
- St Paul's Church, Over Tabley, from the southeast

- Location in Cheshire
- 53.3162°N 2.4169°W
- OS grid reference: SJ723800
- Location: Tabley Superior, Cheshire
- Country: England
- Denomination: Anglican
- Website: St Paul's, Over Tabley

History
- Status: Parish church
- Dedication: Saint Paul

Architecture
- Functional status: Active
- Heritage designation: Grade II
- Designated: 26 February 2009
- Architect: Anthony Salvin
- Architectural type: Church
- Style: Gothic Revival
- Groundbreaking: 1853
- Completed: 1855

Administration
- Province: York
- Diocese: Chester
- Archdeaconry: Macclesfield
- Deanery: Knutsford
- Parish: Over Tabley

Clergy
- Vicar: Revd Jennifer Sara Croft

St Paul's Church, is in Tabley Superior, Cheshire, England. It stands beside the B5569 which was formerly the A556 road between the M6 and the M56 but was bypassed by the new A556 road to the west in 2017. It is an active Anglican parish church in the deanery of Knutsford, the archdeaconry of Macclesfield, and the diocese of Chester. The church is recorded in the National Heritage List for England as a designated Grade II listed building.

== History ==
St Paul's was built between 1853 and 1855 for Revd Joseph Horder at a cost of £1,316 (equivalent to £120,000 in 2025). It was designed by Anthony Salvin. The land was given by the Langford-Brooke family of nearby Mere Hall, and the foundation stone was laid by Thomas William Langford-Brooke. The completed church was consecrated on 18 March 1855, but later that year it was severely damaged by a fire. It was restored, following Salvin's plans, and re-opened in 1856.

== Architecture and furnishings ==
=== Exterior ===
The church is constructed in sandstone, with slate roofs. Its architectural style is Early English. The plan consists of a three-bay nave, a north aisle, a two-bay chancel at a lower level, and a north vestry. At the west end is a square bellcote with shingle side and a hexagonal roof. On the gables are cross finials of differing designs.

=== Interior ===
The interior walls of the church are plastered. Inside the church is an elaborate rood screen carved by F. H. Crossley in 1908; it is thought that more of the carvings in the church were executed by him. These include those on the chancel roof including depictions of badgers (representing the Langford-Brooke family) and swans (representing Over Tabley). The stained glass in the east window and the south windows in the chancel is in memory of Thomas William Langford-Brooke. They were designed by Henry James Salisbury and date from about 1884. The west window is in memory of Henry Langford-Brooke and depicts Saint Peter and Saint Paul. In the nave are two windows by Christopher Whall dating from about 1900. The original organ had been built in 1855 by Kirtland and Jardine, but it was replaced by an electronic organ in 1957.

== External features ==
In the churchyard is a monument that is included in the listing. It is the sandstone chest tomb of Henry Langford-Brooke, carved by Macdonald and Eric Gill in about 1909. It includes the representation of a stylised tree, and text in Gill Sans lettering.

== See also ==
- Listed buildings in Tabley Superior
- List of new churches by Anthony Salvin
