= Over Tabley Hall =

Country house in Cheshire, England

Coordinates: 53.31553°N 2.42272°W

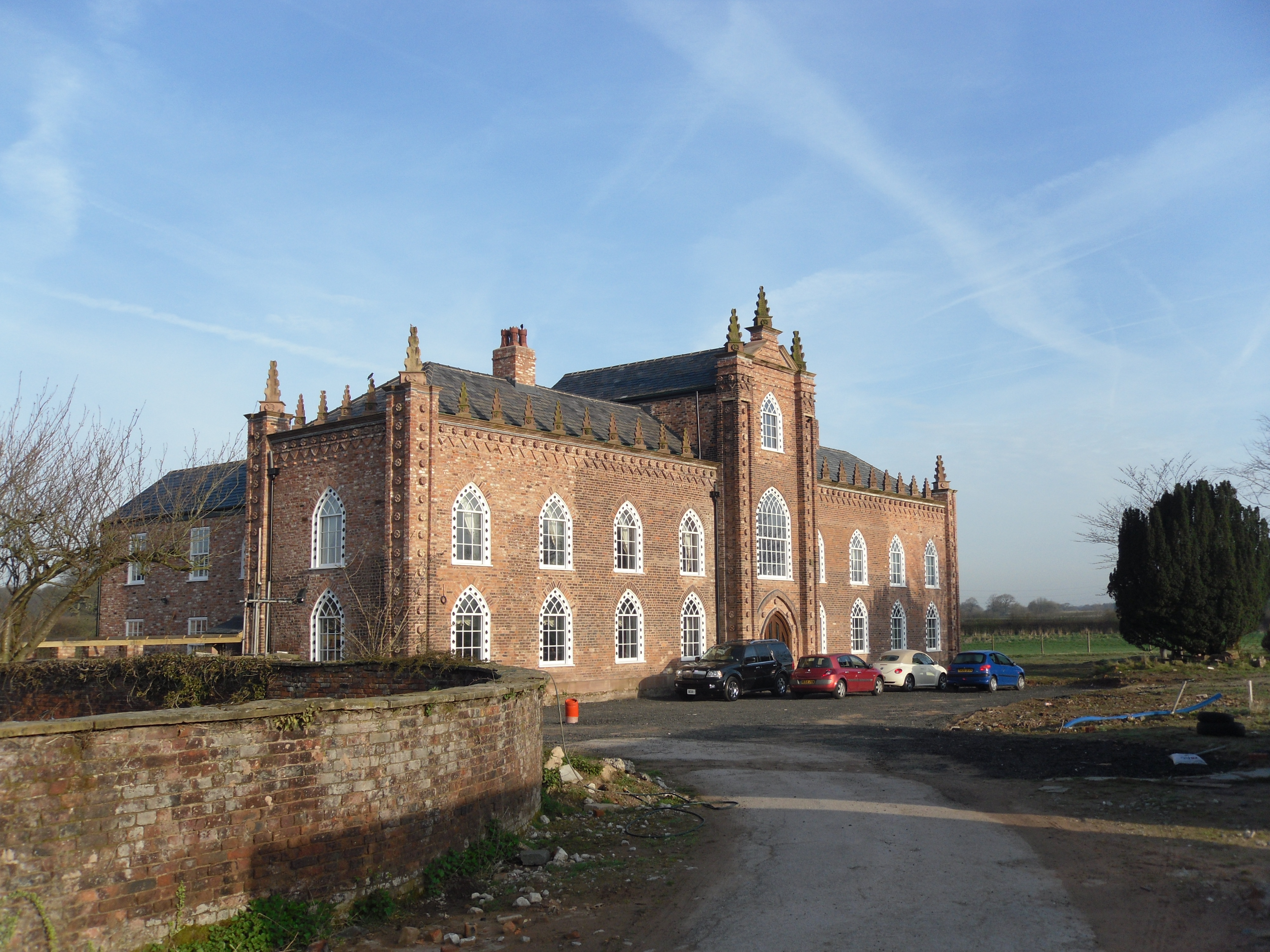
Over Tabley Hall

Over Tabley Hall is a country house in the parish of Tabley Superior in Cheshire, England. It stands in an isolated position to the northwest of junction 19 of the M6 motorway.

== History ==
The house was built for the D'Anyers (alias Daniell) family over a now demolished existing property held by the family since the 14th century. It was remodelled before 1771 by the painter and amateur architect John Astley, producing a "Georgian Gothic façade with sashes and spiky pinnacles stuck on to a plain earlier house". following patronage from his wealthy wife, heiress Penelope, Lady Dukinfield-Daniell widow of Sir Thomas Dukinfield-Daniell

== Architecture ==
Over Tabley Hall is constructed in red brick with stone dressings and a slate roof. It has two storeys and a symmetrical main front of nine bays. The central bay protrudes forwards and extends upwards to form a three-storey tower. At the sides of the central bay are pilasters with sunken panels containing round flower decorations. At the top of the bay is an entablature with a frieze containing similar decorations. Above this is a stone gable, with crocketed pinnacles at its apex and at the top of the pilasters. In the bottom storey is a doorway with a pointed arch, and more flower decorations. Above this is a large sash window with a pointed arch, and in the top storey is a similar, but smaller, sash window. All of the other bays contain sash windows under pointed arches, one in each storey. At the corners of the house are pilasters similar to those at the sides of the central bay, with similar decorations, but rising only through two storeys. On top of each of the pilasters is a crocketed pinnacle, and smaller, similar pinnacles run along the parapet at the top of the house. The sides of the house have one bay, with features similar to the bays of the front. The house is recorded in the National Heritage List for England as a designated Grade II listed building.

== Associated building ==
To the south of the hall is an outbuilding, probably former stables, dating from the 17th century. It is constructed in red brick with stone dressings and a tiled roof. It has two storeys plus and attic. This building is also listed at Grade II.

== See also ==
- Listed buildings in Tabley Superior
