= Kanell =

Kanell is a surname. Notable people with the surname include:

- Billie G. Kanell (1931–1951), American Korean War veteran
- Danny Kanell (born 1973), American sports broadcaster and football player
- Jenna Kanell (fl. 2010), American actress, director, writer and stunt performer

== See also ==
- Danell
