= Listed buildings in Tabley Superior =

Tabley Superior is a civil parish in Cheshire East, England. It contains nine buildings that are recorded in the National Heritage List for England as designated listed buildings, all of which are listed at Grade II. This grade is the lowest of the three gradings given to listed buildings and is applied to "buildings of national importance and special interest". The parish is rural, and contains the intersection of the M6 motorway and the A556 road. The listed buildings consist of farm houses and buildings, houses and cottages, a country house, two lodges, and a church.

Name and location	Photograph	Date	Notes
Moss Cottage; 53.30535°N 2.40844°W	—	Mid-17th century	A house partly timber-framed with brick infill, and partly in brick. It has a thatched roof. The house is in two storeys and has a two-bay front.
Farm building, Over Tabley Hall; 53.31536°N 2.42310°W	—	Late 17th century	The farm building is in brick on a stone plinth with stone dressings and has a tiled roof. It is in two storeys with an attic. The windows are mullioned and contain casements.
Over Tabley Hall; 53.31556°N 2.42270°W		c. 1770	The house was designed by John Astley for his own use. It is in brick with stone dressings and a slate roof. The house is in two storeys, and has a symmetrical front of nine bays, the central bay protruding and rising to a three-storey tower. Along the top of the house is a frieze and a row of crocketed pinnacles. The windows have arched heads, and contain sashes.
Peacock Lodge East; 53.30181°N 2.41157°W	—	c. 1770	One of a pair of lodges at the northern entrance to Tabley House, probably designed by John Carr. It is in built in brick on a stone plinth, it has a slate pyramidal roof, and is in a single storey. On the drive front is a door with a stone Doric entablature, and on the road and rear fronts are sash windows each with a similar entablature. Railings lead to a square gate pier with a moulded pyramidal cap on which is a decorative wrought iron lamp bracket.
Peacock Lodge West; 53.30179°N 2.41177°W		c. 1770	One of a pair of lodges at the northern entrance to Tabley House, probably designed by John Carr. It is in built in brick on a stone plinth, it has a slate pyramidal roof, and is in a single storey. On the drive front is a door with a stone Doric entablature, and on the road and rear fronts are sash windows each with a similar entablature. Railings lead to a square gate pier with a moulded pyramidal cap on which is a decorative wrought iron lamp bracket.
Hollow Wood Farmhouse; 53.31956°N 2.43883°W	—	c. 1790	A brick farmhouse with a slate roof. It has a T-shaped plan, is in three storeys, and has a symmetrical three-bay front. In the centre is a doorway with a staircase window above. The other windows are casements. To the rear is a central wing.
Brook Cottage; 53.30694°N 2.43581°W		Late 18th to early 19th century	A brick house with a thatched roof. It is in two storeys, and has a two-bay front. On the front is a door to the right and two two-light casement windows in each floor. On the right side is a 19th-century outshut.
Hollybush Farm; 53.30993°N 2.42098°W	—	Early 19th century	A brick farmhouse with a slate roof. It is in two storeys with an attic, and has a three-bay front. The windows are a mix of sashes, some of which are horizontally-sliding, and casements.
St Paul's Church; 53.31620°N 2.41686°W		1853–55	The church was designed by Anthony Salvin in Early English style, and was built between 1853 and 1855. It is constructed in sandstone with slate roofs. The church consists of a nave, a north aisle, a chancel, and a north vestry. On the west gable is a bellcote. The church contains a carved timber rood screen by F. H. Crossley. In the churchyard is a monument to Henry Langford-Brooke, carved by Macdonald and Eric Gill; this is included in the listing.
