= Richard Woodman (disambiguation) =

Richard Woodman (1944–2024) was an English novelist and naval historian.

Richard Woodman may also refer to:

- Richard Woodman (martyr) (c. 1524–1557), Sussex martyr
- Richard Woodman (engraver) (1784–1859), English engraver and miniature portrait painter
- Richard Woodman (cricketer)
