= Peter Daniell =

English politician

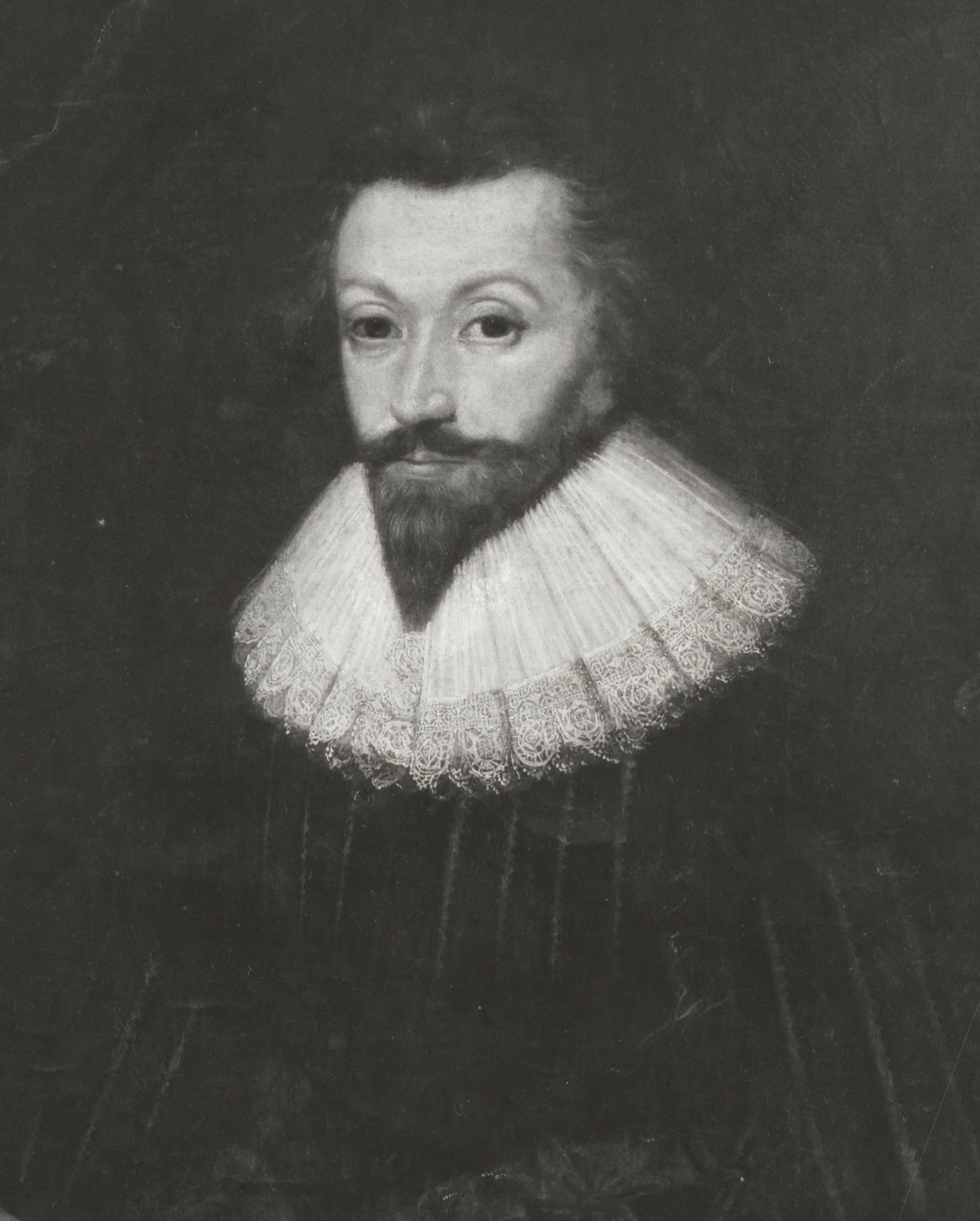
Peter Daniell by Van Dyck (c.1620)

Sir Peter Daniell MP, also Peter D'Anyers, (1584–1652) of Over Tabley Hall was an English politician who sat in the House of Commons in 1626 and member of the D'Anyers family.

== Early life and marriage ==
Born into the D'Anyers family of Cheshire, he was the eldest son of Captain Peter Daniell of Over Tabley and Anna daughter of Henry Mainwaring of Carincham, Cheshire.

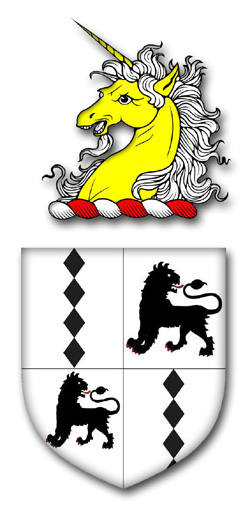
Coat of Arms for Peter Daniell (1613). Motto: Nec spe nec metu

He inherited his family estate Over Tabley Hall aged 6 following his father's death in 1590.

He matriculated at The Queen's College, Oxford on 16 October 1601, aged 17 and was a student of Gray's Inn in 1604 and in 1626 was elected Member of Parliament for Cheshire. Daniell's brother Richard matriculated The Queen's College a year after him in 1602. Their father Captain Peter Daniell (alias D'Anyers) had matriculated University College, Oxford in 1576.

In 1620 he married Christian Grosvenor, sister of Sir Richard Grosvenor of Eaton Hall whose great-great-grandson was created 1st Earl Grosvenor, ancestor to the Dukes of Westminster.

Other descendants of Sir Richard include Prince George of Teck, 2nd Marquess of Cambridge, Charles Innes-Ker, 11th Duke of Roxburghe, Thomas Anson, 6th Earl of Lichfield, and William Lygon, 8th Earl Beauchamp

Daniell resided at Over Tabley Hall, an estate which had been the family's seat since the mid 14th century.

Daniell's elder son and heir Captain Peter D'Anyers died in Oxford following a shot received at the Siege of Gloucester in 1643 and left issue, another son Thomas was killed at the Battle of Brentford a year prior.

Another son John served as an auditor of the forces in the 1655 West Indies expedition, and was later a Parliamentarian spy for John Thurloe. Another son William was an important Colonel in the Parliamentarian forces throughout the Civil War, holding various posts including acting Governor of Chester Castle in 1648. Colonel William D'Anyers regiment also joined Cromwell's army in the invasion of Scotland and fought at Dunbar, he played an important role in General Lambert's victory at Inverkeithing. For much of the 1650s his regiment was stationed at Perth, and in June 1657 the 1st Duke of Albermarle appointed him as commander in Northern Scotland.

Daniell suffered from significant debts during his lifetime and died at Great Budworth, in Cheshire, on 18 April 1652.

His descendant William (D'Anyers) Daniell sat in parliament as Member of Youth Parliament for the UK Youth Parliament representing North Devon, West Devon, and Torridge from 2022-24.

Parliament of England
Preceded by Sir Robert Cholmondeley, Bt; Sir Anthony St John	Member of Parliament for Cheshire; 1626; With: Sir Richard Grosvenor, 1st Baronet	Succeeded by Sir Richard Grosvenor, 1st Baronet; Sir William Brereton, 1st Baronet
