= Danella =

Danella is both a surname and a given name. Notable people with the name include:

- Utta Danella (1920–2015), German writer
- Danella Butrus (born 2007), Iraqi Australian soccer player
- Danella Lucioni (born 1984), Italian model

== See also ==
- Danell
