= Lake Daniell =

Lake in New Zealand

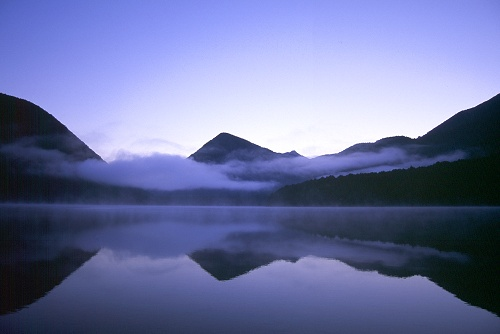

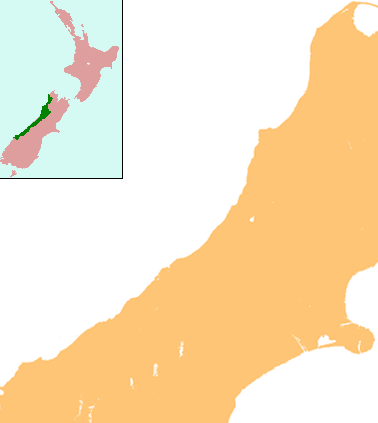
- Location within West Coast
- Location: West Coast, South Island, New Zealand
- Coordinates: 42.2976°S 172.2910°E
- Primary outflows: Frazer Stream
- Basin countries: New Zealand

Lake Daniell is a lake in the West Coast Region of the South Island of New Zealand. Until 2008 the lake was officially named as Lake Daniells.

It is drained by Frazer Stream which in turn feeds into the Alfred River and is surrounded by old growth beech forest. A tramping track leads to the lake and an adjacent hut, the Manson-Nicholls Memorial Hut.

In 2002 there was a search in the area for a missing tramper who was part of a group staying at the lake. The tramper, a 14-year-old male, was found dead next to the Alfred River.

== See also ==
- List of lakes in New Zealand
