= Christ and the Adulteress (Titian, Glasgow) =

Painting by Titian

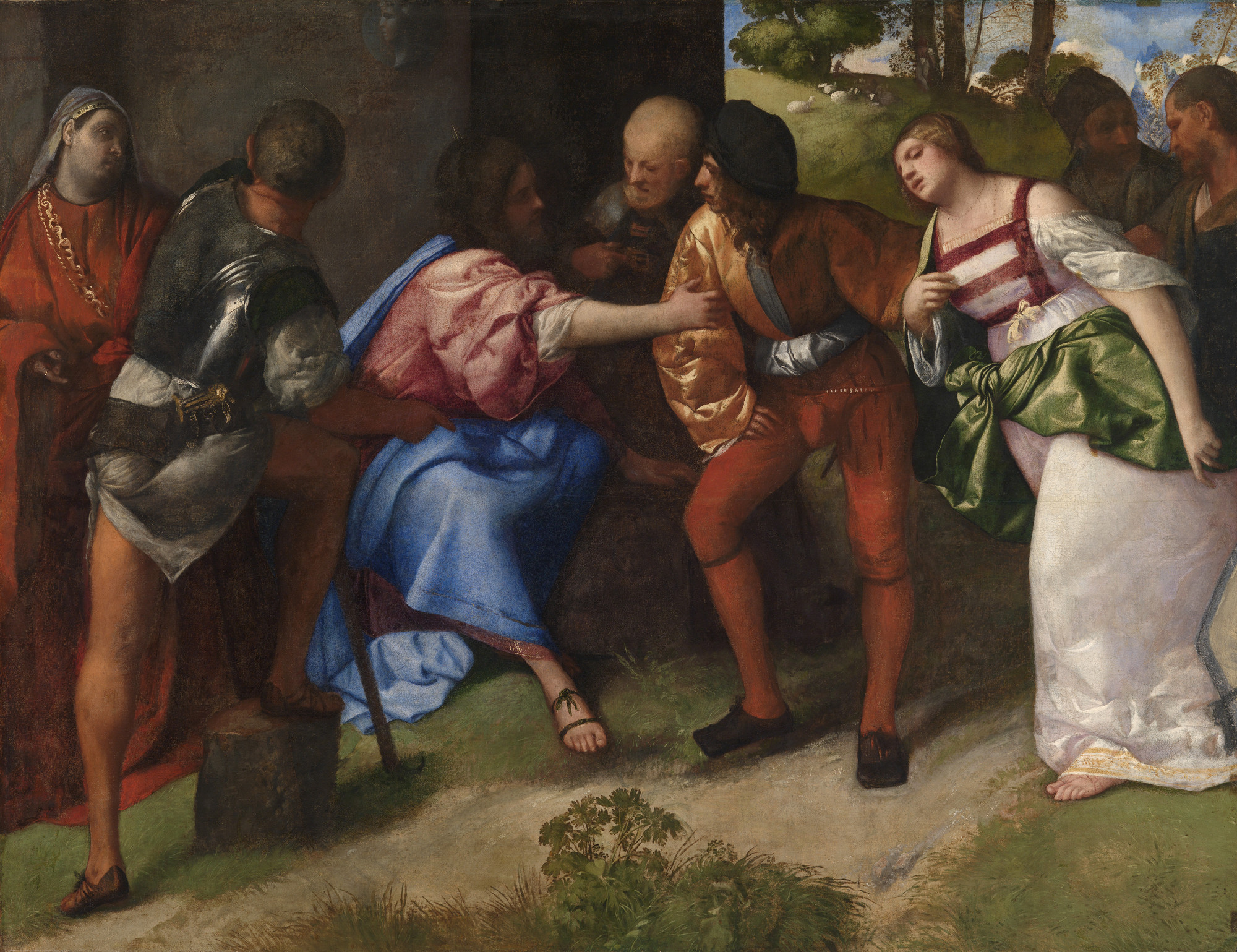
- Artist: Titian
- Year: c. 1508–1510
- Medium: Oil on canvas
- Dimensions: 139.3 cm × 181.7 cm (54.8 in × 71.5 in)
- Location: Kelvingrove Art Gallery and Museum; Glasgow
- Accession: 181

Christ and the Adulteress, also called Christ and the Woman Taken in Adultery, and The Adulteress Brought before Christ, is an oil painting usually attributed to Titian and painted early in his career, c. 1508-1510. It hangs in the Kelvingrove Art Gallery and Museum, in Glasgow.

== Attribution ==
The picture has been variously attributed to Bonifacio, Cariani, Romanino, Sebastiano del Piombo, Domenico Campagnola, Domenico Mancini, Giorgione, and Titian. The subject, too, has been contested; Johannes Wilde and others argued in favour of the Old Testament story of Susanna and Daniel. Most scholars now accept the subject of the painting as the New Testament story of Jesus and the woman taken in adultery, and attribute the painting to Titian.

== Sources ==
- Brown, Beverly Louise (2007). "Corroborative Detail: Titian’s "Christ and the Adulteress"". Artibus et Historiae, 28(56): pp. 73–105.
- "Christ and the Adulteress / Titian, The Adulteress Brought before Christ". Glasgow Museums Collections Online. Retrieved 4 March 2023.
- In the Age of Giorgione. Royal Academy of Arts, 2016. pp. 118–119.
