= Dukinfield baronets =

Extinct baronetcy in the Baronetage of England

Escutcheon of the Dukinfield baronets

The Baronetcy of Dukinfield of Dukinfield, Cheshire was created in the Baronetage of England on 16 June 1665 for Robert Dukinfield, son of Colonel Robert Dukinfield.

The Dukinfield family were seated at Dukinfield, Cheshire from the early 14th century. Dukinfield Hall was demolished in about 1950.

Colonel Robert Dukinfield served in the army of the Commonwealth of England during the English Civil War and was high sheriff of Cheshire in 1625 and 1648 and Governor of Chester in 1650. Despite his father's loyalties, his son Robert was raised to the Baronetcy following the English Restoration and served as High Sheriff of Cheshire in 1675. His son the 2nd Baronet married the niece of Sir Samuel Daniel who bequeathed his estate at Over Tabley, Cheshire to William, 3rd Baronet, who by Act of Parliament changed his name to Dukinfield-Daniel. On his death the 3rd Baronet left all his estates to his daughter, through whom they passed to John Astley (1724–1787). The Baronetcy passed to the 3rd Baronet's cousin, 4th Baronet, and later to his cousin, the 5th Baronet.

Latterley the seat of the Baronetcy was at Stanlake House, Berkshire. The Baronetcy was extinct on the demise of the 7th Baronet.

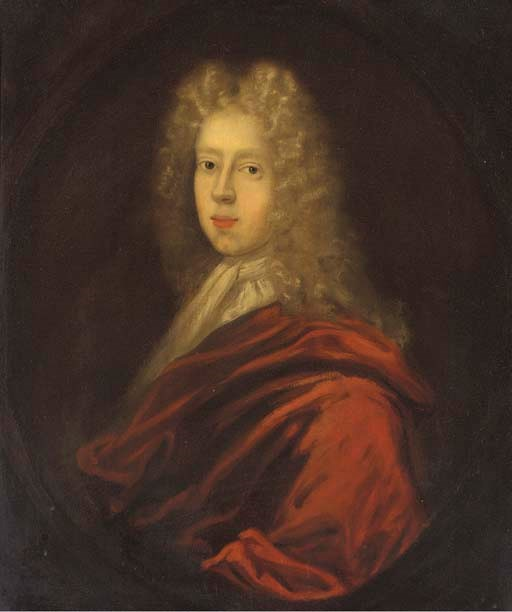
Portrait of Sir William Dukinfield-Daniell, 3rd Baronet of Dukinfield (1725–1758), circa 1745

== Dukinfield of Dukinfield (1665) ==
- Sir Robert Dukinfield, 1st Baronet (1642–1729)
- Sir Charles Dukinfield, 2nd Baronet (1670–1742)
- Sir William Dukinfield-Daniel, 3rd Baronet (1725–1758)
- Sir Samuel Dukinfield, 4th Baronet (1716–1768)
- Sir Nathaniel Dukinfield, 5th Baronet (1746–1824)
- Sir John Lloyd Dukinfield, 6th Baronet (1785–1836)
- The Reverend Sir Henry Robert Dukinfield, 7th Baronet (1791–1858) Extinct on his death

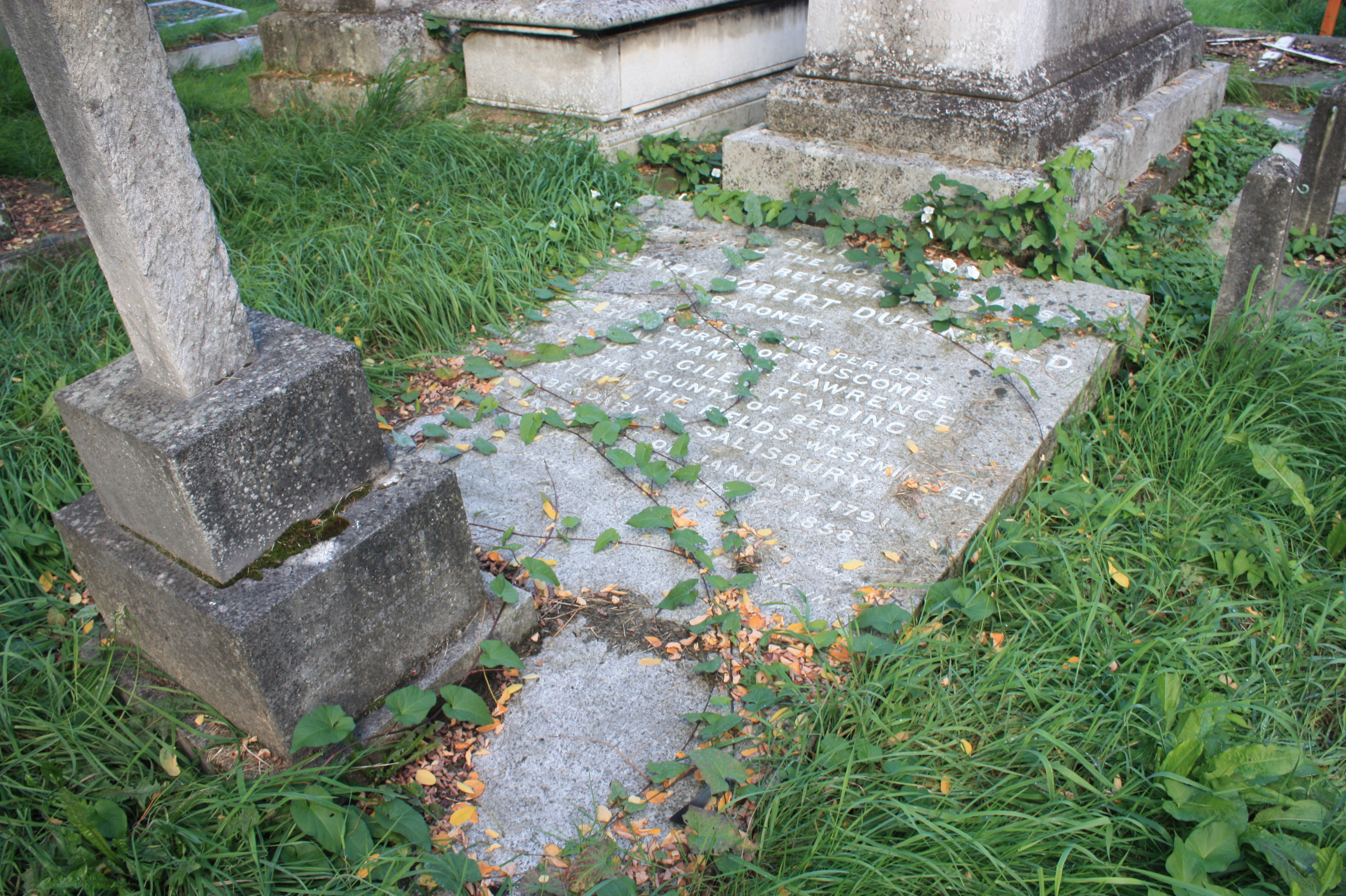
The grave of the Rev Sir Henry Robert Dukinfield, Kensal Green Cemetery
