= Schomberg House =

House in City of Westminster, London, England

Coordinates: 51°30′21″N 0°8′9″W

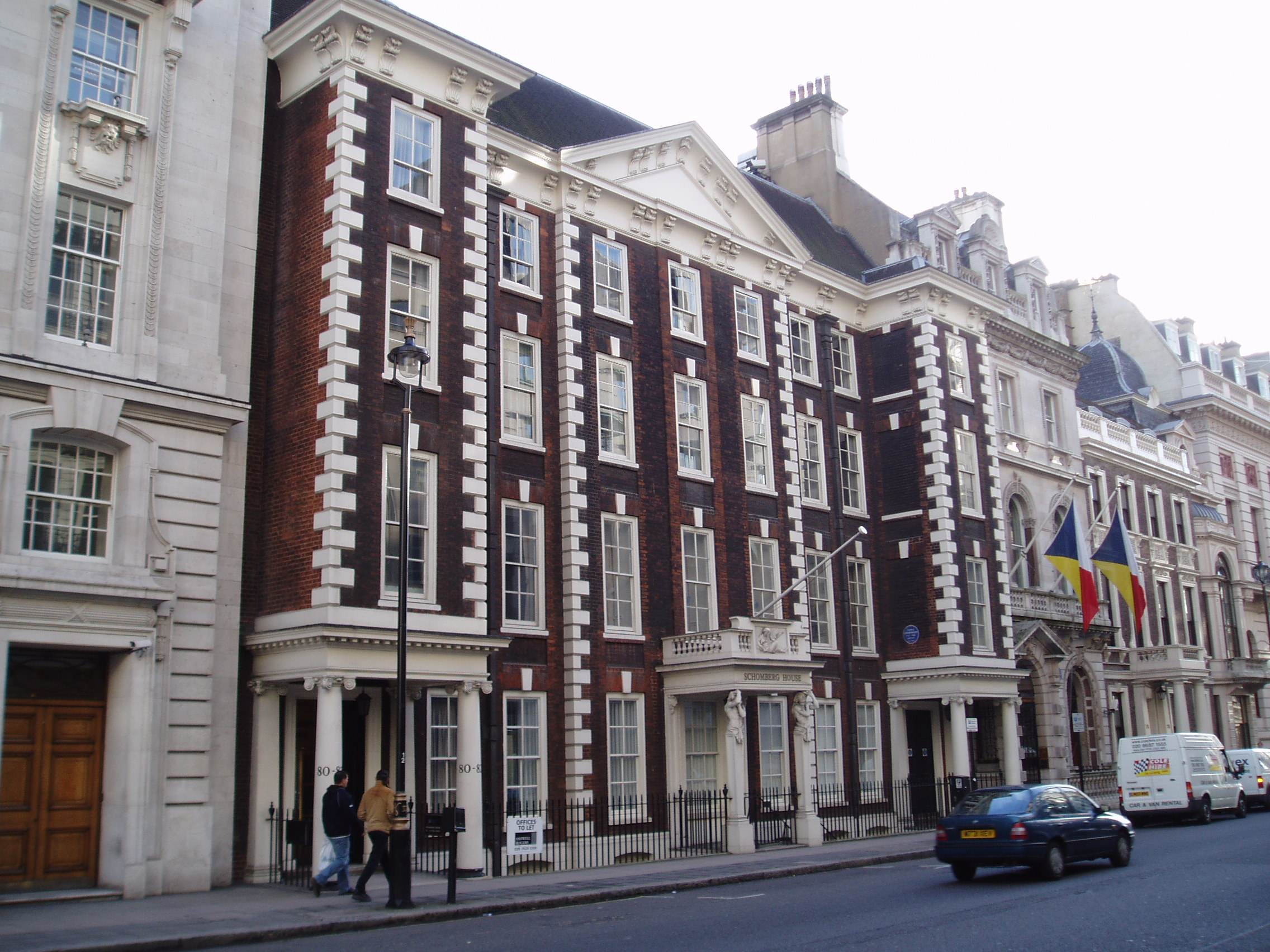
- Schomberg House in 2005
- Interactive map of the Schomberg House area

General information
- Location: London, United Kingdom

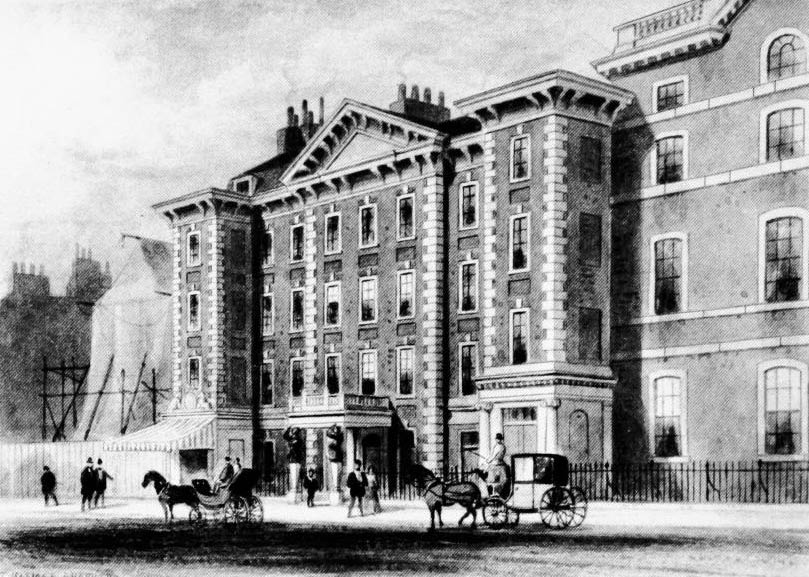
Schomberg House circa 1850

Schomberg House at 80–82 Pall Mall is a prominent house on the south side of Pall Mall in central London which has a colourful history. Only the street façade survives today.

== History ==
It was built for the 3rd Duke of Schomberg, a Huguenot general in the service of the British Crown. It was adapted from Portland House, which in turn had been created by the Countess of Portland by converting two houses into a single residence. Work began in 1694, the year after the duke inherited his title.

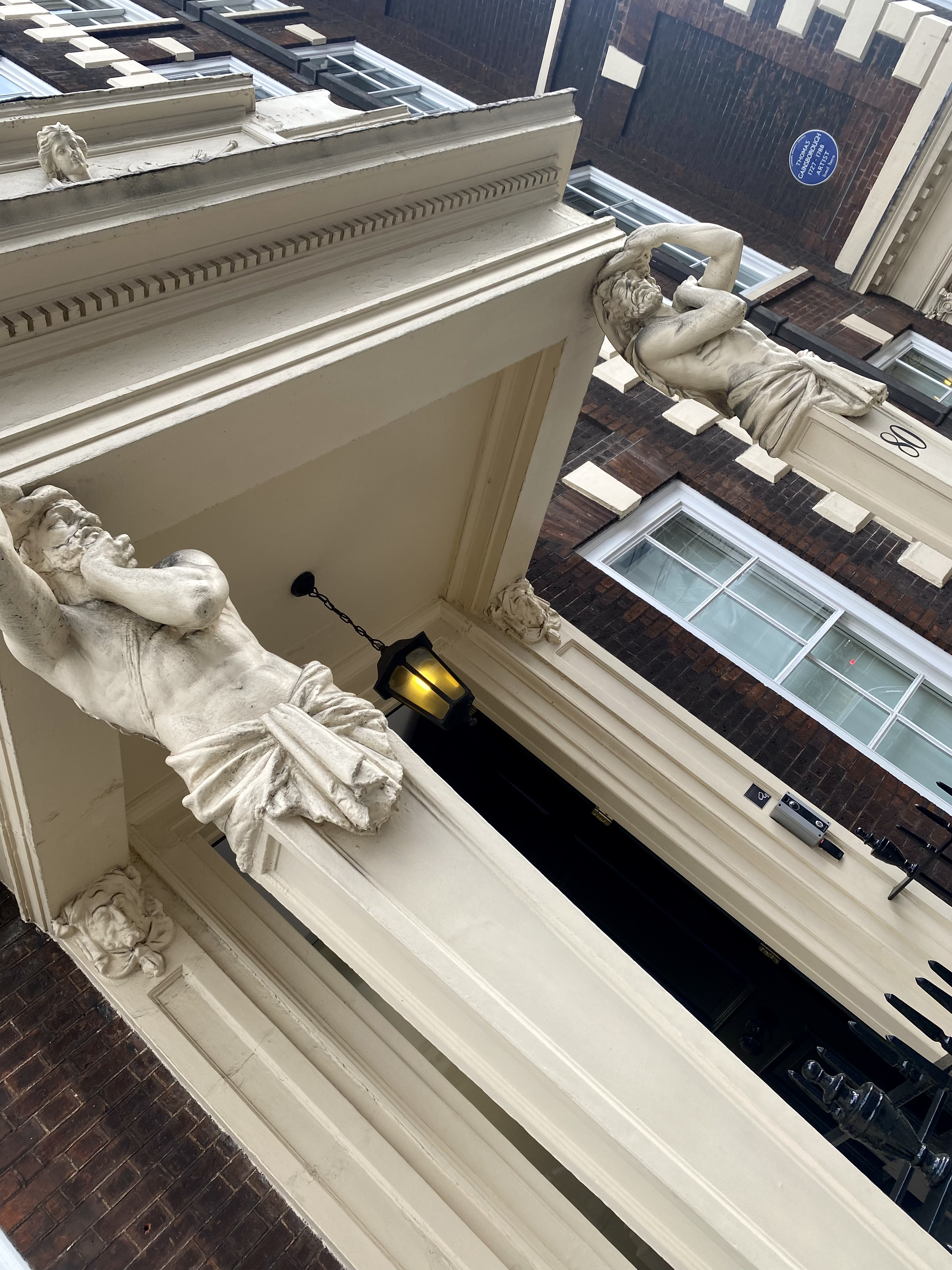
The atlantes at the entrance to Schomberg House

The street façade of Schomberg House is striking and rather unusual for a London mansion. It is of red brick, with four main storeys above the basement. The façade's street-level entrance porticoes and decorative work is made of Lithodipyra (Coade stone) manufactured by Eleanor Coade. It is nine windows wide, with the central three bays projecting slightly and topped by a pediment, and the two end bays projecting boldly so that they form projections somewhat like small towers. The windows are narrow and six bold bands of quoins frame the three projections.

Meinhardt Schomberg's dukedom became extinct on his death in 1719 and the house was subsequently let. In 1769 it was divided into three (80 Pall Mall to the west, 81 in the centre and 82 to the east) by the artist John Astley. Astley lived at no. 81 himself, and constructed a studio on the roof. In 1781 Astley was succeeded by a Scottish quack doctor called James Graham, who turned the establishment into a "Temple of Health and Hymen". The "Temple" featured a huge "celestial bed" fitted with early electrical devices.

Meanwhile, Thomas Gainsborough, who was at the height of his career as one of the two most fashionable portrait painters in England, lived next door at no. 80 from 1774 until his death in 1788. The artists Richard Cosway and Maria Cosway also lived at no. 81 for a time with their servant Ottobah Cugoano. During this period number 82 was a fashionable textile store.

In the first half of the nineteenth century Schomberg House was neither aristocratic nor artistic. The central house was a bookshop from 1804 to 1850, and other tenants of the three houses included a picture dealer, an auctioneer and a haberdasher. In 1850 no. 80 was demolished and replaced as part of an abortive redevelopment of the whole site. Then in 1859 nos. 80–82 were all acquired by the government for use by the War Office, which also occupied several other mansions in Pall Mall.

In 1956 the building was largely demolished to make way for offices. However, not only were the surviving façades of nos. 81 and 82 retained, but that of no. 80 was rebuilt in its original form.

Schomberg House is listed Grade II* on the National Heritage List for England.

== Namesake ==
The name Schomberg House has also been used for another property Pall Mall no. 78 (and 77) that used to be the residence of Princess Christian of Schleswig-Holstein and later her two daughters. No. 77 is now part of the Oxford and Cambridge Club (71 Pall Mall).

== See also ==
- List of demolished buildings and structures in London
