= Geoffrey Daniell =

16th-century English politician

Geoffrey Daniell (born by 1516 – 1558/1561) was an English politician. In 1545, he was the member of parliament for Devizes.

Daniell was the second son of Piers Daniell of Budworth, Cheshire, and Margaret, née Savage, a Cheshire heiress. He was a member of the Inner Temple. By 1537, he had married a widow, Margaret, of Chippenham, Wiltshire.

Daniell was surveyor to Anne of Cleves in 1540, and to Katherine Parr by 1545. He was justice of the peace for Wiltshire in 1543 and 1554. He was a steward for the uncle of King Edward VI, Thomas Seymour, Baron Seymour of Sudeley, who was executed for treason.

In March 1543, he is recorded as living at Marlborough, Wiltshire. Daniell probably had no surviving children – none were mentioned in any of the wills he made over the years. He died between 9 July 1558 and 4 February 1561.
