= Alfred River =

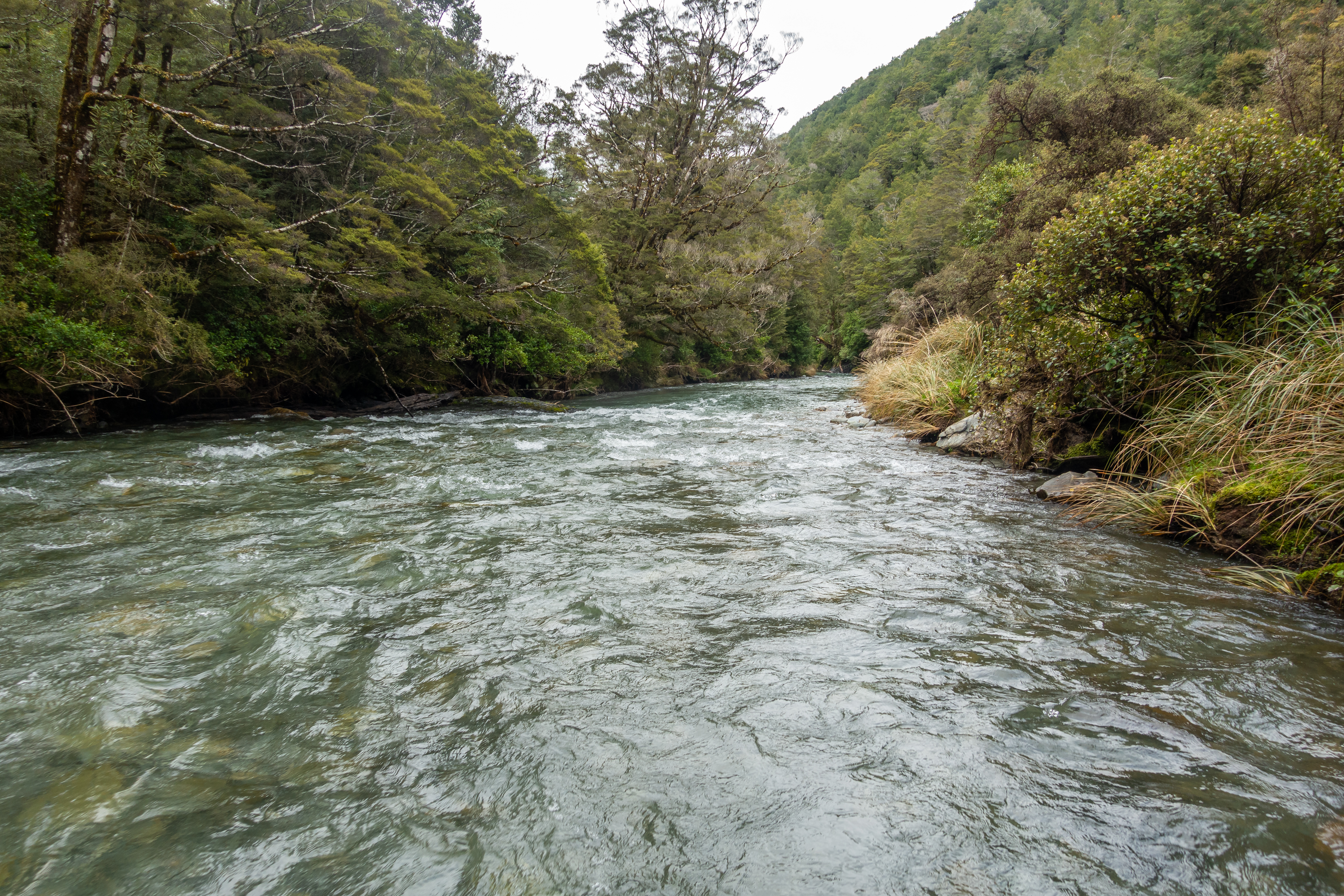
- View of the Alfred River
- Route of the Alfred River

Location
- Country: New Zealand

Physical characteristics
- Source
  - coordinates: 42°16′55″S 172°21′27″E
- Mouth
  - location: Maruia River
  - coordinates: 42°20′39″S 172°13′32″E

Basin features
- Progression: Alfred River → Maruia River → Buller River → Tasman Sea

The Alfred River is a river in New Zealand's Tasman region. It runs west-southwest from its source in the Spenser Mountains to its junction with the Maruia River. The schist in the river contains hornblende. The area has a temperate oceanic climate. Gold is said to have been found in the area.
