= David J. Danelo =

American author and lecturer

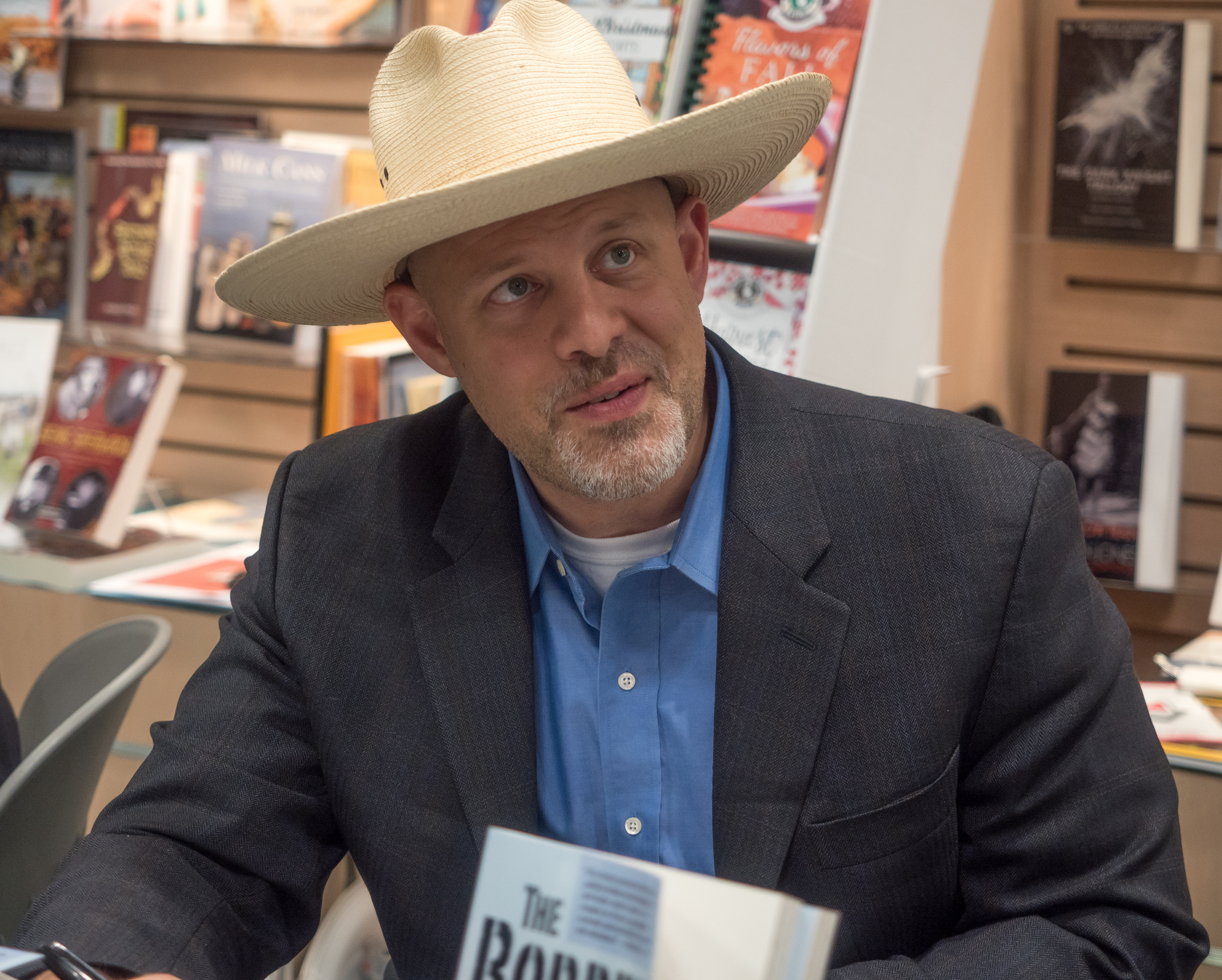
- David J. Danelo at BookExpo 2019
- Education: U.S. Naval Academy
- Occupations: Writer, Lecturer
- Military career
- Allegiance: United States
- Branch: United States Marine Corps
- Service years: 1998–2004
- Rank: Captain
- Unit: Infantry
- Conflicts: Iraq War (Deployment near Fallujah, 2004)
- Other work: Author, Lecturer, Border Policy Researcher
- Website: www.danelo.com

David J. Danelo is an American author and lecturer.

Danelo graduated from the U.S. Naval Academy in 1998 and served seven years as an infantry officer in the Marine Corps. In 2004, Captain Danelo served near Fallujah with the First Marine Expeditionary Force as a convoy commander, intelligence officer and provisional executive officer for a rifle company.

After leaving active duty, Danelo wrote four books, two of which received awards from the Military Writers Society of America.

From June 2011 to July 2012, Danelo served as executive director, Office of Policy and Planning, U.S. Customs and Border Protection.

== Books ==
- Blood Stripes: The Grunt's View of the War in Iraq (Stackpole: 2006); ISBN 0811701646/ISBN 9780811701648
- The Border: Exploring the US-Mexican Divide (Stackpole: 2008); ISBN 0811703932/ISBN 9780811703932
- The Return: A Field Manual for Life After Combat (Black Irish Entertainment: 2014); ISBN 193689131X / ISBN 9781936891313
- The Field Researcher's Handbook: A Guide to the Art and Science of Professional Fieldwork (Georgetown University Press: 2017); ISBN 1626164452 / 9781626164451

== Political writing ==
- Compendium of Danelo's published material under the aegis of the FPRI
