= Alfred Daniell =

Alfred Daniell FRSE (1853–1937) was a Welsh-born British advocate, remembered for his contributions to physics. His textbooks have been translated into most European languages, and other languages from Afrikaans to Japanese.

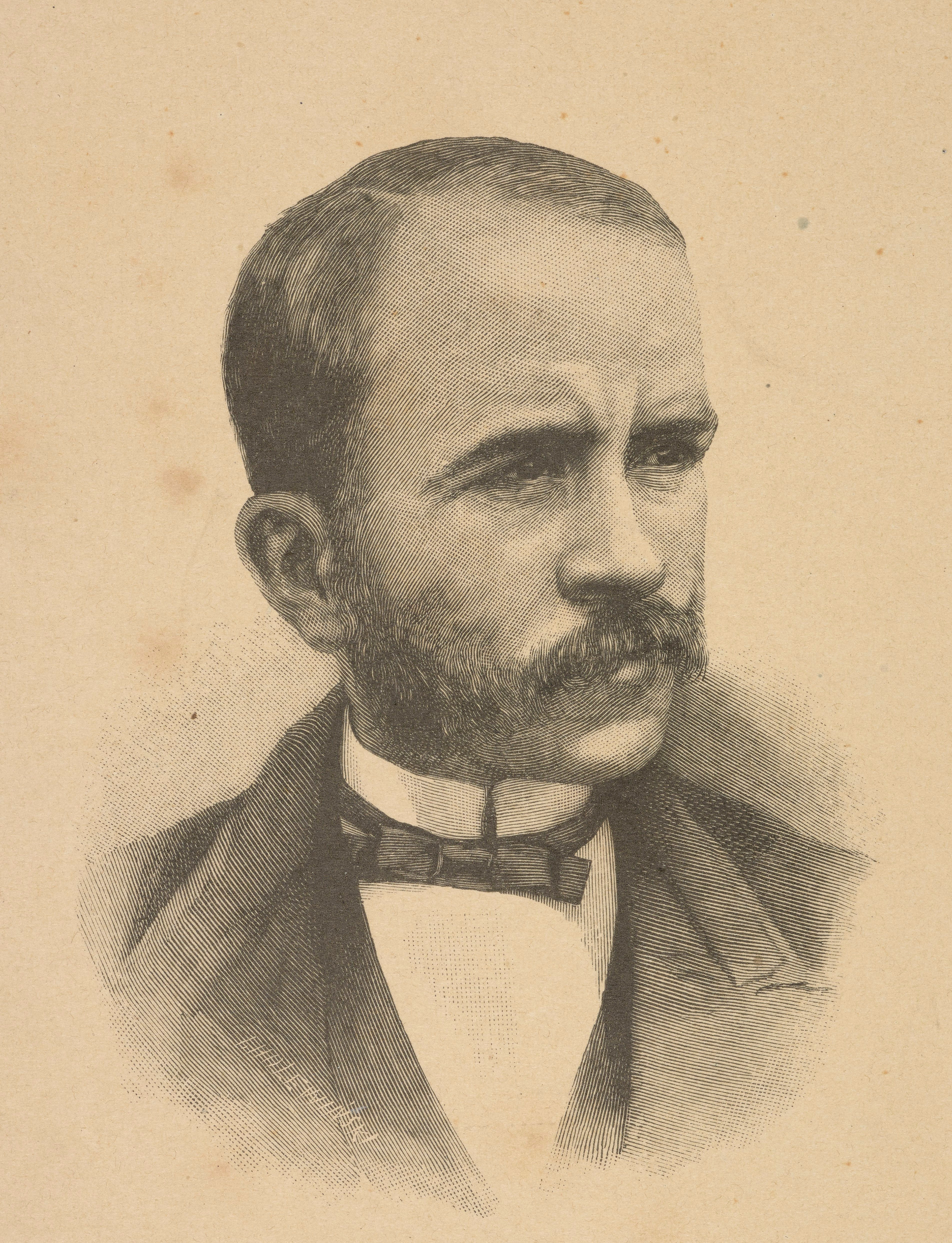
Alfred Daniell

== Biography ==
He was born in Llanelli in Wales the son of Mayler Daniell, an accountant in 1853. He studied at the University of Edinburgh graduating MA LLB in 1874. He received a BSc in 1878 and DSc in 1884. He lectured in physics in medicine at the University of Edinburgh. He was called to the Scottish Bar as an advocate in 1886.

In 1885 he was elected a Fellow of the Royal Society of Edinburgh, his proposers being Alexander Crum Brown, William Lindsay Alexander, James Lorimer and Peter Guthrie Tait. At this time he was living at 40 Gillespie Crescent, a modest flat in the south-west of Edinburgh.

He moved to London in the late 1890s and became a Barrister of the Inner Temple in 1894, specialising in cases requiring scientific knowledge.

He died on 12 January 1937 at his lodgings at Viewforth Gardens in south-west Edinburgh. A large collection of his papers are held by the University of Edinburgh.

Daniell never married and had no children.

== Publications ==
- Textbook of the Principles of Physics (1884)
- Physics for Students of Medicine
- Problems in Physics (1918)
