= Edward Daniell (cricketer) =

English cricketer

Personal information
- Full name: Edward Thomas Daniell
- Born: 11 July 1815; Little Berkhamsted, Hertfordshire, England
- Died: 6 July 1875 (aged 59); Little Berkhamsted, Hertfordshire, England
- Batting: Unknown

Domestic team information
- Years: Team
- 1835–1837: Oxford University

Career statistics
Competition	First-class
Matches	4
Runs scored	32
Batting average	6.40
100s/50s	–/–
Top score	15
Catches/stumpings	–/–
- Source: Cricinfo, 13 December 2013

Edward Thomas Daniell (11 July 1815 – 6 July 1875) was an English cricketer active in the 1830s, making four appearances in first-class cricket. Born at Little Berkhamsted, Hertfordshire, Daniell was educated at Christ Church, Oxford.

Daniell's batting style is unknown. While studying at the University of Oxford, he made his debut in first-class cricket in 1835 for Oxford University against the Marylebone Cricket Club (MCC) at the Magdalen Ground, Oxford. He made a further first-class appearance in that season for the university in the return fixture between the sides at Lord's. In that same season he made a first-class appearance for England against Kent, before making a final appearance in first-class cricket for Oxford University against the MCC in 1837. In four first-class matches, Daniell scored 32 runs at an average of 6.40, with a high score of 15.

He died at the village of his birth on 6 July 1985.
