= Richard Woodman (engraver) =

Richard Woodman (1 July 1784 – 15 December 1859) was an English engraver and miniature portrait painter.

== Life ==
Woodman was born in London. He is often referred to as "The Younger" to distinguish him from his father, Richard Woodman, who was also an engraver. He served his apprenticeship with Robert Mitchell Meadows (?-1812), a stipple engraver. For some years, he found considerable employment creating book illustrations; chiefly portraits of actors, sportsmen, and nonconformist ministers. Plates by him are found in Knight's "Gallery of Portraits", "The Sporting Magazine", the "British Gallery of Art", and Cottle's "Reminiscences". His largest work is the "Judgment of Paris", from the painting by Rubens, now in the National Gallery. In 1808, he was briefly employed as a curator of engravings in Italy. During the latter part of his life, he was mostly a painter of miniatures and small watercolour portraits, which he exhibited occasionally at the Royal Academy between 1820 and 1850. Many of these paintings may be seen in the National Portrait Gallery, London.
