= Tabley Superior =

Civil parish in Cheshire, England

Coordinates: 53.316°N 2.417°W

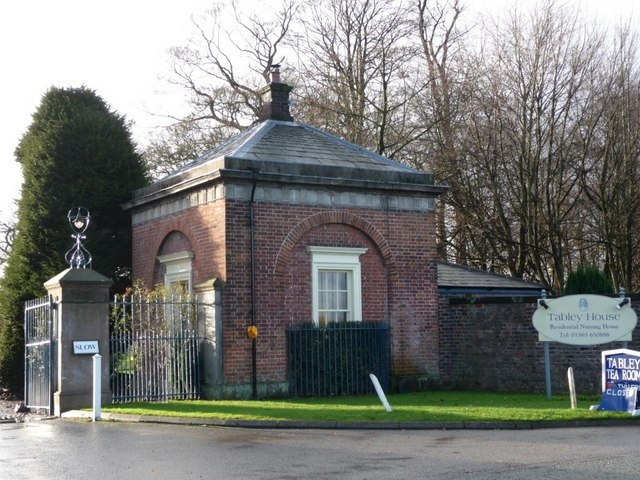
- The western lodge, Tabley House drive

- Location within Cheshire
- Population: 316 (2001)
- OS grid reference: SJ722800
- Civil parish: Tabley Superior
- Unitary authority: Cheshire East
- Ceremonial county: Cheshire
- Region: North West
- Country: England
- Sovereign state: United Kingdom
- Post town: KNUTSFORD
- Postcode district: WA16
- Dialling code: 01565
- Police: Cheshire
- Fire: Cheshire
- Ambulance: North West
- UK Parliament: Tatton

Tabley Superior is a civil parish in the Borough of Cheshire East and ceremonial county of Cheshire in England. In 2001, it had a population of 316. The parish contains the village of Over Tabley.

== See also ==
- Listed buildings in Tabley Superior
