= Danell =

Danell is both a surname and a given name. Notable people with the name include:

- Dennis Danell (1961–2000), American musician
- James Danell (1821–1881), English Roman Catholic bishop
- Sven Danell (1903–1981), Swedish Lutheran bishop
- Danell Leyva (born 1991), American gymnast
- Danell Lynn, American long-distance motorcycle rider
- Danell Nicholson (born 1967), American boxer
