= John Astley (painter) =

English painter

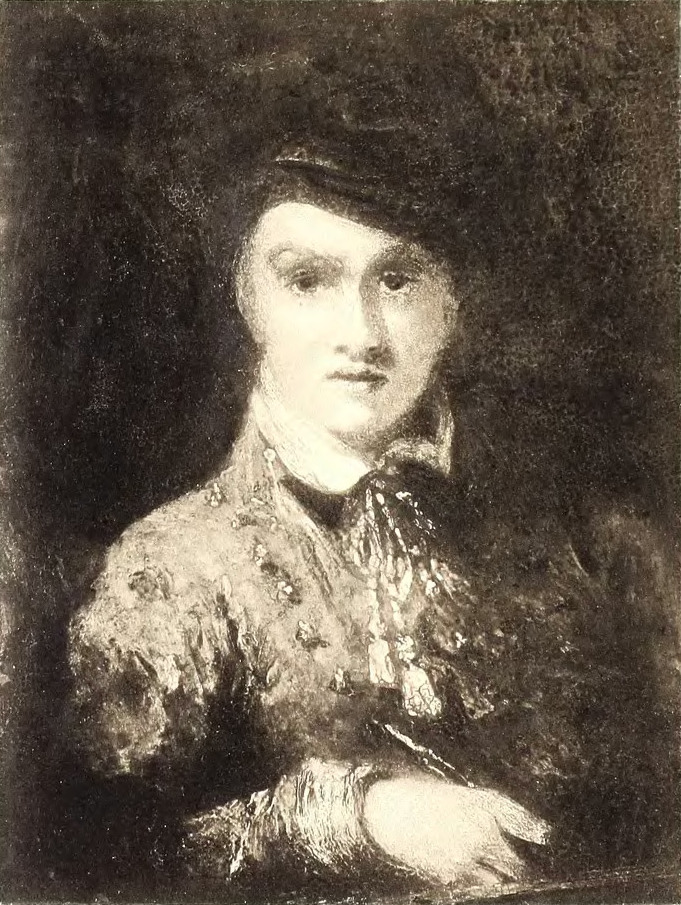
- portrait by Joshua Reynolds
- Born: 24 June 1720 (in Julian calendar); Wem
- Died: 14 November 1787; Cheshire
- Occupation: Painter
- Spouse(s): unknown wife (?), Penelope Vernon, Mary Wagstaffe
- Children: 6, including Francis Dukinfield Astley

John Astley (24 June 1720– 14 November 1787) was an English portrait painter and amateur architect, known for his "patronage among a vast circle of fashion" as well as a fortune acquired through marriage.

== Early life ==
Born in Wem, Shropshire, England, John Astley was a son of an apothecary, Richard Astley (1671–1754), and his wife, Margaret (1685–1735). Among his siblings was a brother Richard, also a physician, whose estate he inherited.

Due to his good looks, he was known as Beau Astley. Some period sources also call him Jack Astley. A biographer of Sir Joshua Reynolds described Astley as "a gasconading spendthrift and a beau of the flashiest order."

Several jaundiced contemporary accounts of Astley's character exist, notably a lengthy observation by John Williams, (aka Anthony Pasquin), who wrote: "He thought that every advantage in civil society was compounded in women and wine: and, acting up to this principal of bliss, he gave his body to Euphrosyne, and his intellects to madness. He was as ostentatious as the peacock and as amorous as the Persian Sophihe. He would never stir abroad without his bag and his sword; and, when the beauties of Ierne sat to him for their portraits, he would affect to neglect the necessary implements of his art, and use his naked sword as a moll-stick. He had a haram and a bath at the top of his house, replete with every enticement and blandishment to awaken desire; and thus lived, jocund and thoughtless, until his nerves were unstrung by age; when his spirits decayed with his animal powers, and he sighed and drooped into eternity!"

== Career as painter ==
In London, in the 1740s, Astley studied with Joshua Reynolds under the artist Thomas Hudson. He later went to study in Rome and Florence in 1747 (one of his teachers was Pompeo Batoni), before establishing his career during several years in Dublin, Ireland, and afterwards settling in England.

Of his work, the Biographical Dictionary of 1789 said, "The best pictures he ever painted were copies of the Bentivolios, and Titian's Venus ...". Horace Walpole claimed Astley's prominence was based "on the peculiarity of his good fortune, rather than by his exertions as an artist ..." and added that "he estimated his profession only by his gains, and having obtained a fortune, treated all future study with contemptuous neglect". Among Astley's own students was the engraver and historical painter John Keyse Sherwin, while Cheshire portraitist Charles Hoyland, who reportedly studied in Rome with Astley, imitated his style.

The painter "had much talent, particularly in portraits", wrote Samuel Redgrave in his 1878 dictionary of English artists. "His color was agreeable, the composition original, drawing fair, but the finish slight, and character and expression weak.

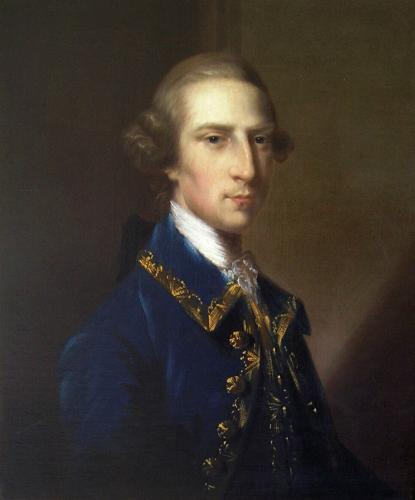
Astley's portrait of British banking heir Tyringham Backwell (1754–1777), painted prior to 1777.

To Sir Horace Mann, 1st Baronet, an Astley admirer and subject, Horace Walpole wrote of a visit to one of Astley's exhibitions in 1752, declaring, "I confess myself a little prejudiced, for he has drawn the whole Pigwigginhood: but he has got too much into the style of the four thousand English painters about town, and is so intolerable as to work for money, not for fame: in short, he is not such a Rubens, as in your head".

Among John Astley's sitters were:

- the artist Sir Joshua Reynolds
- architect Benjamin Latrobe
- Lady Dukinfield Daniel, who became the artist's second wife
- Sir Horace Mann (the 1751 pastel portrait was owned by Horace Walpole)
- Marcus Beresford, 1st Earl of Tyrone, his wife, and daughter, in a group portrait
- Peter John Fremeaux
- Sir Capel Molyneux and his children, in a group portrait (1758, now in the collection of the Ulster Museum in Belfast)
- Rev. Thomas Alleyne of All Saints Church, Loughborough
- Mary Woodyeare, third wife of Hon. Morgan Vane and a daughter-in-law of 2nd Baron Barnard
- Mary Weston (portrait attributed to Astley)
- Colonel Thomas Pepper (now in the collection of the Trinity Art Research Center, Crookshank-Glin Collection)
- Alexander MacDonnell, 5th Earl of Antrim (1713 - 1775)

Astley also painted a portrait of William Shakespeare, which, as reported in the December 1787 issue of the European Magazine, the artist Gilbert Stuart called "far preferable to the famous head in the collection of the Duke of Chandos".

Some sources state that Astley gave up painting after his 1759 second marriage, to the wealthy widow, but a contemporary account indicates that he continued to work after that union: "Beau Astley has contributed half-a-dozen phizes [faces], which, he tells me, he painted for fun; the better luck, so much for being a squire". Another source states that Astley, although now rich, continued to accept commissions and charged a steep "20 guineas, the usual price".

== Career as amateur architect ==
According to a British weekly, Somerset House Gazette, and Literary Museum, Astley was also well known for his alterations to several residences, among them, Schomberg House, built for the third Duke of Schomberg and which Astley owned and used as his London residence.

"In the structure and decoration of small buildings, rich as the time is in architecture, Astley's architecture was pre-eminent: [Schomberg House in] Pall Mall is one instance; Lady Archer's saloon and conservatory [on The Terrace] at Barnes is another; Duckinfield [Lodge] is yet finer than either. The saloon, the loggio [sic] in front, the chamber on each side, and the great octagon, all are as exquisite as original, from their first idea to their last". Of Dukinfield Lodge, which Astley completed in 1775 (demolished 1948), one element was especially admired: "The most interesting room is octagon in form; it is decorated by stained glass, and here was a portion of the valuable collection of pictures acquired by the two Astleys, father and son [Frank Dukinfield Astley]". A 1795 description of Dukinfield Lodge describes it as containing "a fine octagon room with painted windows. Most of the others are small, but elegant, and are decorated with pictures chiefly by the hand of Mr Astley, who had been a painter by profession. The whole building was never finished".

Astley also remodeled Elm Bank, his house in Barnes, which became the home and studio of designer Christopher Dresser in 1889.

== Marriages ==
Called "a ladykiller of the first water", John Astley married three times:

- By his first wife, "an Irish lady ... who died giving birth," he had a daughter, Sophia (1749–1831). She became mistress of George Hyde Clarke, a prominent landowner in Cheshire and Jamaica, and bore him two sons. One of these sons, therefore John's grandson, is an ancestor of British Olympic competitor Lord Coe. In 1792 she married a Frenchman, Louis Foncier, and had further issue.
- Penelope Dukinfield Daniel (1722–1762), widow of Sir William Dukinfield Daniel, 3rd baronet, and a daughter of Henry Vernon. Shortly after the death of her husband, she met Astley at an assembly in Knutsford and was so struck by his appearance that she "contrived the next day to sit for her portrait and the week later, she gave him the original". They married on 7 December 1759, in Rostherne, Cheshire, England, soon after their meeting, and she died in 1762. By this marriage Astley had a stepdaughter, Henrietta (died 1771), and upon the death of his wife he became the owner of the Dukinfield and Daniel estates, including Gorse Hall. The death of his stepdaughter, who had been judged insane, brought him even more money, leading one critic to write, "He owed his fortune to his form; his follies to his fortune!"
- Mary Wagstaffe (1760/1 – 18 February 1832), "a celebrated young beauty" and a daughter of William Wagstaffe, a wealthy surgeon of Manchester. They married in 1777 and had five children: Harriet (1779–1858), Maria (born 1780), Cordelia Emma (born 1783), John William (1785–1823), and Francis Dukinfield Astley (1781–1825), poet and High Sheriff of Cheshire. One of three sisters known as "the Manchester Beauties", Mary Astley married, on 28 January 1793, at Dukinfield Lodge, as her second husband, lawyer William Robert Hay (1761–1839), and had further issue. He later became Vicar of Rochdale and Prebendary of York, and was a son of Lord Edward Hay, governor of Barbados and ambassador to Lisbon; a nephew of Robert Hay Drummond, Archbishop of York; and a grandson of the 8th Earl of Kinnoull.

== Philanthropy ==
Astley donated land and money for causes to improve the town of Dukinfield. He contributed land for the library and to Astley Grammar school as well as helping with restoring churches.

== Burial ==
John Astley died on 14 November 1787 aged 63, at Dukinfield Lodge, and is interred at the Old Chapel in Dukinfield.

== Paintings ==
Works by Astley can be found at:

- Trinity College Dublin, Crookshank-Glin collection
- National Portrait Gallery (London)
- Yale Library, Lewis Walpole Library (British Art Collection)
- Ulster Museum, Belfast, Northern Ireland
