= 1874 in the United Kingdom =

Events from the year 1874 in the United Kingdom.

== Incumbents ==
- Monarch – Victoria
- Prime Minister – William Ewart Gladstone (Liberal) (until 17 February), Benjamin Disraeli (Conservative) (starting 20 February)

== Events ==
- 19 January – Manchester High School for Girls, the first girls' school to provide an academic education in northern England, is founded.
- 23 January – marriage of The Duke of Edinburgh, second son of Queen Victoria, to Grand Duchess Marie Alexandrovna of Russia, younger sister of Alexander III of Russia, in Saint Petersburg.
- 31 January – British defeat the Ashanti at the Battle of Amoaful.
- 20 February to 10 August – agricultural workers' strike.
- 23 February – Walter Clopton Wingfield patents a game called "sphairistike" which is more commonly called lawn tennis.
- 28 February – at the conclusion of one of the longest cases ever heard in an English court, the defendant in the Tichborne case is convicted of perjury and his counsel, Edward Kenealy, is disbarred.
- 5 March – Conservative Party under Benjamin Disraeli, Earl of Beaconsfield win the general election, the first to be held by secret ballot, despite polling fewer votes than the Liberal Party under William Ewart Gladstone. Among those elected are Alexander Macdonald (Lib–Lab) and Thomas Burt (Radical labour), both former coal miners and among the first working class Members of Parliament. Both parties have promised abolition of income tax if elected but this never happens.
- 14 March – peace treaty with the Ashanti gives freedom of movement for British Gold Coast traders, and a promise to end human sacrifice.
- March – Aston Villa F.C. is founded by members of Villa Cross Wesleyan Chapel cricket team in Handsworth, Birmingham.
- 1 April – Dr Frances Morgan marries Dr George Hoggan and they set up the first husband-and-wife general medical practice in the UK.
- 14 April – Astley Deep Pit Disaster: a mining accident as the result of an explosion in Dukinfield, Cheshire, kills 54.
- 13 May – Tsar Alexander II of Russia makes a state visit to Britain.
- July
  - Treaty of Fomena concludes the Third Anglo-Ashanti War.
  - Following trials in London, the GPO agrees that red will replace the current bronze green colour on all pillar and post boxes.
- 7 August
  - Public Worship Regulation Act prohibits ritualistic practices in the Church of England.
  - Second Hertford College founded in the University of Oxford by Act changing the status of Magdalen Hall (on the site of the former Hart Hall).
- 30 August – Factory Act establishes 56-hour working week and prevents children from being used as chimney sweeps.
- Autumn – London School of Medicine for Women founded.

=== Undated ===
- Dante Gabriel Rossetti's oil painting Proserpine, modelled on Jane Morris.
- Frank Cooper's Oxford marmalade first produced by his wife Sarah.
- Other Association football teams founded this year include Bolton Wanderers (as Christ Church F.C.) and Heart of Midlothian F.C. (in Edinburgh).

== Publications ==
- J. R. Green's social history A Short History of the English People.
- Thomas Hardy's novel Far from the Madding Crowd.
- Ordnance Survey concludes publication of "Old Series" maps of England and Wales to a scale of one inch to the mile (1:63,360).

== Births ==
- 20 January – Steve Bloomer, footballer, cricketer and baseball player (died 1938)
- 25 January – W. Somerset Maugham, author (died 1965)
- 11 February – Fritz Hart, composer (died 1949)
- 15 February – Ernest Shackleton, explorer (died 1922)
- 21 February – Lilian Barker, humanitarian, promoter of women's welfare and penal reformer (died 1955)
- 26 March – T. C. Fairbairn, impresario (died 1978)
- 9 May
  - Lilian Baylis, theatrical producer (died 1937)
  - Howard Carter, archaeologist (died 1939)
- 19 May – Gilbert Jessop, cricketer (died 1955)
- 29 May – G. K. Chesterton, author (died 1936)
- 26 July – Tufton Beamish, admiral and politician (died 1951)
- 8 August – Albert Stanley, 1st Baron Ashfield, businessman (died 1948)
- 21 September – Gustav Holst, composer (died 1934)
- 15 October – Prince Alfred of Edinburgh and Saxe-Coburg-Gotha (died 1899)
- 18 October – Christine Murrell, medical doctor, first female member of the British Medical Association's Central Council (died 1933)
- 25 October – Geoffrey Dawson, born George Geoffrey Robinson, editor of The Times (died 1944)
- 26 October – Martin Lowry, chemist (died 1936)
- 31 October – J. H. Thomas, Welsh-born politician (died 1949)
- 6 November – Katharine Stewart-Murray, Duchess of Atholl, née Ramsay, "Red Duchess", Scottish politician and humanitarian (died 1960)
- 30 November – Winston Churchill, Prime Minister of the United Kingdom, recipient of the Nobel Prize in Literature (died 1965)
- 29 December – Cecil Hunter-Rodwell, colonial administrator (died 1953)

== Deaths ==
- 24 January – Adam Black, Scottish publisher (born 1784)
- 24 February – Shirley Brooks, journalist and novelist (born 1816)
- 19 April – Owen Jones, architect and interior designer (born 1809)
- 24 April – John Phillips, geologist (born 1800)
- 8 July – Agnes Strickland, popular historian (born 1796)
- 18 August
  - Sir William Fairbairn, Scottish civil engineer (born 1789)
  - Sackville Lane-Fox, politician (born 1797)
- 24 August – William Betty, child actor (born 1791)
- 3 September – John Rennie the Younger, civil engineer (born 1794)
- 12 September – Francis E. Anstie, doctor and journalist (born 1833)
- 5 October – Bryan Procter, poet (born 1787)
- 24 October – Thomas Miller, poet (born 1807)
- 18 November – Sir Henry Prescott, admiral and colonial administrator (born 1783)
- 20 November – Tom Hood, humorist (born 1835)
- 21 November – Sir William Jardine, 7th Baronet, naturalist (born 1800)
