= Old Hall Chapel =

Listed former chapel in Dukinfield, Greater Manchester, England

- Dukinfield Old Hall Congregational Chapel
- Location in Greater Manchester
- 53.4699°N 2.0995°W
- OS grid reference: SJ 93494 97026
- Address: Old Hall Street, Dukinfield, Greater Manchester
- Country: England

History
- Status: Derelict

Architecture
- Heritage designation: Grade II*
- Designated: 17 December 1970
- Architectural type: Chapel
- Years built: Late 16th or early 17th century

Specifications
- Materials: Ashlar, clay tile

Old Hall Chapel is a former chapel on Old Hall Street in Dukinfield, a town in Tameside, Greater Manchester, England. The present structure dates from the late 16th or early 17th century and is among the oldest surviving buildings in the town. It is recorded in the National Heritage List for England as a Grade II* listed building, recognised for its architectural and historic interest and for its association with the Dukinfield family, the former lords of the manor. The chapel has undergone periods of alteration, disuse, and decline, and as of 2025 it remains on Historic England's Heritage at Risk Register, assessed as being in very bad condition with no agreed solution for its repair or reuse.

== History ==
Old Hall Chapel is thought to have originated as the private chapel of the Dukinfield family of the now-demolished Dukinfield Hall, who held the manor from the medieval period until the 18th century. The present structure dates from the late 16th or early 17th century and was built on the site of an earlier private chapel of the Dukinfield family, which had been licensed by the bishop of Lichfield in 1398. Its construction is associated with Sir Robert Dukinfield and his descendants, who were prominent in the political and religious life of the area. At this site Samuel Eaton established a Congregational church, probably before the end of 1640 or in early 1641, described as the "first Independent Church visible and framed that was set up in England".

During the 17th century the chapel became linked with Nonconformist worship, reflecting the Puritan sympathies of Colonel Robert Dukinfield, a Parliamentarian commander during the English Civil War. Tradition holds that dissenting congregations met at the chapel during this period, although it never developed into a fully established meeting house. After the Restoration, religious use declined and the building gradually fell out of regular service.

The chapel was enlarged during the 19th century to serve as the transept of a Congregational church which was later demolished.

On 17 December 1970, Dukinfield Old Chapel was designated a Grade II* listed building. In 1978 the building was damaged when it was deliberately set on fire, leaving the structure in a deteriorated state. The surrounding area has since been redeveloped, and the chapel ruins now stand within an industrial estate.

=== Heritage at Risk Register ===
The condition of the building deteriorated significantly during the 20th century as maintenance lapsed and the surrounding area was redeveloped. Although various conservation proposals were discussed, no comprehensive scheme was implemented. The chapel was subsequently added to Historic England's Heritage at Risk Register, where it remains listed as being in very bad condition with no agreed solution for repair or reuse. As of 2025, the structure is stabilised only to a limited degree, and its long‑term future depends on the development of a viable conservation strategy.

== Architecture ==
The building is constructed in ashlar with a later roof of clay tile. It comprises a nave and chancel, the ritual west wall no longer surviving following the demolition of the main church. The chancel has one bay and the nave has two, each bay containing a stepped three‑light, round‑headed, cavetto‑moulded mullion window with a segmental hood mould. A doorway on the west side of the nave has a chamfered surround, although the lintel is missing. The priest's door has a segmental lintel and a chamfered surround. The east window is of three lights, matching the others but double‑chamfered, with cusped heads and an elliptical hood mould. External features include a projecting plinth, 19th‑century coped gables with kneelers, and 19th‑century eaves gutter brackets.

=== Interior ===
Internally, the features include a double‑chamfered, semi-circular chancel arch. The 19th‑century hammerbeam roof has suffered fire damage, and the surviving structure is in a derelict state.

== See also ==
- Grade II* listed buildings in Greater Manchester
- Listed buildings in Dukinfield
