= Dukinfield Town Hall =

Municipal building in Dukinfield, Greater Manchester, England

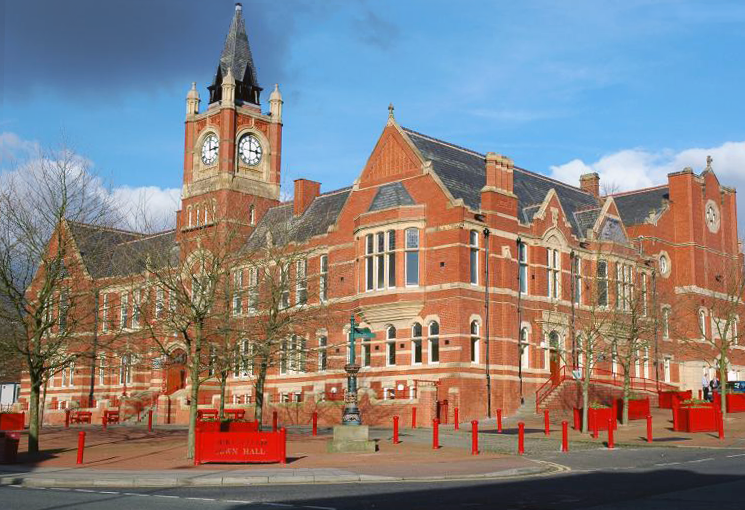
- Dukinfield Town Hall

- Shown in Greater Manchester
- 53.4779°N 2.0922°W
- Location: King Street, Dukinfield

History
- Built: 1901

Site notes
- Architect(s): John Eaton, Sons and Cantrell
- Architectural style: Gothic style

Listed Building – Grade II
- Official name: Dukinfield Town Hall
- Designated: 9 February 2012
- Reference no.: 1403441

Dukinfield Town Hall is a municipal building in King Street, Dukinfield, Greater Manchester, England. The town hall, which was the headquarters of Dukinfield Borough Council, is a grade II listed building.

== History ==
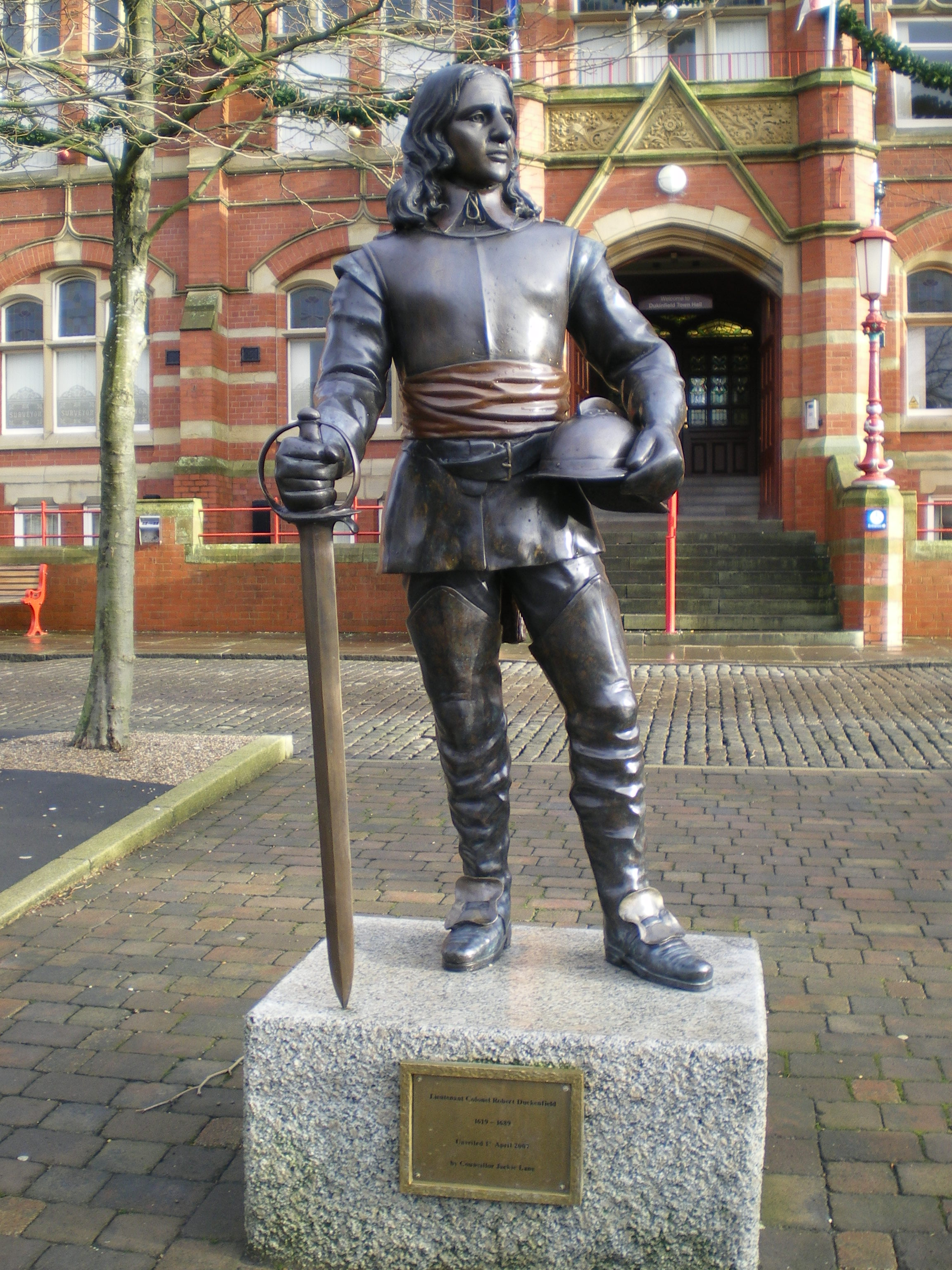
Statue of Lieutenant Colonel Robert Duckenfield

Shortly after it had been created in 1857, the local board of health established itself in some offices on the east side of King Street in an area designated the Market Place. Population growth associated with the increasing number of local cotton mills led to the area becoming an urban district in 1894 and a municipal borough in 1899. In this context civic leaders decided to demolish the existing offices and to erect a town hall slightly further back from where they had been.

The foundation stone for the new building was laid by Mrs Gertrude Susan Nicholson of Dukinfield Lodge and of Arisaig on 23 September 1899. It was designed by John Eaton, Sons and Cantrell in the Gothic style, built by John Robinson of Ashton-under-Lyne and officially opened by the mayor, Alderman James Pickup, on 15 June 1901. The design involved a symmetrical main frontage with nine bays facing onto King Street with the end bays slightly projected forward as pavilions with oriel windows on the first floor and gables above; the central bay featured an arched doorway on the ground floor, a carved frieze, a balcony and a triple window on the first floor, with the borough coat of arms, a wide segmental arch and a clock tower with a steep spire above. The clock was designed by J. B. Joyce & Co of Whitchurch and the bells were cast by John Taylor & Co of Loughborough. Internally, the principal rooms were the council chamber, the lesser hall and mayor's parlour.

The building was extended to the rear to create the main assembly hall, subsequently renamed the Jubilee Hall, in 1936. The building continued to serve as the headquarters of Dukinfield Borough Council but ceased to be the local seat of government when the enlarged Tameside Metropolitan Borough Council was formed in 1974.

A blue plaque was fixed to the building to commemorate the life of the local composer, John Golland, who specialised in music for brass bands, in April 1997 and the council chamber was renamed the George Hatton Room, following the death, in 2004, of Councillor George Hatton, who had served as mayor of Tameside in the early 1980s.

After an extensive programme of refurbishment works costing £3 million had been completed in January 2005, the building re-opened as the main registry office for Tameside. A statue designed and made by Escar UK Bronze depicting the local soldier, Lieutenant Colonel Robert Duckenfield, who commanded Parliamentarian forces during the English Civil War, was unveiled outside the building in April 2010. A blue plaque was also fixed to the building to commemorate his life.

== See also ==
- Listed buildings in Dukinfield
