= Samuel Robinson (industrialist) =

British businessman (1794–1884)

- Born: 1794
- Died: 1884 (aged 89–90)
- Occupation: Businessman

Samuel Robinson (1794–1884) was an English industrialist and scholar of Persian who founded the Dukinfield Village Library in 1833.

Robinson was a Unitarian, and is often called the "foremost promoter of education in the district" by the people of Dukinfield.

Professional and academic associations
Preceded by John Roberton	President of the Manchester Statistical Society; 1847–49	Succeeded by Henry Houldsworth
