= Listed buildings in Dukinfield =

Dukinfield is a town in Tameside, Greater Manchester, England. The town and the surrounding area contains 20 listed buildings that are recorded in the National Heritage List for England. Of these, two are listed at Grade II*, the middle grade, and the others are at Grade II, the lowest grade. The listed buildings include farmhouses, farm buildings, houses, churches and items in churchyards, an aqueduct, railway viaducts, mills, civic buildings, cemetery buildings, and war memorials.

== Key ==
Grade	Criteria
II*	Particularly important buildings of more than special interest
II	Buildings of national importance and special interest

== Buildings ==
Name and location	Photograph	Date	Notes	Grade
Old Hall Chapel; 53.46999°N 2.09944°W	—	Late 16th or early 17th century	Originally the private chapel of Dukinfield Hall, later a transept of a Congregational church, both of which have been demolished, it is now in a ruinous state. It is in stone on a projecting plinth, with coped gables, and consists of a one-bay chancel and a two-bay nave. The windows are mullioned with hood moulds, and there are two doorways with chamfered surrounds.	II*
Wrigleyfold Farmhouse and cottages 53.46639°N 2.03720°W	—	1707	A farmhouse and two cottages, extended in 1738 and later, in stone with stone-slate roofs. They have two storeys, a double-depth plan, mullioned windows, and doorways with moulded surrounds and dated lintels. The extension to the left is taller and has a doorway with a plain surround and an attic.	II
Bardsley Gate Farmhouse, Bardsley Gate Cottage and Mead Cottage; 53.46665°N 2.02966°W	—	1736	Three cottages, with three bays added in the late 19th century, they are in stone with stone-slate roofs. They have two storeys, a double depth plan, and a total of five bays. The older part is lower, it has quoins, a dated lintel, and two bays. There is one casement window, and the other windows are mullioned.	II
Three chest tombs 53.47826°N 2.08639°W	—	18th century	The chest tombs are in the graveyard to the south of Dukinfield Old Chapel, and are in stone with a moulded base, and an inscribed slab. The oldest is dated 1713, the second is dated 1735, and the third, which has square urns on the corners, is dated 1752.	II
Aqueduct over the River Tame; 53.48226°N 2.09936°W		1794–1801	The aqueduct carries the Peak Forest Canal over the River Tame. It is in stone with arches in engineering brick, and consists of three elliptical arches, between which are tapering pilasters and cutwaters with semicircular ends. The aqueduct has two stone bands, and the parapet walls are curved and end in square piers.	II
Crescent Road Mill; 53.48330°N 2.09057°W	—	1819	Also known as St Helen's Mill, it was a combined steam-powered cotton spinning and weaving mill, and was expanded in phases during the 19th century. It is in brick with a cement tile roof, and forms five ranges around a courtyard. The main range along Crescent Road has four storeys, sides of 22 and four bays, a stair tower, and a privy tower with diamond-shaped vents, and to the north is an engine house.	II
St John's Church; 53.47712°N 2.07264°W		1838–40	A Commissioners' church designed by Edmund Sharpe, in stone with a slate roof. It consists of a nave, north and south aisles, a small chancel, and a west tower. The tower has four stages, a west door, octagonal buttressed corner piers that rise to pinnacles, clock apertures, and a coped parapet. The windows are paired lancets.	II
Dukinfield Old Chapel; 53.47840°N 2.08652°W		1838–41	A Unitarian chapel that was designed by Richard Tattersall, and the west front was refaced by Thomas Worthington in 1892–93. The chapel is in ashlar stone with a slate roof, and has a cruciform plan. It consists of a nave with a clerestory, north and south aisles, north and south transepts, and an east organ chamber. At the west end is a doorway over which is a five-light window with Geometrical tracery, and this is flanked by octagonal pinnacles with buttresses and small stair wings. The other windows are lancets.	II*
Park Parade Railway Viaduct; Eastern crossing 53.48264°N 2.09589°W		1845	The viaduct was built by the Oldham, Ashton and Guide Bridge Railway to carry its line over the River Tame. It is in stone, and consists of seven segmental arches. The arches have rusticated voussoirs with keystones, and are carried on square piers with shaped cutwaters. The parapets have bands and coping.	II
Park Parade Railway Viaduct; Western crossing 53.48079°N 2.10020°W		1845	The viaduct was built by the Oldham, Ashton and Guide Bridge Railway to carry its line over the River Tame. It is in stone, and consists of three segmental arches. The arches have rusticated voussoirs, and are carried on square piers with shaped cutwaters. The parapets have bands, coping, and square terminal piers.	II
St Mark's Church; 53.48022°N 2.09535°W		1848–49	A Commissioners' church designed by Joseph Clarke, with the tower added in 1880–81. It is in stone and has slate roofs with coped gables and cross finials. The church consists of a nave with a clerestory, north and south aisles, a south porch, a chancel with a vestry and organ chamber, and a northwest tower. The tower has four stages, angle buttresses, clock faces, and a machicolated parapet with stepped merlons and grotesque gargoyles. The windows along the aisles are paired lancets, and in the clerestory are circular windows.	II
Chapel and crematorium, Dukinfield Cemetery; 53.47968°N 2.08363°W		1865	Originally two chapels at right angles to each other, one later converted into a crematorium, they are in gritstone, and have Welsh slate roofs with coped gables and red clay ridge tiles. In the angle is a square two-stage tower with pilaster buttresses, a cornice, detached pyramidal pinnacles, an octagonal turret with shafts, and a spire with blind lucarnes. The windows contain Geometrical tracery.	II
Office, Dukinfield Cemetery; 53.47992°N 2.08562°W		1865	The office is in gritstone with bands, and it has a Welsh slate roof with coped gables. There are two storeys and an L-shaped plan, with a service wing at the rear. In the angle is a tower containing an arched doorway, a bell canopy, and a Rhenish helm containing clock faces. To the left of the tower is a gabled range with a mullioned and tramsomed window on the ground floor and a two-light window above.	II
St Luke's Church; 53.47450°N 2.09111°W		1889	The church is in red brick with dressings and decoration in stone and terracotta, and a Welsh slate roof with red ridge tiles. The church consists of a nave, a west narthex, narrow north and south aisles, a south baptistry, internal transepts, a short chancel, a sanctuary with a polygonal apse, and a southeast vestry. At the west end is a window of five stepped lancets flanked by buttresses that rise to become polygonal turrets, and on the gable is a double bellcote.	II
Tower Mill; 53.48082°N 2.07600°W		c. 1890	Originally a cotton spinning mill, later used for other purposes, it is in red brick with stone dressings and decoration in yellow brick, and is in Italianate style. There are four storeys and sides of 17 and four bays with pilasters between the bays and on the corners. On the south side is a water and stair tower rising by two stages above the mill, and with its name in terracotta. At the rear is an internal engine house, with a boiler house and chimney outside. To the west of the tower is an office block with two storeys and five bays.	II
Town Hall; 53.47792°N 2.09242°W		1899–1901	The town hall is in red brick with sandstone dressings and a slate roof, and is in Gothic style. It has an E-shaped plan, two storeys with a basement, and a symmetrical front. In the centre is a clock tower containing the entrance. Steps lead up to a doorway with a segmental arch, above which is a frieze, and a segmental arch containing a coat of arms and a three-light window. At the top of the tower are pinnacles with cupolas and a spire. At the ends of the building are projecting gabled bays with finials, forming pavilions and containing oriel windows.	II
Dukinfield Hall war memorial 53.47133°N 2.10136°W		1920	The war memorial stands at a road junction, and is surrounded by metal railings. It is in Yorkshire stone, and is 4.3 metres (14 ft) tall. The memorial consists of a square two-stage base and a plinth, on which is a wheel-head cross on a broad pillar with decorated panels at the bottom and a moulded collar at the top. The plinth is carved with the names of those who were lost, and those who served, in the First World War.	II
War memorial, Park Road; 53.48157°N 2.08381°W	—	1920	The war memorial stands towards the north end of the cemetery. It is in stone, and consists of an angel holding a wreath to a cross. The angel stands on a tall square pier carved with the names of those lost. The memorial is surrounded by square stone piers and cast iron rails.	II
Newton Wood war memorial 53.46738°N 2.08946°W		c. 1920	The war memorial stands at a road junction, it is square, and in stone. The memorial has a stepped plinth, the names of those lost in both World Wars are inscribed on the sides, and at the top on each side is a pediment with carving in the tympanum. The whole is surmounted by a carved crown.	II
War memorial, The Crescent; 53.47796°N 2.08704°W		1922	The war memorial stands at a road junction. It is in sandstone, and consists of a square base and a tapering shaft, on which stands the bronze figure of a soldier in battledress. Carved on the shaft are wreaths and a shield, and below these are bronze plaques containing the names of those lost in the First World War. There is a similar plaque on the base relating to the Second World War.	II
