= Dukinfield Old Chapel =

Listed chapel in Greater Manchester, England

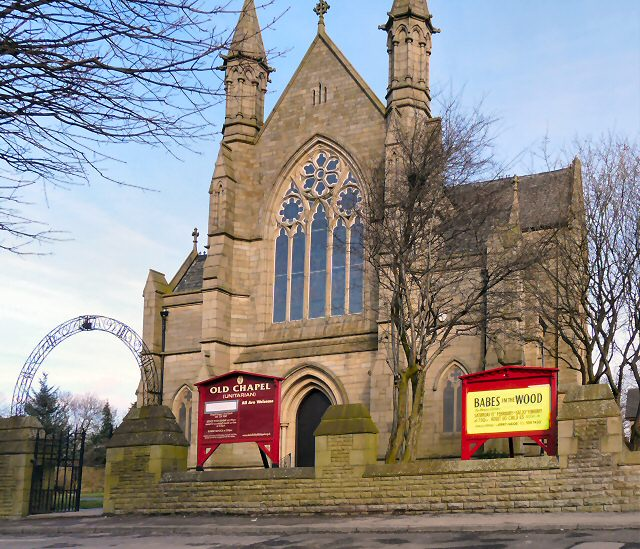
- Dukinfield Old Chapel in 2010

- Location in Greater Manchester
- 53.4784°N 2.0865°W
- OS grid reference: SJ 94359 97963
- Address: Old Road, Dukinfield, Greater Manchester
- Country: England
- Denomination: Unitarian
- Website: dukinfieldoldchapelunitarians.org.uk

Architecture
- Heritage designation: Grade II*
- Designated: 17 December 1970
- Architect(s): Robert Tattersall (1838–1841); Worthington & Elgood (1892–93)
- Architectural type: Chapel
- Style: Gothic Revival
- Years built: 1838–1841; 185 years ago 1892–93 (west front refaced)

Specifications
- Materials: Ashlar, slate

Dukinfield Old Chapel is a Unitarian chapel on Old Road in Dukinfield, a town in Tameside, Greater Manchester, England. The present building was constructed between 1838 and 1841 to the designs of Robert Tattersall, with the west front refaced by Worthington & Elgood in the early 1890s. It stands within a historic graveyard containing several listed 18th‑century monuments and continues a tradition of Nonconformist worship in the area dating back to the 17th century. The chapel is recorded in the National Heritage List for England as a Grade II* listed building. As of 2025, it remains on Historic England's Heritage at Risk Register, rated in very bad condition with no agreed solution.

== History ==
The origins of organised Nonconformist worship in Dukinfield date to the late 17th century, when a congregation formed around the ministry of the Revd Samuel Angier. In 1707 a purpose‑built meeting house was erected on land leased from the Duckenfield family, the local lords of the manor, who were long associated with Puritanism and dissenting religious traditions. The site, later known as Chapel Hill, remained the centre of Unitarian worship in the town for more than a century.

By the early 19th century the original meeting house had become inadequate, and between 1838 and 1841 a new chapel was constructed on the same site to the designs of the Manchester architect Robert Tattersall.

The west front was rebuilt and refaced by the architectural partnership Worthington & Elgood in 1892–93, giving the chapel its present sandstone façade with pinnacles and a more elaborate Gothic Revival character.

On 17 December 1970, Dukinfield Old Chapel was designated a Grade II* listed building.

The chapel continues to serve as a community and heritage venue. It is not part of any diocese or archdiocese; as a Unitarian congregation it operates independently, affiliating instead with the General Assembly of Unitarian and Free Christian Churches.

=== Heritage at Risk Register ===
The chapel has previously received grants for urgent repairs, including work to address dry rot, from specific Unitarian and Free Christian bodies, and has sought support from the National Lottery Heritage Fund.

As of 2025, the building is listed on the Heritage at Risk Register with its condition rated as "very bad" and with "no solution agreed".

== Architecture ==
The chapel is constructed in ashlar with a roof of slate. The plan is cruciform, incorporating aisles, a three‑sided gallery, and an east organ. The design follows an early 14th-century style. The west front has a doorway set below a five‑light window with tracery. Large octagonal pinnacles, buttressed at the lower stages, flank the gable, with small stair wings to each side. The transepts contain three lancet windows and have raked, coped gables with clasping buttresses and kneelers. Both sides of the transepts contain three bays with flat buttresses, lancet aisle windows fitted with hood moulds and carved stops, and lancet clerestory windows flanked by smaller blind lancets.

=== Interior ===
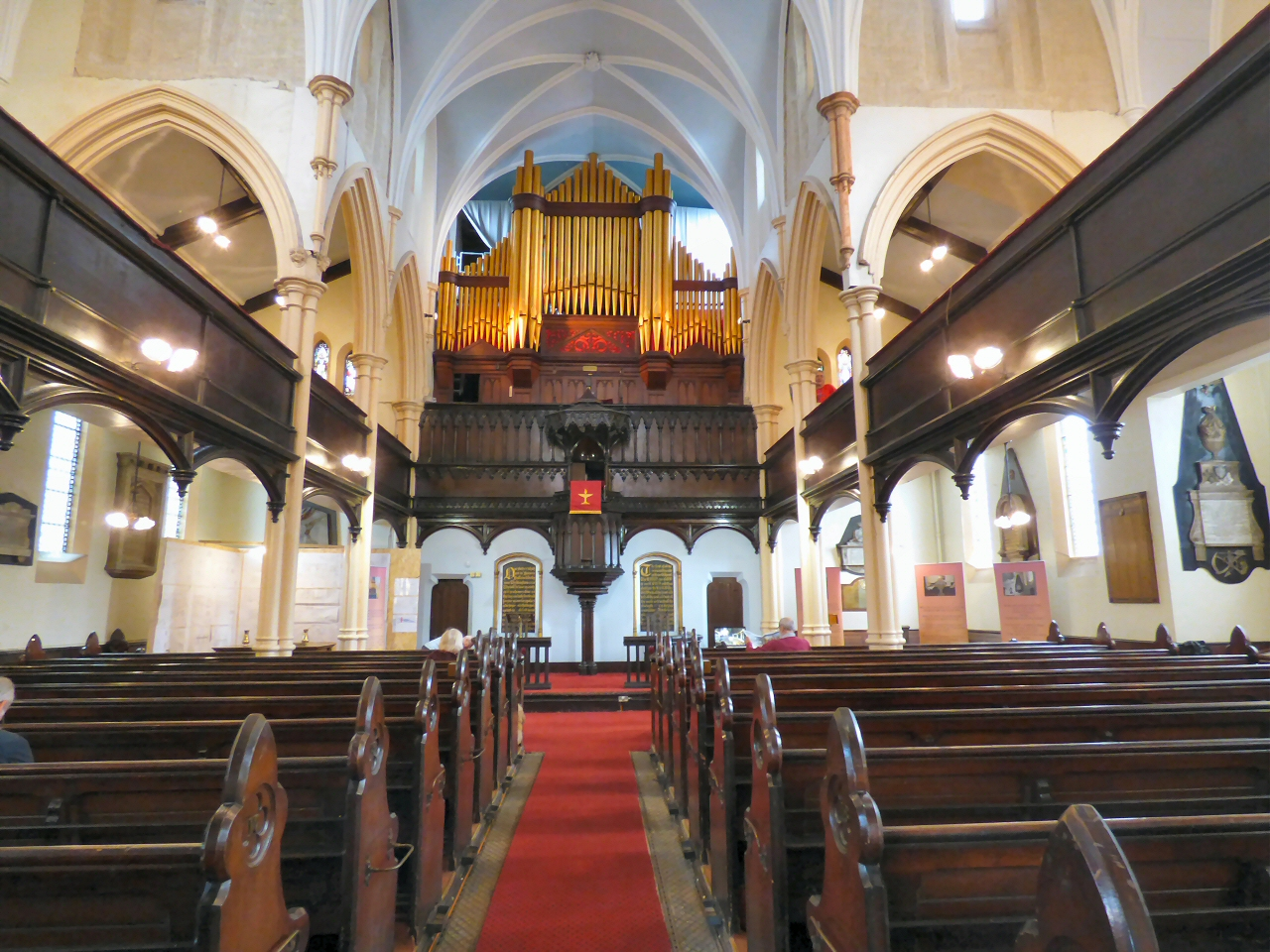
The chapel's interior

Internally, the galleries and the nave arcade are supported by quatrefoil piers with cast-iron cores. The nave and transepts are lofty and have quadripartite vaulting. Timberwork features include a central pulpit that is elevated. Various wall plaques are present. The stained glass windows are by Jean-Baptiste Capronnier, Francois-Ambroise Comere, and Morris & Co., of various dates. The north transept window by Morris depicts Saint George, David, and Jonathan.

== Associated tombs ==
Three 18th‑century chest tombs stand in the graveyard south of the chapel, all listed at Grade II. The earliest is dated 1713, the second 1735, and the third is dated 1752, distinguished by square urns at its corners.

== See also ==
- Grade II* listed buildings in Greater Manchester
- Listed buildings in Dukinfield
