= All Saints Catholic College, Dukinfield =

All Saints Catholic College
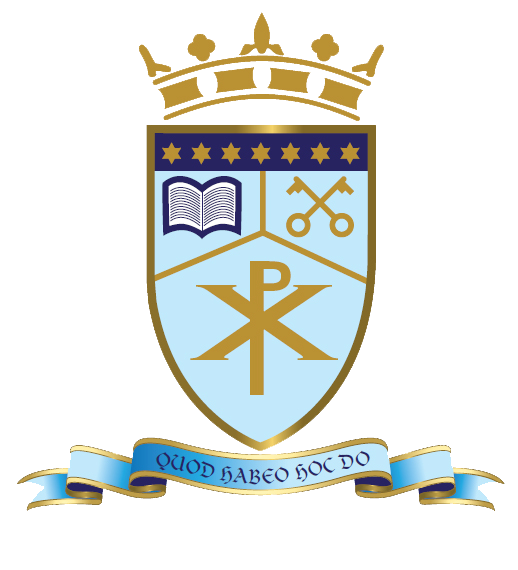

Location
- Birch Lane; Dukinfield; Greater Manchester, SK16 5AP; England
- Coordinates: 53.4717°N 2.00636°W

Information
- Type: Academy
- Motto: "Be inspired. Be excellent. Succeed."
- Religious affiliation: Roman Catholic
- Local authority: Tameside Council
- Department for Education URN: 139735 Tables
- Ofsted: Reports
- Chair: Colette Garner
- Headteacher: Natalie Gilligan
- Gender: Coeducational
- Age: 11 to 16
- Colours: Blue and gold
- Website: http://www.allsaintscatholiccollege.com/

All Saints Catholic College is a coeducational Roman Catholic secondary school with academy status. It is located in Dukinfield in the English county of Greater Manchester.

== History ==
Originally opened in 1962, as St. Peter and Paul's Roman Catholic Secondary School, the school was opened to serve the parishes of St. Mary's Dukinfield, St. Paul's Hyde, and St. Peter's Stalybridge.

Previously a voluntary aided school administered by Tameside Metropolitan Borough Council, All Saints Catholic College converted to academy status on 1 June 2013. The school is part of the St. Anselm's Multi Academy Trust (MAT), administered by the Roman Catholic Diocese of Shrewsbury, and made up of the local Primary Schools in the area.

In July 2018 headteacher Linda Emmett was selected as the Manchester Evening News Headteacher of the year. Also in July 2018, the school gained a good rating from Ofsted with an outstanding judgement for pupils’ personal development and welfare.

The school works in partnership with Blessed Thomas Holford Catholic College, an outstanding school in Altrincham. Their headteacher, John Cornally, is Executive Headteacher of All Saints and a National Leader of Education.

== Education ==
All Saints Catholic College offers GCSEs and BTECs as programmes of study for pupils.

== Sixth Form ==
In November 2014, it was announced the Governing Body at All Saints Catholic College, and Diocese and Directors of the Multi Academy trust, had decided to consult on the proposal not to recruit new Sixth Form students from September 2015. This meant that the Sixth Form closed in August 2016.
