= John Roberton (born 1797) =

Scottish physician and social reformer

John Roberton (20 March 1797 – 24 August 1876) was a Scottish physician and social reformer. He was a pioneer of modern obstetrics and of evidence-based medicine, and influential in the intellectual life of Victorian Manchester.

== Life ==
Roberton was born near Hamilton, Lanarkshire and educated for the medical profession at Glasgow and Edinburgh. He was admitted a member of the Royal College of Surgeons of Edinburgh in 1817. He intended to be a ship's surgeon, and was on his way to the West Indies when he was wrecked on the Lancashire coast. While at Liverpool he was encouraged to take up his residence at Warrington. He became a Licentiate of the Society of Apothecaries in 1822, and on 9 October 1823 married Mary (1794/5–1851), daughter of David Bellhouse. The couple subsequently moved to Manchester. He soon had an extensive general practice, and, on his appointment in 1827 to the post of surgeon to the Manchester Lying-in Hospital, turned his special attention to midwifery and to the physiology and diseases of women and children. He was also a lecturer at the Marsden Street School of Medicine. His first publication was Observations on the Mortality and Physical Management of Children (1827). From 1830 onwards he wrote a series of scientific papers for the Edinburgh Medical and Surgical Journal on the time of onset of female puberty in various countries, which led James Cowles Prichard to alter some of the conclusions which he had arrived at in the earlier editions of his Physical History of Mankind. These, along with other similar papers, are reprinted in Roberton's most important work, Essays and Notes on the Physiology and Diseases of Women and on Practical Midwifery (London, 1851). He devoted much time to the subject of hospital construction and the provision of convalescent homes, on which he wrote a number of pamphlets between 1831 and 1861.

Roberton's advice was largely sought in the discipline in which he had specialized, obstetrics, and he was aware of the broader social and medical context of his work. He helped much to extend the fame of the Manchester school of obstetrics founded by Charles White and continued by John Hull and Thomas Radford.

He was an active social reformer, interesting himself in all local and national movements for improving the condition of working people and active in the Manchester Statistical Society. In religion, he was a puritan and nonconformist, and the intimate friend of the popular preachers Robert Stephen McAll and Robert Halley.

He died at his residence at New Mills, Derbyshire, where he had retired on relinquishing his practice. His wealth at death was under £40,000 (under £2.9 million at 2003 prices).

== Works by Roberton ==
- [Anon., J. Roberton] (1851) On the Partition of Landed Property
- Fagg, J. [J. Roberton] (1853) Educational Voluntaryism an amiable Delusion
- Roberton, J. (1836) Critical Remarks on certain recently published Opinions concerning Life and Mind
- — (1839) Answer to Objections against Vaccination
- — (1840) On a Proposal to withhold Outdoor Relief from Widows with Families
- — (1845a) Report on the Amount and Causes of Death in Manchester
- — (1845b) On the Proper Regulation of Labourers engaged in the Construction and Working of Railways
- — (1850) On the Climate of Manchester
- — (1854) Improvement of Municipal Government
- — (1855) National Schools of Ireland
- — (1857) On certain Legalised Forms of Temptation as Causes of Crime
- — (1862a) Insalubrity of the Deep Cornish Mines
- — (1862b) On the Laws of Nature's Ventilation
- — (1865) The Duty of England to provide a Gratuitous Compulsory Education for the Children of the Poorer Classes
- Topping, G. [J. Roberton] (1854) Educational Voluntaryism an amiable Delusion

== Notes ==
Professional and academic associations
Preceded by William Langton	President of the Manchester Statistical Society; 1844–47	Succeeded by Samuel Robinson
