= George Forbes (footballer, born 1914) =

English footballer

Personal information
- Full name: George Parrott Forbes
- Date of birth: 21 July 1914
- Place of birth: Dukinfield, England
- Date of death: 28 November 1964 (aged 50)
- Place of death: Barrow, England
- Position: Centre half

Senior career*
Years	Team	Apps	(Gls)
19??–1933	Crescent Road Congregational		
1933–193?	Mossley		(1)
193?–1937	Hyde United		
1937–1946	Blackburn Rovers	2	(1)
1946	Hurst	0	(0)
1946–1950	Barrow	177	(3)
- * Club domestic league appearances and goals

George Parrott Forbes (21 July 1914 – 28 November 1964) was an English professional footballer who made 179 appearances in the Football League playing as a centre half for Blackburn Rovers and Barrow either side of the Second World War. He also played non-league football for Crescent Road Congregational, Mossley, Hyde United and Hurst. Forbes was born in 1914 in Dukinfield, Cheshire, and died in 1964 at the age of 50 in Barrow-in-Furness, which was then in Lancashire.
