= Robert Duckenfield =

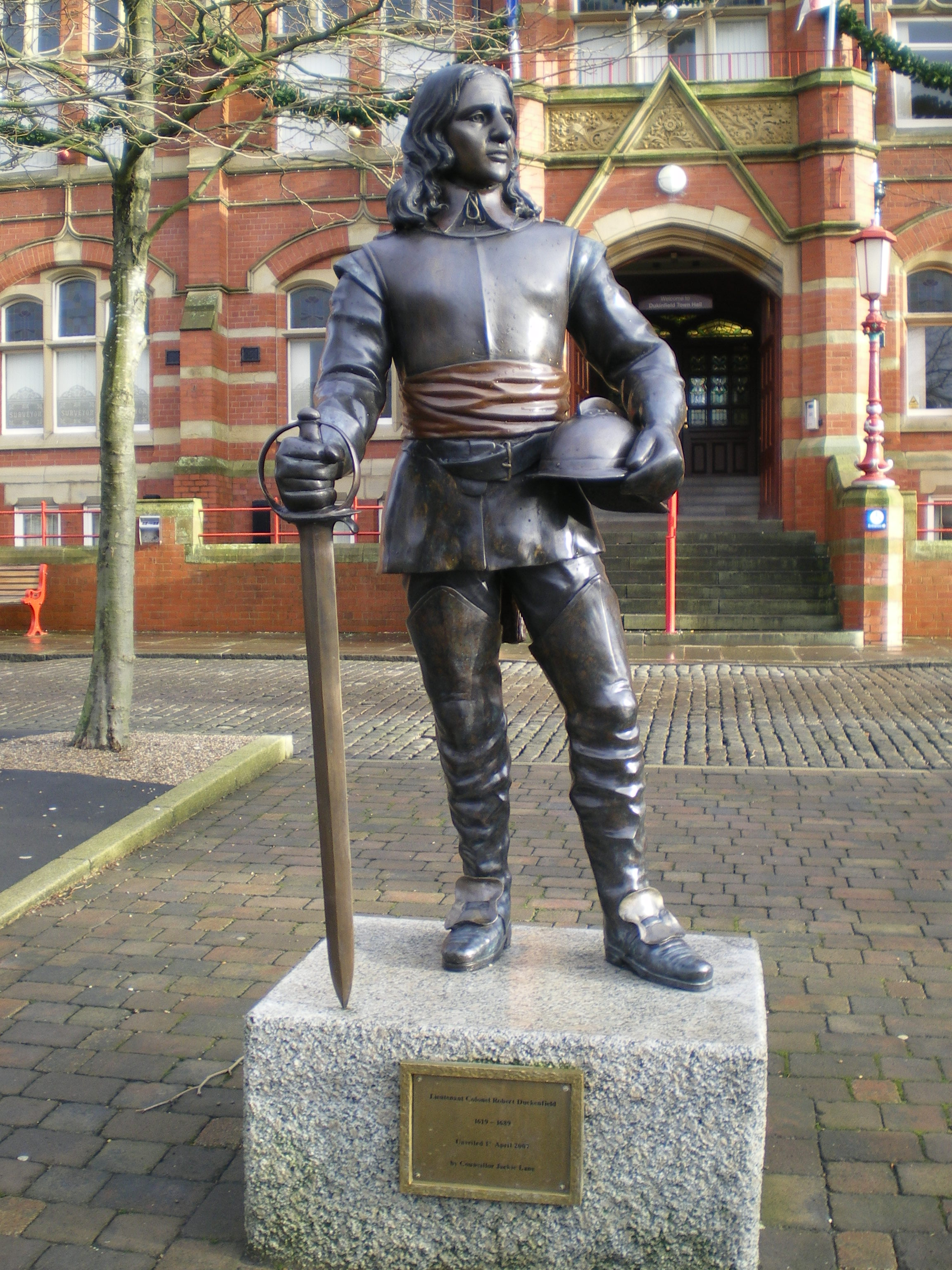
Statue of Lieutenant Colonel Robert Duckenfield outside Dukinfield Town Hall

Lieutenant Colonel Robert Duckenfield (1619–1689) was a Parliamentarian commander during the English Civil War.

== Family history ==
Robert Duckenfield came from Dukinfield in Cheshire and was born to Robert and Frances Duckenfield in 1619. The Duckenfields were a noted local family and their history in Cheshire can be traced back to the 13th century.
On 28 August 1619 he was baptised in Stockport. Robert Duckenfield married Martha, the daughter of Sir Miles Fleetwood of Hesketh in Lancashire. Their son, also called Robert, born c. 1642, was raised to a baronet.

== Civil War ==
During the Civil War, Duckenfield was appointed High Sheriff of Cheshire for six months in 1649. He also played a more active role in the Civil War as he defended Stockport Bridge against Prince Rupert and conducted the siege of Wythenshawe. In 1650, he was made the Governor of Chester. Most notably, he commanded the Parliamentary forces which captured the Isle of Man.

== Booth's rebellion ==
Towards the end of the Commonwealth, Sir George Booth led a rebellion against Richard Cromwell, the Lord Protector. Duckenfield was the principal commander who suppressed Booth's rebellion.
