= Dukinfield =

Town in Greater Manchester, England

Coordinates: 53.4739°N 2.0828°W

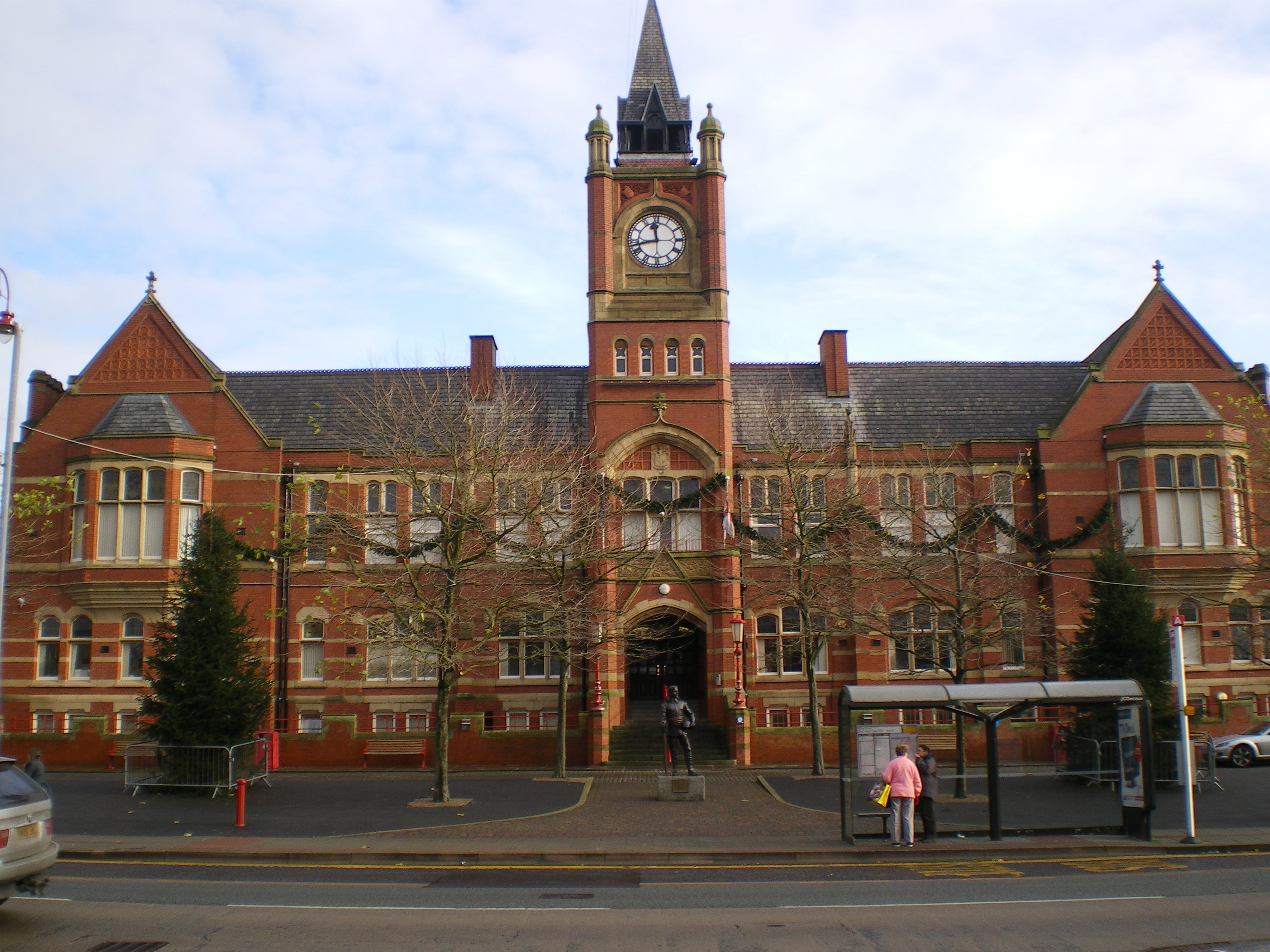
- Dukinfield Town Hall

- Location within Greater Manchester
- Population: 21,155 (built-up area, 2021)
- OS grid reference: SJ945975
  - London: 160 mi (257 km) SSE
- Metropolitan borough: Tameside
- Metropolitan county: Greater Manchester
- Region: North West
- Country: England
- Sovereign state: United Kingdom
- Post town: DUKINFIELD
- Postcode district: SK16
- Dialling code: 0161
- Police: Greater Manchester
- Fire: Greater Manchester
- Ambulance: North West
- UK Parliament: Ashton-under-Lyne; Stalybridge and Hyde

Dukinfield (/ˈdʌkɪnˌfiːld/ DUK-in-feeld; locally /ˈdʊkɪnˌfɪjəld/ DUUK-in-fi-yuhld) is a town in Tameside, Greater Manchester, England. It lies on the south bank of the river Tame opposite Ashton-under-Lyne, 6.3 miles (10.1 km) east of Manchester. At the 2021 census, the built-up area as defined by the Office for National Statistics had a population of 21,155. It formed part of the historic county boundaries of Cheshire, becoming part of Greater Manchester in 1974. The town developed as a result of the Industrial Revolution, when it became a site of coal mining and cotton manufacturing.

== History ==
=== Early history ===
The earliest evidence of human activity around Dukinfield comes from a collection of four flints from the late Neolithic / early Bronze Age. The artifacts were discovered on the site of Dukinfield Hall and have been taken as evidence of a prehistoric settlement on the site. There is no further evidence of activity in the area until the Roman period. A third century bronze Roman coin from the reign of Emperor Tetricus I was discovered in the town.

Dukinfield means "Raven of the Field" and derives from the Old English duce and feld.

Early records show the township was included in the fee of Dunham Massey. It was held by Matthew de Bramhall in about 1190, and after that by a family who took the name "De Dokenfeld". The family lived at the moated Dukinfield Old Hall, which originated from after the Norman conquest and was rebuilt in Tudor times, remaining the home of the Dukinfields till the 18th century, after which it became derelict. During the English Civil War, Colonel Robert Duckenfield of Dukinfield Hall was a noted commander in the New Model Army. The Dukinfield baronetcy was created in 1665 for Robert Dukinfield, son of Colonel Robert Dukinfield.

The Dukinfields held the manor for five centuries, until the widow of Sir William Dukinfield Daniel married John Astley in 1767 and he inherited the estate. John Astley was an artist and architect; he designed and built Dukinfield Lodge on a hill overlooking the river Tame as a new seat for the family, replacing the old wooden hall. His son Francis Dukinfield Astley succeeded him as lord of the manor in 1787; his son, Francis Dukinfield Palmer Astley, followed in 1825.

=== Industrial Revolution ===
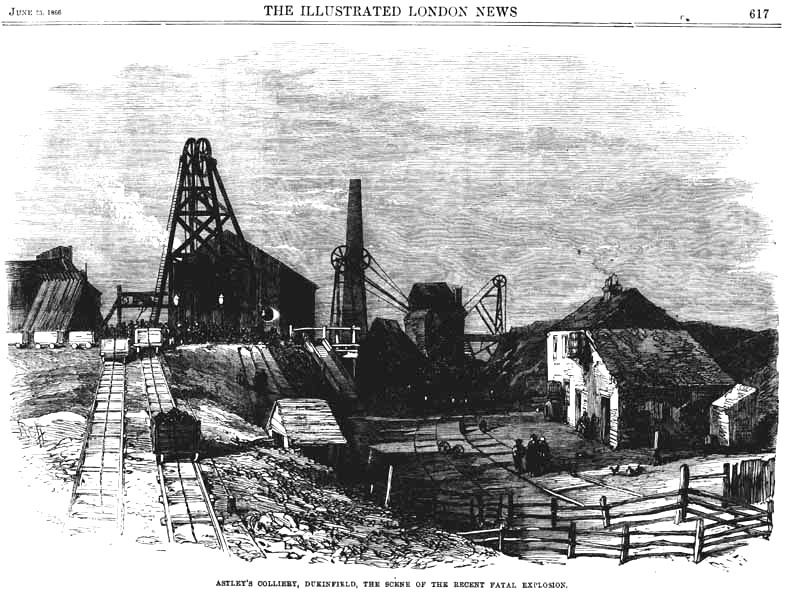
Dukinfield Colliery

Industrialisation, particularly in the cotton trade, helped shape the town, but its rapid development destroyed its former pasture and meadow land. Two cotton mills were built before 1794 and by 1825 there were seven. The industry continued to expand and, by the end of the 19th century, 14 spinning mills of varying sizes were in operation. The largest mills were built in brick during the 1890s, with four or five storeys, large windows, ornamental towers, engine houses and tall brick built chimneys; they included Tower, Tame Valley, River, Park Road and Queen Mills. Most of the cotton mills have now been demolished, but some have been preserved and converted into flats.

Coal pits exploiting the underlying coal measures to the south of the Lancashire Coalfield were a major part of Dukinfield's industrial history. One pithead was located on Birch Lane, now the site of All Saints' Catholic College, with another near the northern border with Ashton-under-Lyne. Francis Dukinfield Astley first started developing collieries in the town around 1820 and his son, Francis Dukinfield Palmer Astley, continued to develop the two most notable mines after his father's death in 1825 — Dukinfield and Astley Deep Pit — both of which suffered explosions which killed many workers:

- Dukinfield Colliery (also known as Lakes Pit or Victoria Colliery) was owned by Astley's Dukinfield Colliery Company. The colliery had two shafts, the downcast was 1,020 feet (311 m) deep to the Black mine (coal seam) and was connected to the upcast ventilation shaft. On 4 June 1867, 38 men and boys died of suffocation following an explosion caused by a faulty safety lamp and poor management.
- Astley Deep Pit, was off King's Street opposite Brownlea Avenue was developed by Astley but, by 1874, was owned by Benjamin Ashton. The colliery's downcast shaft was 2,058 feet (627 m) deep and its workings extended over a mile to the south and about 1,300 yards (1,189 m) to the north of the shaft. This colliery was reported to be at one time, the deepest coal mine in the world, at 2,100 feet (640 m) and had three shafts. On 14 April 1874, an underground gas explosion killed 54 men. After the pit closed in 1901, the shafts were filled in and left to stand for many years before being built on; it is now the site of a development of houses comprising Angel Close, Oval Drive and Silver Close.

Samuel Robinson, a Unitarian, industrialist and scholar, founded the village library in 1833 and was dubbed the "foremost promoter of education in the district" before his death in 1884. Daniel Adamson a mechanical engineer became the first chairman of the Manchester Ship Canal Company. He owned an engineering works producing Lancashire boilers at Newton Wood beside the Manchester, Sheffield and Lincolnshire Railway. He died on 13 January 1890; the Adamson Military Band, named after Adamson is based in Dukinfield. The MS&LR's successor, the Great Central Railway, moved its carriage and wagon works to Dukinfield in 1910.

Dukinfield and its surrounding towns were major centres of civil revolt during the 19th century and briefly the area was a hotbed of Chartism, the popular movement calling for universal suffrage via a People's Charter. Chartist leader, Reverend Joseph Rayner Stephens is buried in St John's Churchyard.

== Governance ==
There is one main tier of local government covering Dukinfield, at metropolitan borough level: Tameside Metropolitan Borough Council. The council is a member of the Greater Manchester Combined Authority, which is led by the directly elected Mayor of Greater Manchester. Two electoral wards for the council cover the town: Dukinfield and Dukinfield / Stalybridge.

For national representation, the Dukinfield ward lies in the Ashton-under-Lyne parliamentary constituency; the Dukinfield / Stalybridge ward lies in Stalybridge and Hyde.

=== Administrative history ===
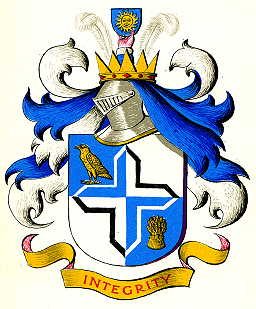
Coat of arms of the former Dukinfield Borough Council

Dukinfield was historically a township in the ancient parish of Stockport, which formed part of the Macclesfield Hundred of Cheshire. From the 17th century onwards, parishes were gradually given various civil functions under the poor laws, in addition to their original ecclesiastical functions. In some cases, including Stockport, the civil functions were exercised by each township separately rather than the parish as a whole. In 1866, the legal definition of 'parish' was changed to be the areas used for administering the poor laws and so Dukinfield became a civil parish.

In its north-eastern corner, the township included a large part of the town of Stalybridge, which rapidly developed during the industrial revolution. In 1828, a body of improvement commissioners was established to administer a newly defined Stalybridge district, which straddled the three townships of Dukinfield and Stayley in Cheshire, and Ashton-under-Lyne in Lancashire.

In 1857, the remainder of the Dukinfield township outside the Stalybridge district was made a local board district, administered by an elected local board. Later that year, the Stalybridge commissioners' district was incorporated to become a municipal borough.

Local board districts were reconstituted as urban districts under the Local Government Act 1894. The 1894 act also directed that civil parishes could no longer straddle district or borough boundaries, and so Dukinfield parish lost its territory within the borough of Stalybridge. The boundary between Dukinfield and neighbouring Ashton-under-Lyne to the north was adjusted in 1898, to follow the modern course of the river Tame; previously, the boundary had followed the more meandering pre-industrial revolution course of the river, which had been altered as various mills and urban development had been laid out along the river's banks.

Dukinfield Urban District was incorporated in 1899 to become a municipal borough. The borough council was granted a coat of arms in 1900. The council subsequently built Dukinfield Town Hall on King Street to serve as its headquarters, which was completed in 1901. The borough was expanded in 1936, gaining part of the civil parish of Matley, which was abolished.

The borough of Dukinfield was abolished in 1974 under the Local Government Act 1972. The area became part of the Metropolitan Borough of Tameside in Greater Manchester.

== Geography and geology ==
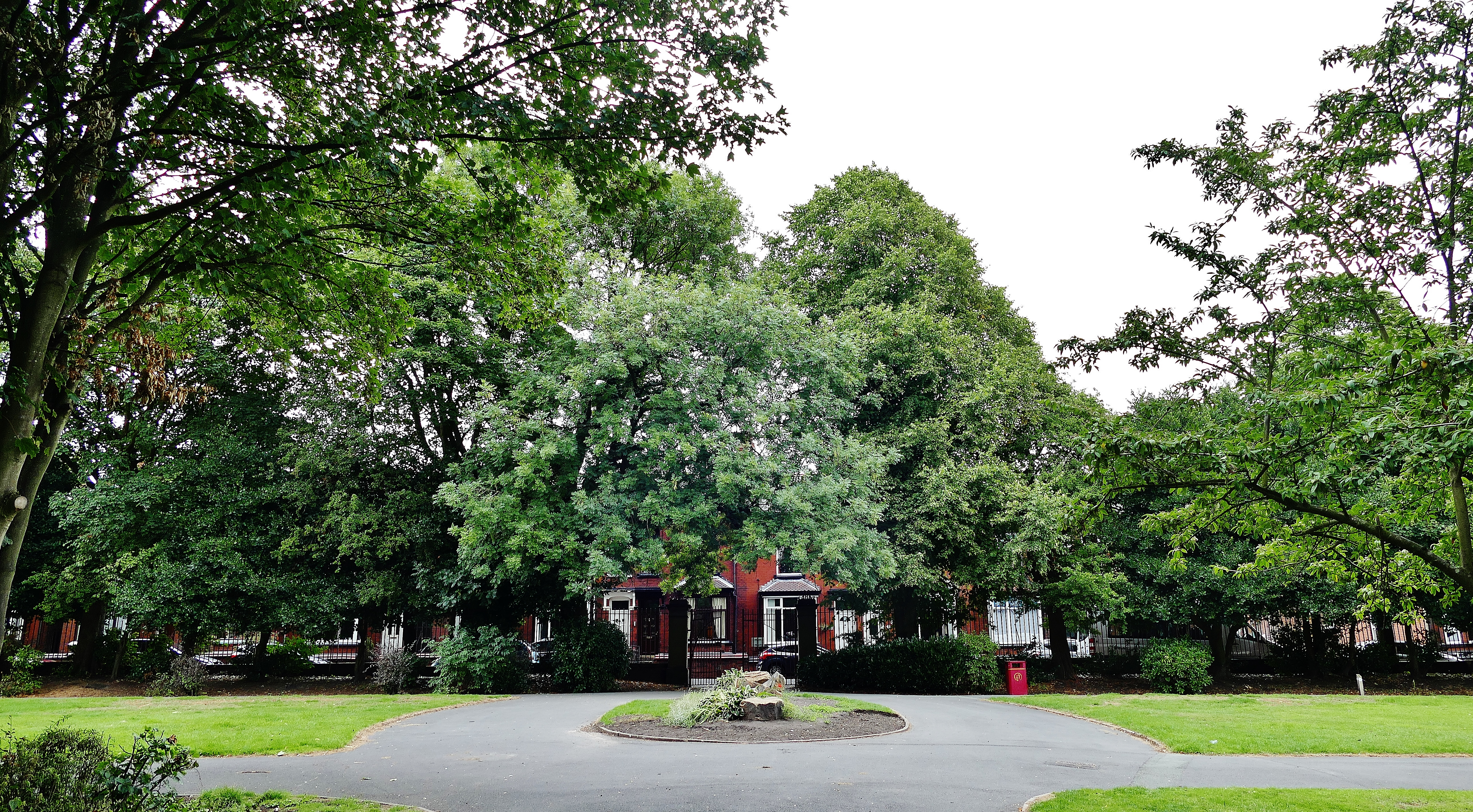
Dukinfield Park top terrace

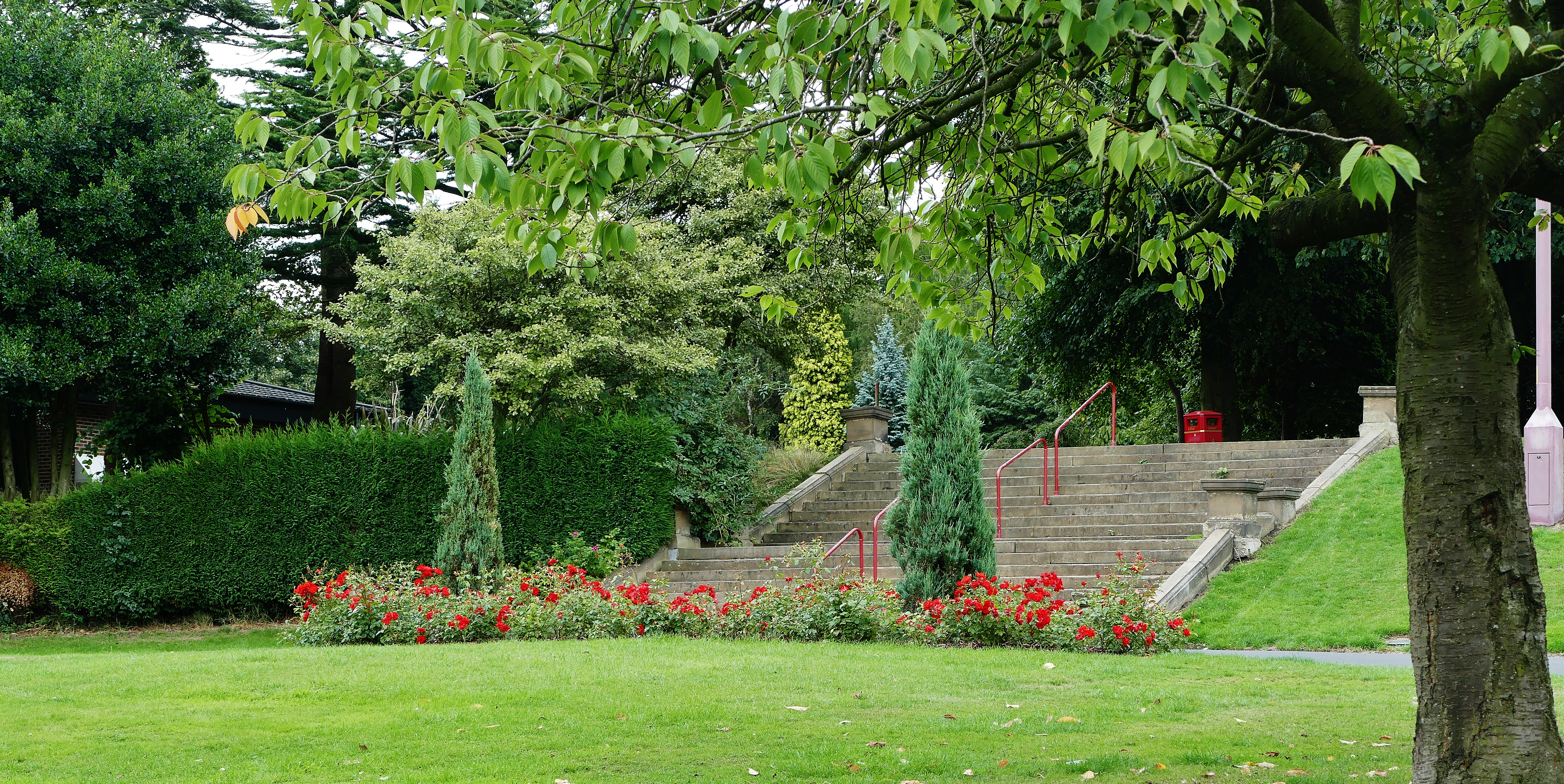
Dukinfield Park steps

Dukinfield's borders are defined to the north and west by the river Tame. The town is situated at the edge of the Cheshire Plain, where it meets the Pennines; it is the first town on the hill. The park is situated approximately a quarter of a mile from the town hall along King Street towards Hyde in the south. The park is terraced and is over 90 feet (27 m) higher at the top because of the steep rise out of the plain; the hill flattens out slightly before rising steeply again towards the east, where the library is situated.

The town hall is also at the base of the same hill with Astley Street rising steeply along its shorter southern side, before climbing some 120 feet (37 m) to the crest of the ridge. The local soil is mainly clayey with some alluvial deposits.

The underlying geology is the middle coal measures, which run north–south under Tameside. Dukinfield is situated on the site of a vast ancient lake or swamp that covered the area. This ancient lake is the reason coal is found in the area. The layers of shale and coal are laid on top of each other in bands, only around 25 feet (7.6 m) thick. The coal deposits fall away at an approximate 20-degree angle, and runs about eight miles from the base of the hill out under the plain. The coal deposits are known as the Dukinfield Marine Band and form a V-shape running out from here towards Stockport in the south and Ashton Moss in the north-east. Dukinfield had several mines, of which Astley Deep Pit had the best coal. There are many seams or mines; Dukinfield coal was known to be the best for heating and steam generation. Only a mile to the south, along Hyde Road, is another large mine, the Dewsnap Colliery, which was of a lower quality and so was not in as much demand.

The Dukinfield Marine Band outcrops in the town and continues up the hill towards the top of the ridge, around 120 feet (36.6 m) above the level of the plain where it flattens out and a third mine was situated.

=== Demography ===
Dukinfield compared
2001 UK census	Dukinfield	Tameside	England
Total population	18,885	213,043	49,138,831
White	97.3%	94.6%	90.9%
Asian	1.7%	4.0%	4.6%
Black	0.1%	0.3%	2.3%

According to the Office for National Statistics, at the time of the 2001 census, Dukinfield had a population of 18,885. The 2001 population density was 9,922 inhabitants per square mile (3,831/km^{2}), with a 100 to 93.9 female-to-male ratio.

Of those over 16 years old, 29.1% were single (never married), 42.1% married and 9.4% divorced.

Dukinfield's 8,072 households included 31.2% one-person, 36.8% married couples living together, 9.9% were co-habiting couples and 10.5% single parents with their children. Of those aged 16–74, 35.1% had no academic qualifications.

At the 2001 UK census, 79.0% of Dukinfield's residents reported themselves as Christian, 0.9% Hindu, 0.8% Muslim and 0.1% Buddhist. The census recorded 12.2% as having no religion, 0.1% had an alternative religion and 6.8% did not state their religion.

==== Population change ====
Population growth in Dukinfield since 1801
Year	1801	1811	1821	1831	1841	1851	1861	1871	1881	1891	1901	1911	1921	1931	1939	1951	1961	1971	2001	2011
Population	1,737	3,053	5,096	14,681	22,394	26,418	15,024	14,085	16,942	17,385	18,929	19,422	19,509	19,311	17,749	18,451	17,316	17,302	17,917	22,938

Dukinfield grew from a small village, just south of Ashton-under-Lyne, with open land to the south and east, the gap between it and the surrounding towns of Hyde and Matley being a semicircle around 1.5 miles (2.4 km) wide, to fill the gap entirely by the late 1940s. In its early days from 1801 and previously, the population was small but boomed during the days of the cotton industry and later the coal industry with its major rail junction adding to its prosperity and growth.

The industries which sustained it died out by the turn of the 1900s, leaving only the Daniel Adamson Ltd works, but it managed to maintain its population and has only declined by 2000 since 1921. One reason is that it has a central location on the main road from Stockport to Ashton and is within easy commuting distance of Manchester.

== Economy ==
Dukinfield compared
2001 UK Census	Dukinfield	Tameside	England
Population of working age	13,621	151,445	35,532,091
Full-time employment	45.6%	43.5%	40.8%
Part-time employment	11.8%	11.9%	11.8%
Self employed	5.9%	6.5%	8.3%
Unemployed	3.2%	3.3%	3.3%
Retired	13.1%	13.3%	13.5%

According to the 2001 UK census, the industry of employment of residents of Dukinfield aged 16–74 was: 24.4% manufacturing, 19.3% retail and wholesale, 10.0% health and social work, 9.5% property and business services, 7.2% construction, 6.5% transport and communications, 5.7% education, 4.7% public administration, 4.4% finance, 3.4% hotels and restaurants, 1.0% energy and water supply, 0.3% agriculture, 0.1% mining and 3.6% other.

Compared with national figures, the town had a relatively high proportion of people working in manufacturing and low levels of people working in agriculture, public administration and education. The census recorded the economic activity of residents aged 16–74, 2.1% students were with jobs, 2.8% students without jobs, 4.9% looking after home or family, 7.9% permanently sick or disabled, and 2.7% economically inactive for other reasons.

== Education ==
There are numerous primary schools and nurseries in the town. There are secondary schools, but no dedicated facility in Dukinfield for further education; the nearest establishment is Tameside College in Ashton and Hyde.

All Saints Catholic College provides education for 16- to 18-year-olds. Since 1998, the sixth form facility has been provided for in a purpose-built extension to the main school.

== Religion ==
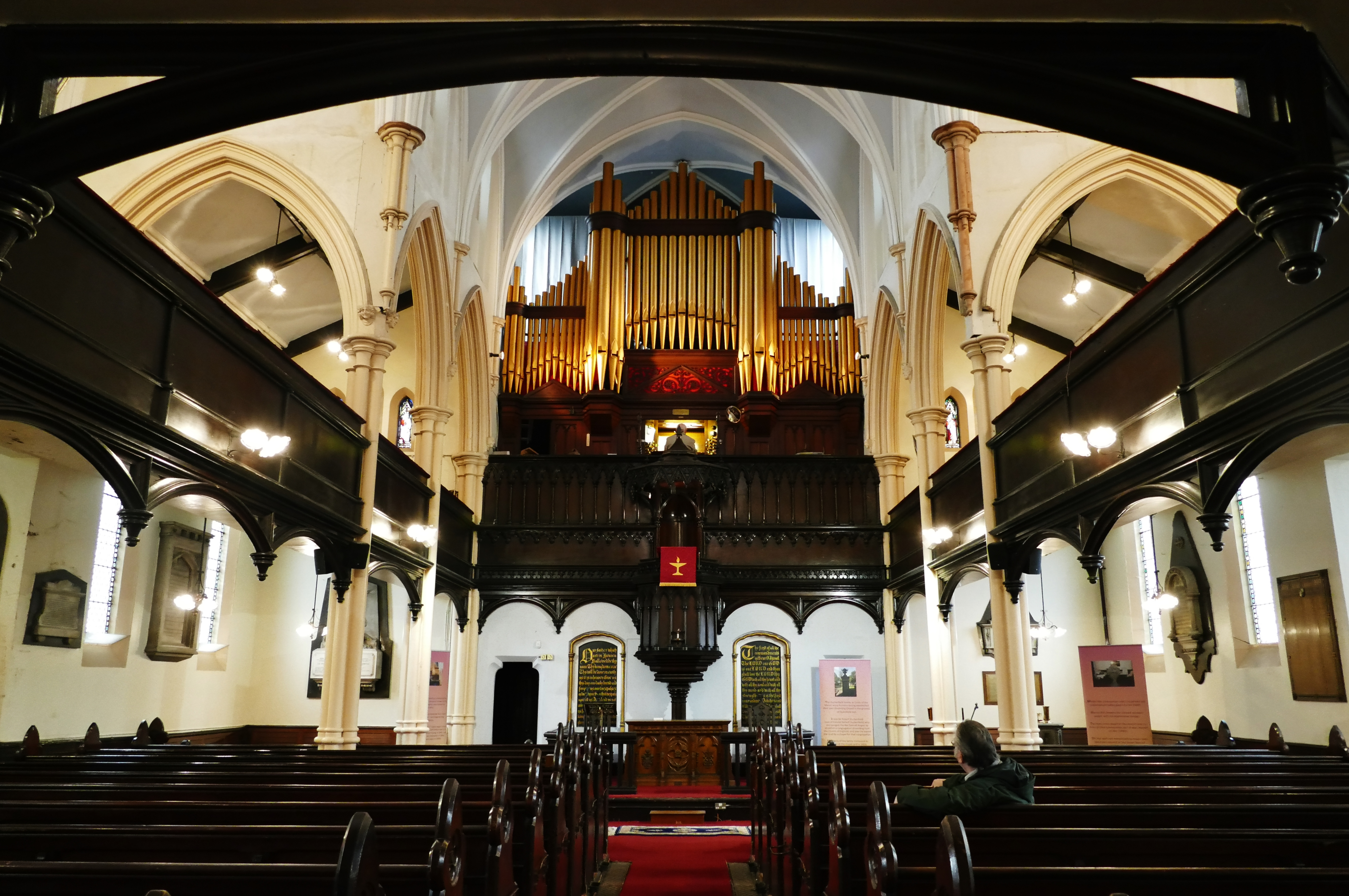
Old Chapel interior

The parish church dedicated to St. John the Evangelist is a Commissioners' church built between 1840 and 1841 and consecrated the following year. A second parish was formed in 1846 and its church dedicated to St Mark was begun in 1847.

A number of Protestant and Catholic churches are based in the municipality, with the nearest mosque being in Ashton-under-Lyne, a short distance to the north of the town.

The Moravian Church began their work in Dukinfield in 1751, building a settlement on Old Road where Moravian Close now is situated. God's Acre burial ground is extant in Moravian Close; it was closed to further burials in 1973, when the Moravians moved to Yew Tree Lane where the church is now located.

== Landmarks ==
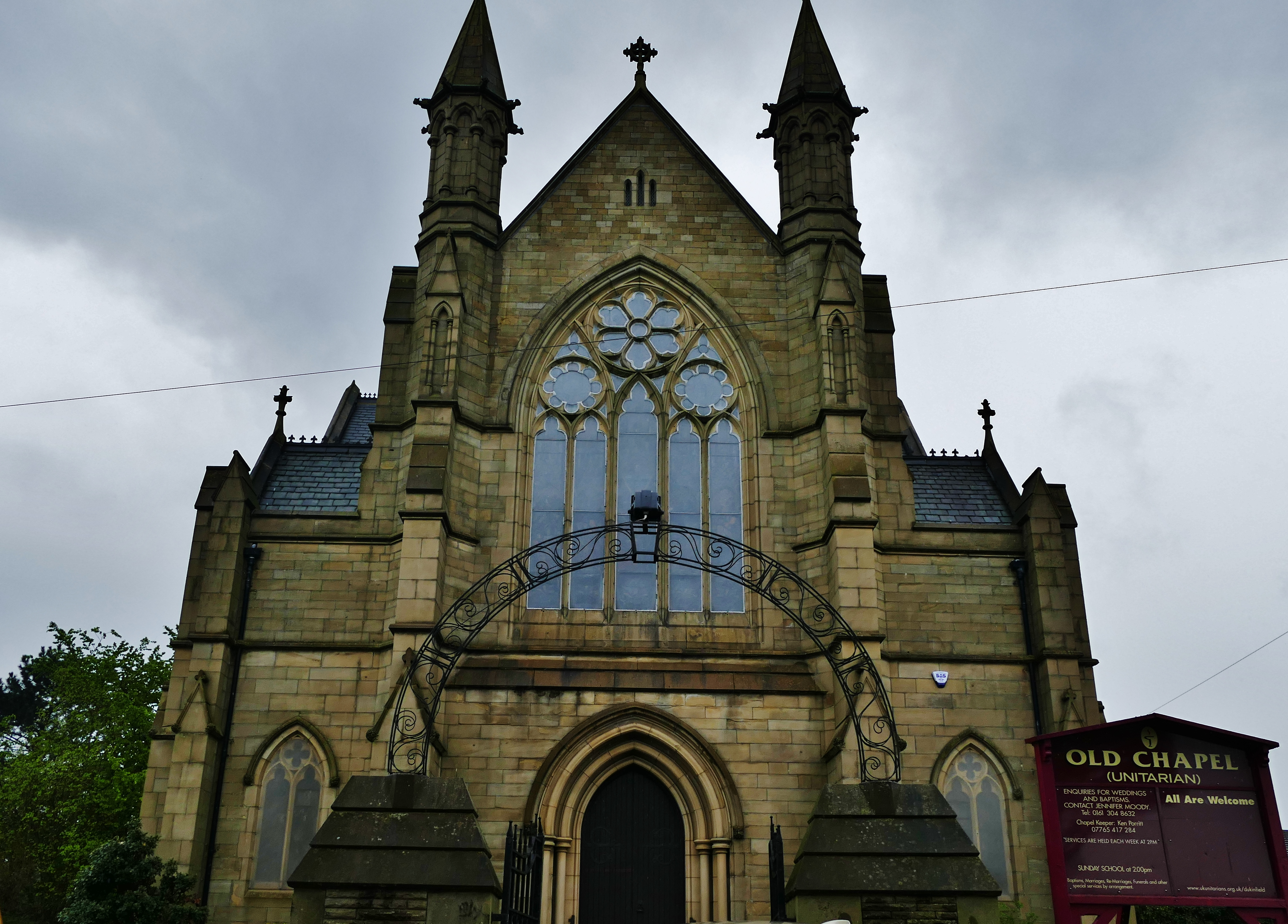
Old Chapel, at the top of Crescent Road, next to the Top Astley

Old Hall Chapel is a historic church that claims to be the first independent church of the 17th century. Built in the late 15th century, it is now partially derelict following a fire in the 1970s that destroyed much of the roof's superstructure. It is a Grade II* listed building.

Dukinfield Old Chapel was constructed between 1840 and 1841 to the designs of Robert Tattersall, with the west front refaced by Thomas Worthington in the early 1890s. It is a Grade II* listed building.

Dukinfield Town Hall was built in the late 1890s and opened in 1901. It was funded following the creation of the Borough of Dukinfield. The adjoining park was laid out at the same time and cost a similar amount to the town hall. There is an 80-foot (24 m) difference in level between the lower end of King Street and the rear of the park, marking the first rise from the Cheshire Plain; on a clear day, it is possible to stand at the top of the steps and see Manchester city centre. The building is listed at Grade II.

== Public services ==
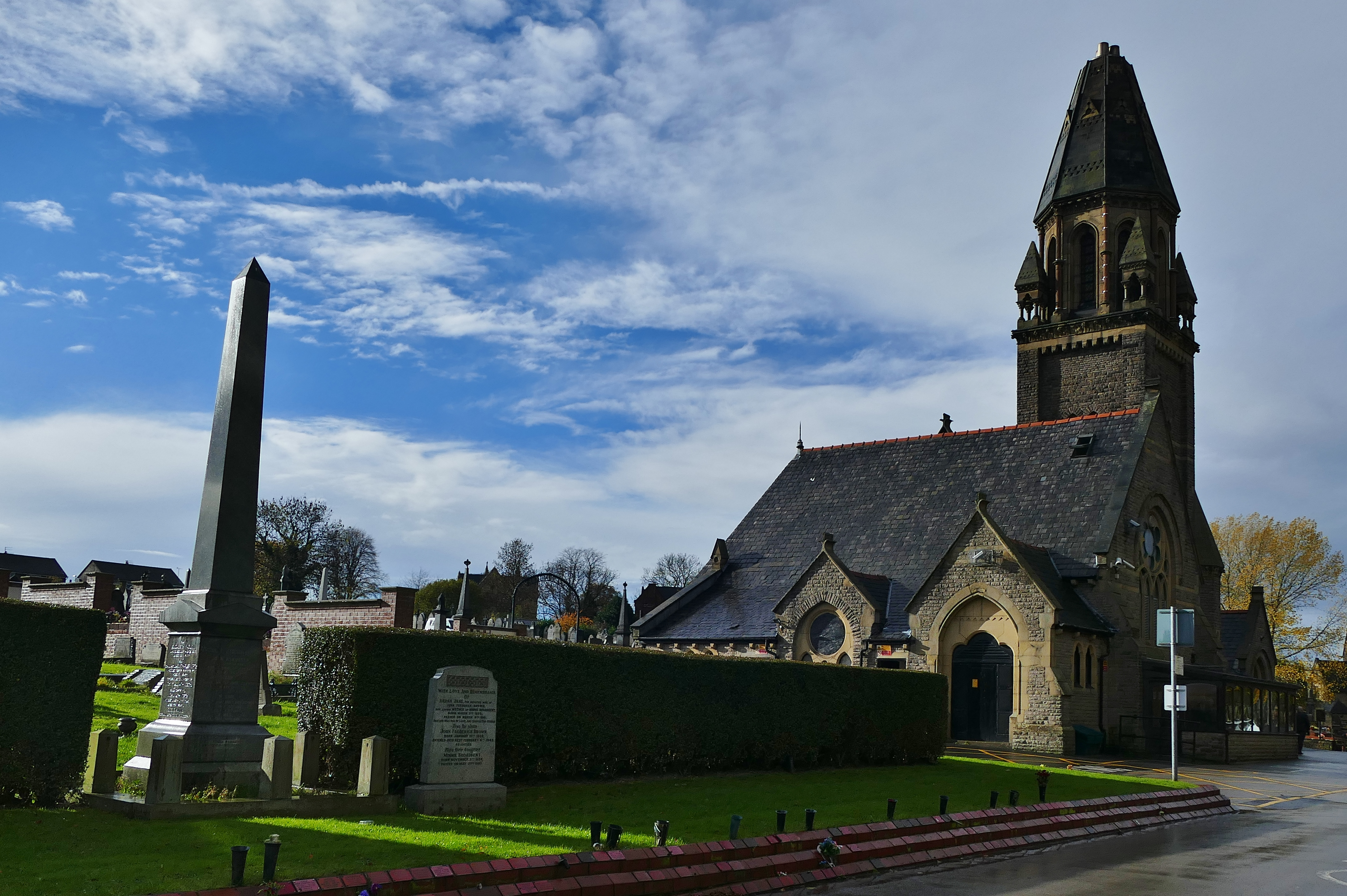
Dukinfield Crematorium exterior

The town hall provides some limited civic facilities, including a police station and registry office, with the majority of local administration being based at Tameside Council's headquarters in Ashton.

Dukinfield has a public library which is situated in Concord Way. There is a park, around a quarter-mile from the town hall, providing gardens, a play area and leisure facilities.

A public swimming pool is now closed and has been turned into a fitness centre with an indoor running track. It is available as part of the borough facilities offered by Tameside Sport, as well as two full-size sports pitches which are currently used by the town's rugby and football teams.

Rayner Stephens High School provides artificial multi-sports pitches, which can be reserved for use by the general public outside school hours.

== Transport ==
Public transport is co-ordinated by Transport for Greater Manchester.

Bus services in the area are provided predominantly by Stagecoach Manchester and First Greater Manchester; routes connect the town with Ashton, Manchester Piccadilly Gardens, Hyde and Stockport.

Dukinfield Central railway station provided local and national rail services, until it was closed in 1959. The nearest stations are now Stalybridge and Ashton-under-Lyne for Northern Trains services to Manchester Victoria, Wigan Wallgate and Southport.

The East Manchester Line's eastern terminus of the second-generation tramway, Manchester Metrolink, terminates at nearby Ashton for connections to the city centre, via Droylsden. A tram network operated by the SHMD Joint Board ran lines through Dukinfield from 1904 to 1945, until their replacement by buses.

Dukinfield Junction is a canal junction, which is the meeting point of the Peak Forest, Ashton and Huddersfield Narrow Canals.

== Media ==
Local news and television programmes are provided by BBC North West and ITV Granada. Television signals are received from the Winter Hill TV transmitter.

Local radio stations are:

- BBC Radio Manchester on 95.1 FM
- Capital Manchester and Lancashire on 102.0 FM
- Greatest Hits Radio Manchester & The North West on 96.2 FM
- Heart North West on 105.4 FM
- Smooth North West on 100.4 FM
- Tameside Radio, a community-based station which broadcasts from the town on 103.6 FM.

The local newspaper is the Tameside Reporter, which is published on Thursdays.

== Sport ==
Dukinfield Cricket Club, founded in 1870, is a member of the Lancashire County League.

Dukinfield Rugby Union Football Club currently plays in the South Lancashire & Cheshire 2 League of the Northern Division. The club plays its home games at Blocksages Playing Fields and is one of the oldest rugby teams from the historic county of Cheshire, having been founded in 1880. During the late 1990s and early 2000s, Mike Ford was head coach gaining 2 league promotions in 3 seasons.

Dukinfield Town AFC, founded in 1948, plays in the Bridgewater Office Supplies Manchester League and has a ground at Blocksage's Playing Fields, Birch Lane, next to Dukinfield Rugby Club. Dukinfield Town were winners of the Manchester Senior Cup in 1971, the final was played at Maine Road. Manchester Senior Cup archive.

It is the home of Dukinfield Central Bowling Club, which plays in the Tameside Men's Crown Green Bowling League and won the premier division title six times in the 2010s.

== Notable people ==
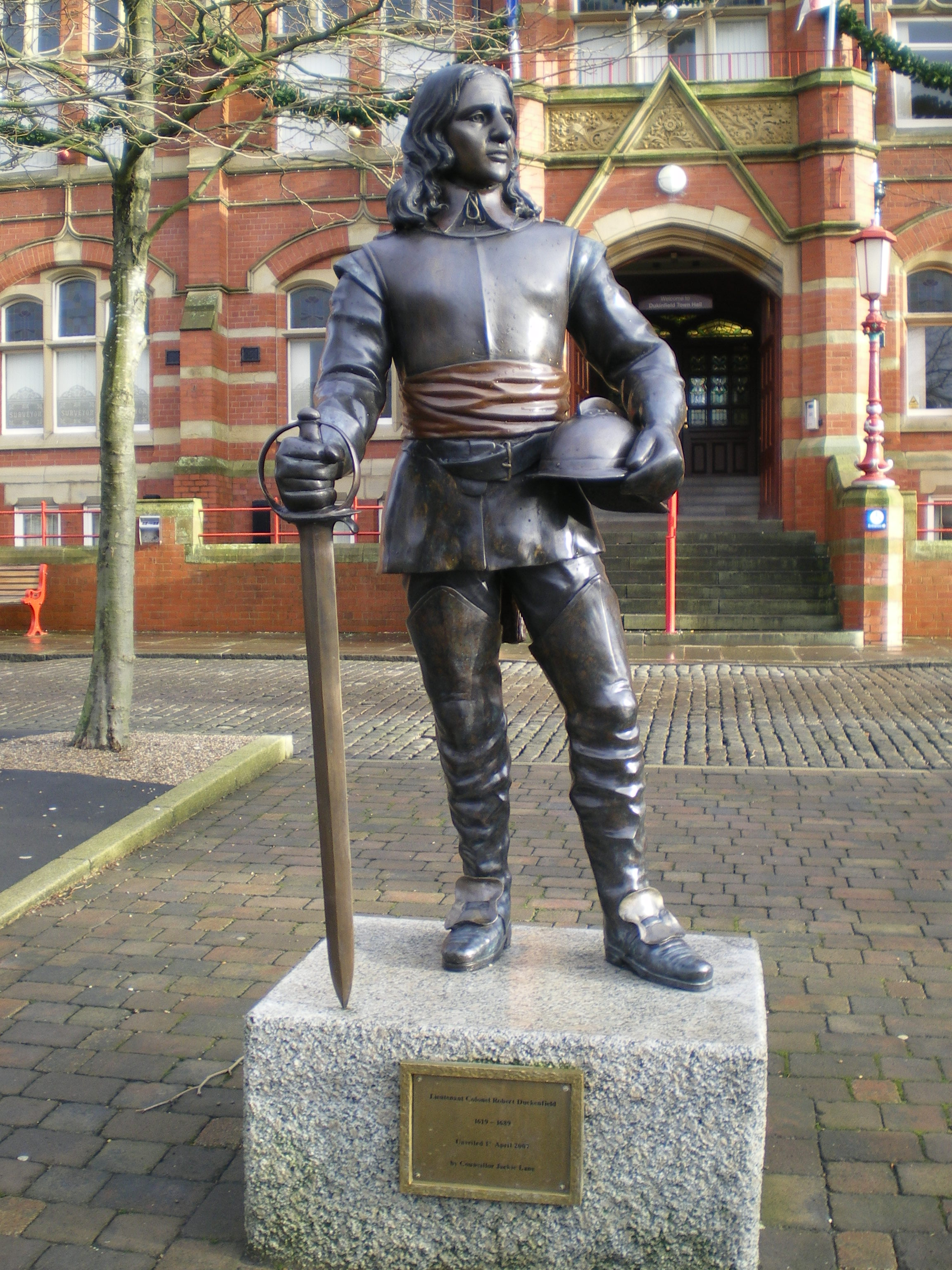
Lt.Col Robert Duckenfield outside Dukinfield Town Hall

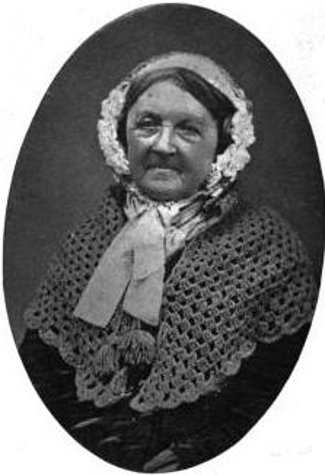
Mary Moffat, 1885

- Lt.Col Robert Duckenfield (1619–89), Roundhead commander during the English Civil War
- Samuel Robinson (1794–1884), unitarian, industrialist and scholar of the Persian language who founded the Dukinfield Village Library in 1833
- Mary Moffat (1795–1871), missionary who became a role model for women involved in missionary work
- William John Battersby (1839–1915), British hat manufacturer, of Battersby Hats
- Sir Roderick Jones (1877–1962), journalist and news agency manager, head of Reuters
- Kathy Staff (1928–2008), actress, portrayed Nora Batty in Last of the Summer Wine
- Ronnie Hazlehurst (1928–2007), composer, conductor and arranger of TV and radio music, the BBC Light Entertainment Musical Director
- Dennis Walsh (1933–2005), astronomer, radio astronomer and optical astronomer
- John Normington (1937–2007), actor, worked on TV, and a member of the Royal Shakespeare Company
- Shirley Stelfox (1941–2015), actress, portrayed Edna Birch in the soap opera Emmerdale
- Peter Daszak (born c.1965), zoologist, consultant and expert on disease ecology, in particular on zoonosis.

=== Sport ===
- Albert Lawton (1879–1955), cricketer who played 182 first-class cricket games
- Buddy Oldfield (1911–96), cricketer with Lancashire and Northamptonshire, played 322 first-class cricket games
- George Forbes (1914–64), footballer who played 177 games for Barrow
- Cyril Cartwright (1924–2015), cyclist who held national records on the track and on the road
- Tony Brooks (1932–2022), 1950s Formula One driver with six Grand Prix victories.

== Twin town ==
- Champagnole, in Jura, France, has been the twin town of Dukinfield since 1958.

== See also ==
- Listed buildings in Dukinfield.
