= Astley Deep Pit disaster =

1874 mining accident in Cheshire, England

Coordinates: 53°28′N 2°05′W

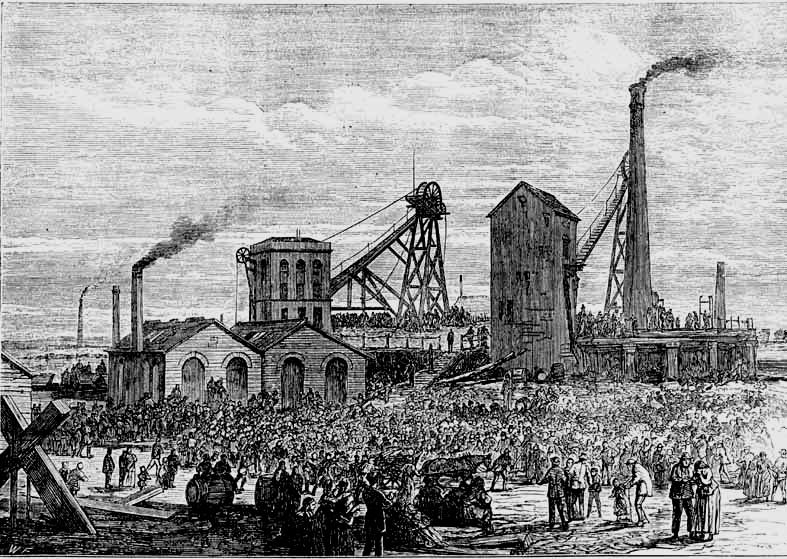
Astley Deep Pit disaster 1874 from the Illustrated London News

The Astley Deep Pit disaster was a mining accident at the Astley Deep Pit, in Dukinfield, Greater Manchester, England, that took place on 14 April 1874, killing 54 men and boys. Astley Deep Pit was a coal mine started around 1845 to work the seam of coal known as the "Lancashire Black Mine". When finished, it was supposedly the deepest coal mine in Britain and cost £100,000 to sink.

== Accidents ==
There were a number of fatal accidents at the colliery:-

15 July 1855 - Four men were being wound out of the mine when they were thrown over the headstocks (the machinery at the top of the shaft which brings the cage up and down the shaft). Nine men were killed in the incident.

25 March 1857 - A falling stone killed a worker, Benjamin Rowson, and in 1862 a second incident killed another miner, but the man's name is not known.

8 March 1870 - An explosion in the south side of the pit resulted in national notoriety. 200 men were "benumbed" (stunned and deafened), 2 badly injured and 9 men killed. This incident was mentioned in the House of Commons on 21 April 1874, after the "deep pit disaster". Mr MacDonald called for a "Return of all the lives lost in the Astley Deep Pit, Dukinfield, with cause of the loss of life and date of the same; and, Copy of the opinion of the Inspector of the district, Mr. Wynne, on the management and state of ventilation of the Mine at the time of explosion on the 8th day of March 1870."

14 April 1874 - An explosion caused the roof of a tunnel to cave in and demolished several tunnels in the "Black mine" (coal seam) killing 51 men and boys and injuring 91.

== The Astley Deep Pit Disaster ==
=== Background ===
At this time in mining history, safety was of little concern to employers and staff. Explosions and cave-ins were considered as risks of the mining profession. Although the Mines Regulations Act had been passed in 1873, change was not quick enough throughout the coal industry. Coal was a nationally important commodity and it was known that some pits produced from 1,200 to 1,700 tons of coal a day. It was calculated that the national output of coal in 1881 was 154,184,300 tons and that the industry employed nearly 500,000 people. In the first year after the Act was passed, 1873, it was reported that deaths had fallen to their lowest numbers ever at 100, but of the 63 added deaths in 1874, Astley Deep pit was responsible for 53. At the time Astley Deep Pit was the deepest coal mine in Britain and possibly the world, at 686.5 yards or 2060 feet at the time it opened in 1858, although one shaft was later sunk to a depth of 717 yards, or 2151 feet. This meant that the temperature at the bottom of the mine was high, gaining about one degree Fahrenheit for every 60 feet descended. The mine had taken 12 years to dig and was reported to have cost the owner, Francis Dukinfield Palmer Astley, over £100,000, and the site employed around 400 people working in shifts 24 hours a day.

The mine was sunk to the "Lancashire Black mine", a thick seam of coal. Coal from this seam was highly sought after and was the most expensive, thus returning the highest profits for the owners. In 1865 a report listing the price of coal for 1860 where the highest prices for House and Best coal were from Derbyshire and Newcastle, at 9 shillings a ton, the average for small coals (other coals seams) was around 4 shillings. The report also goes on to say
"The Dukinfield Deep Pit was undertaken to follow the celebrated Lancashire "Black Mine," a four feet seam of the finest coal, selling for 10s. per ton at the pit's mouth, the small coal returning 5s. 6d. per ton."

As well as the "Black Mine", a second seam of coal was mined, the Dukinfield Marine Band. This coal seam consisted of coal rich in fossils, Cephalopods (Aviculopecten papyraceous, A. fibrillosus, A. Cairnsii & Turitella sp.), species of shellfish. This coal burned fiercely giving a high temperature which was perfect for powering the steam engines, mills and trains of the time.

=== The disaster ===
The accident was started by a roof collapse in a tunnel in the Black mine about 70 feet from the bottom of the "downcast" shaft. This shaft was the main access for both miners descending to work at the coal face and for equipment. The tunnel was known as the Half Moon Tunnel, and was by mining standards, quite large at around 25 feet long and 40 feet wide. The Half Moon Tunnel had been prone to problems after it had caught fire in a previous incident, and regular falls of stone and earth were reported. Miners and workers were sent to shore the roof of the tunnel up, and began working on it with hand tools and reportedly a steam engine. The roof suffered a complete collapse. This collapse was, in itself, not a great cause for concern as it would have not been too difficult for the remaining workers to dig out and free the miners, although it would have taken several hours.

The collapsing roof released a large amount of firedamp, a naturally occurring flammable gas, which frequently caused explosions as it had in the previous accident of 1870. Unfortunately there were several miners nearby who were using a naked flame. Davy lamps and other safety lights had been available since 1815 but were not readily available for the miners who were expected to buy their own and it was common practice for open lanterns to be used. The resulting explosions collapsed further shafts after setting fire to the support beams and caused the deaths of the 54 men.

The report to the House of Commons states that it may have also been caused by a blocking of the ventilation shafts, preventing any gasses from escaping and so making the mine at extreme risk of explosion.

=== Aftermath ===
The New York Times reported that the fire was "still burning fiercely" on 16 April, two days after the explosion. The event caused massive upset in the town, as the men were all buried locally in the following week. The miners union helped the families out, and a memorial to commemorate the men that had died was erected. Its location is unknown. There was a coroners inquest before the funerals were heard and notably the details of the mine inspector tell that there were two present, Mr Wynne and Mr Bell, the government Inspector of mines. The report from the Manchester Guardian states that one Mr George Newton had sold his quarter share in the mine to Mr Ashton, but it does not go on to say what happened nor what measures were taken, if any, against Mr Ashton who would appear to have owned one half the share in the mine.

The debate over mining accidents continued and hearings in the House of Commons instigated by Mr Macdonald were heard in a debate on 21 June 1878. The notes also included a list of accidents and their causes heard in evidence by a jury. The jury noted these statements concerning Astley Deep pit.

Of the 1870 accident - "We are of opinion that Elijah Swain is not competent to have the sole management of such a mine as this. The persons have been killed by want of good management.--The Jury."

Of the Deep pit disaster of 1874 - "That the primary cause of the explosion was the blocking up of the mouthing leading to the smithy mines. That this was an act of gross ignorance or a culpable negligence. The jury consider that there is distinct evidence as to the employment of incompetent persons and placing them in authority. The jury desire to express their strong opinion that the present system of inspection is inadequate.--The Jury."

A Blue Plaque was placed by Tameside Metropolitan Borough council to commemorate the accident and the men that died, and is to be found in Woodbury Crescent, Dukinfield. The plaque reads "A previously burnt tunnel was temporarily being repaired when the roof collapsed and pockets of unknown gas were ignited by open flame lamps."

== Closure ==
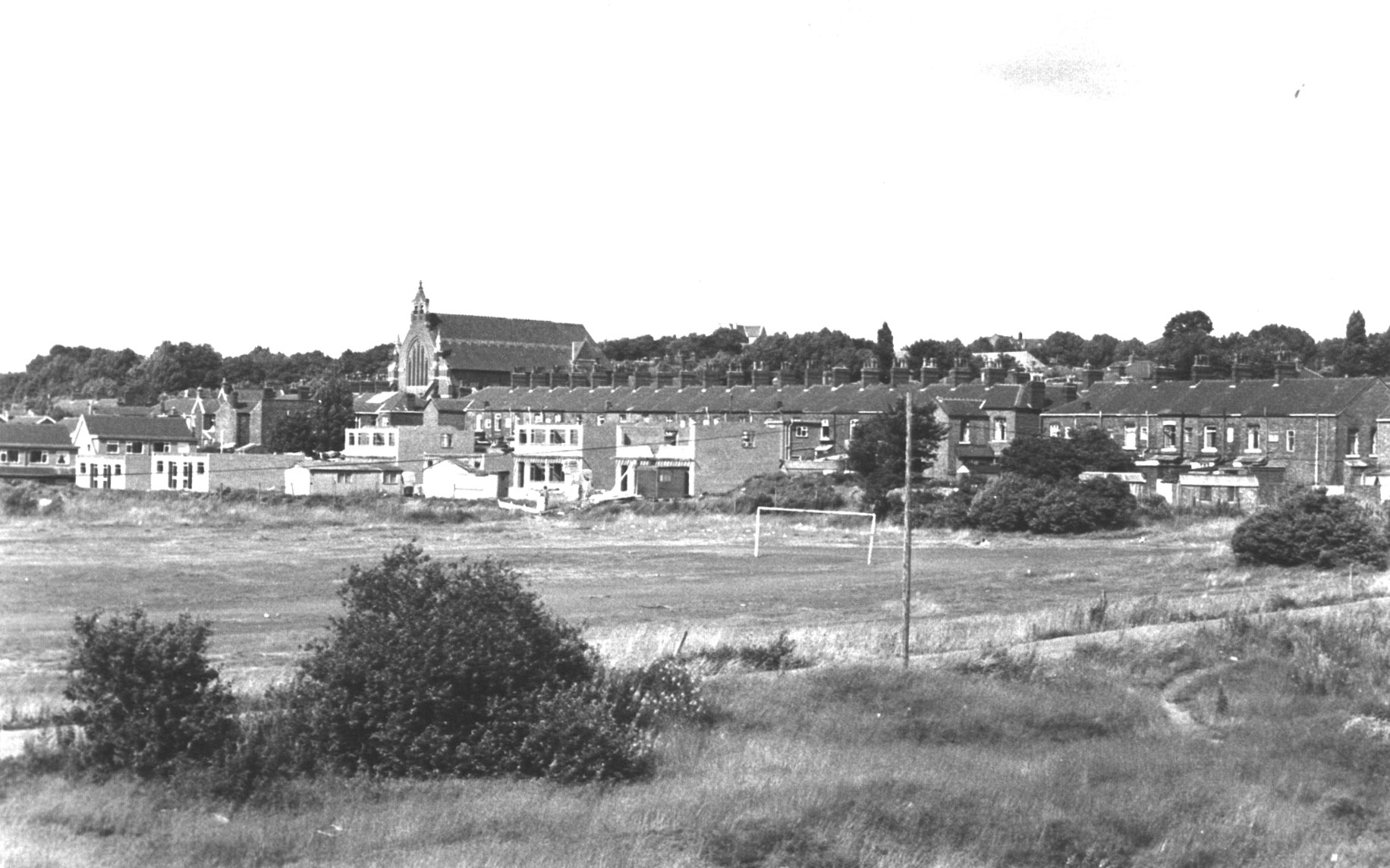
_{Site in 1978 as building work starts on houses}

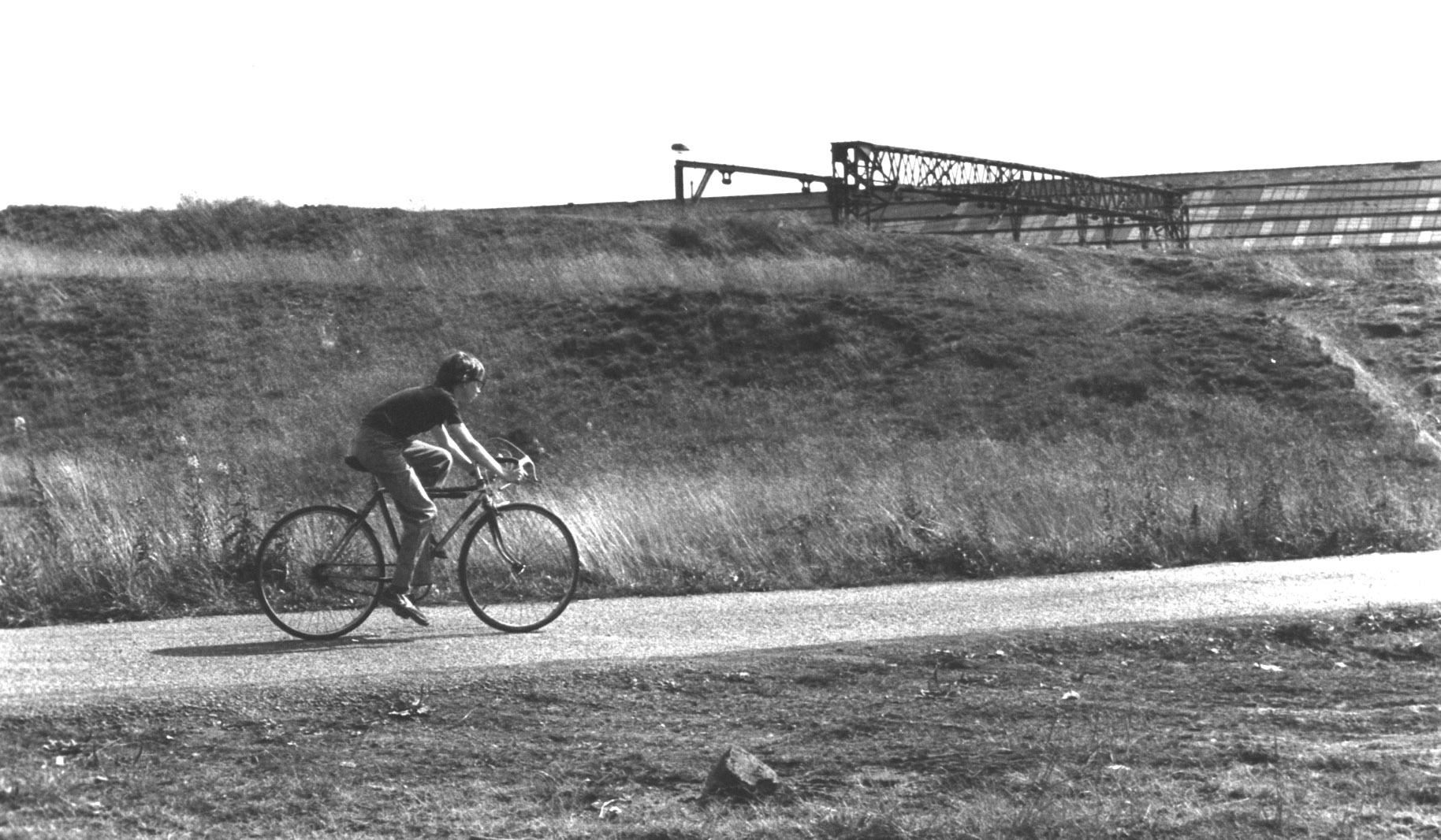
_{The only remaining sign of activity of the mine}

The mine closed in 1901, after 43 years of a promised 100 years of production. The only signs that it existed were the "slag heap", which was still there until it was bulldozed flat in the 1970s, a pond left there from before the time of the mine that had been shown on a survey map in 1850, and three fences around each of the shaft caps.
The site was used as a football pitch, although it was a cinder pitch as no grass was laid and nothing grew there due to the massive deposits of waste. The three mine shafts were filled with concrete in the 1980s and left for several years until built upon. The colliery site is now under the roads of Ashbridge Drive, Kingsbridge Drive and Kentwell Close.
