= Lilian Barker =

British schoolteacher, prison governor

Dame Lilian Barker DBE JP
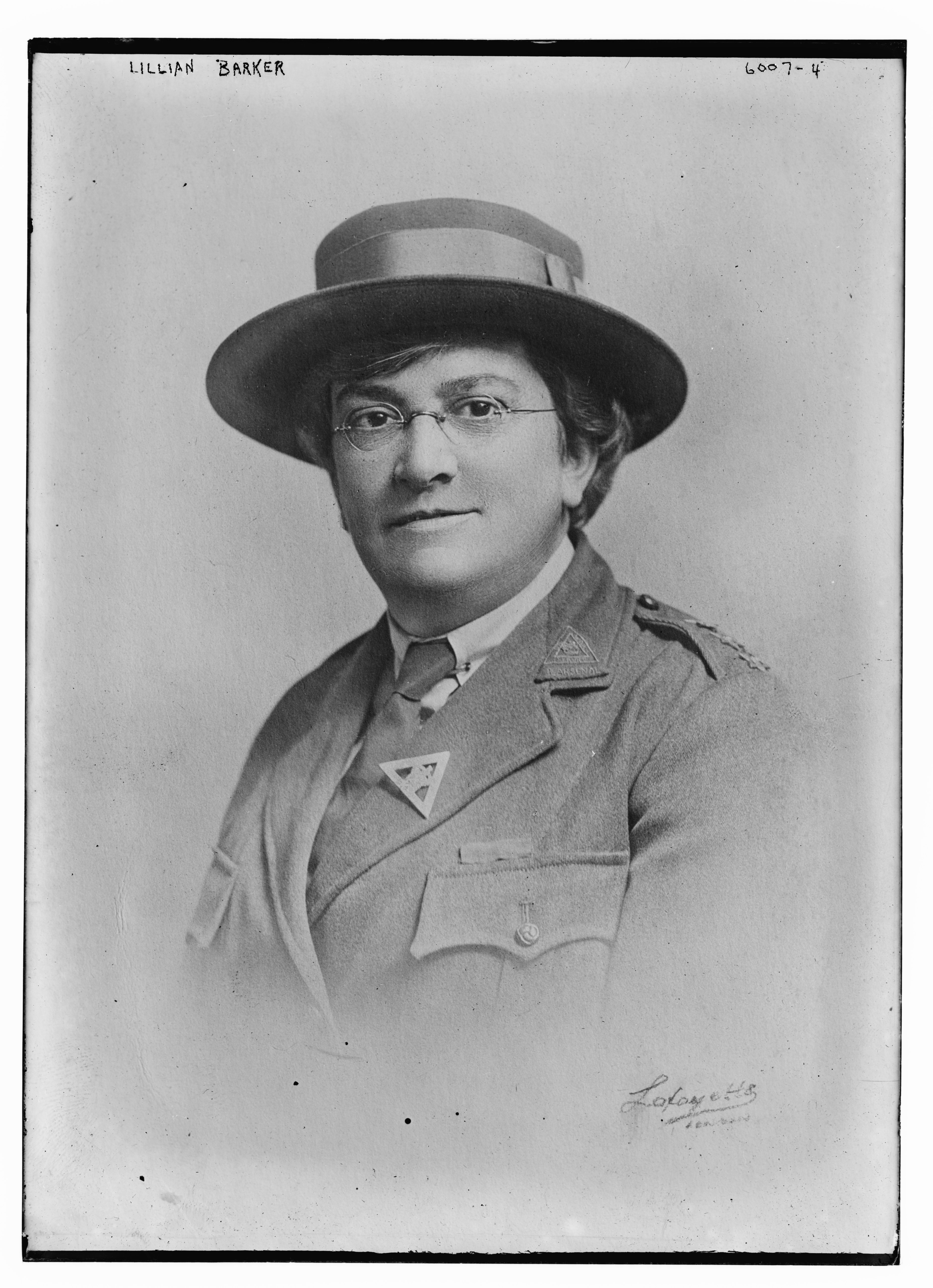
- Born: 21 February 1874; Islington, London, England
- Died: 21 May 1955 (aged 81); Kingsbridge, Devon, England
- Education: Whitelands College
- Occupation(s): schoolteacher, prison governor and assistant prison commissioner
- Years active: c. 1890s–1943
- Known for: being the first British woman to be appointed assistant prison commissioner

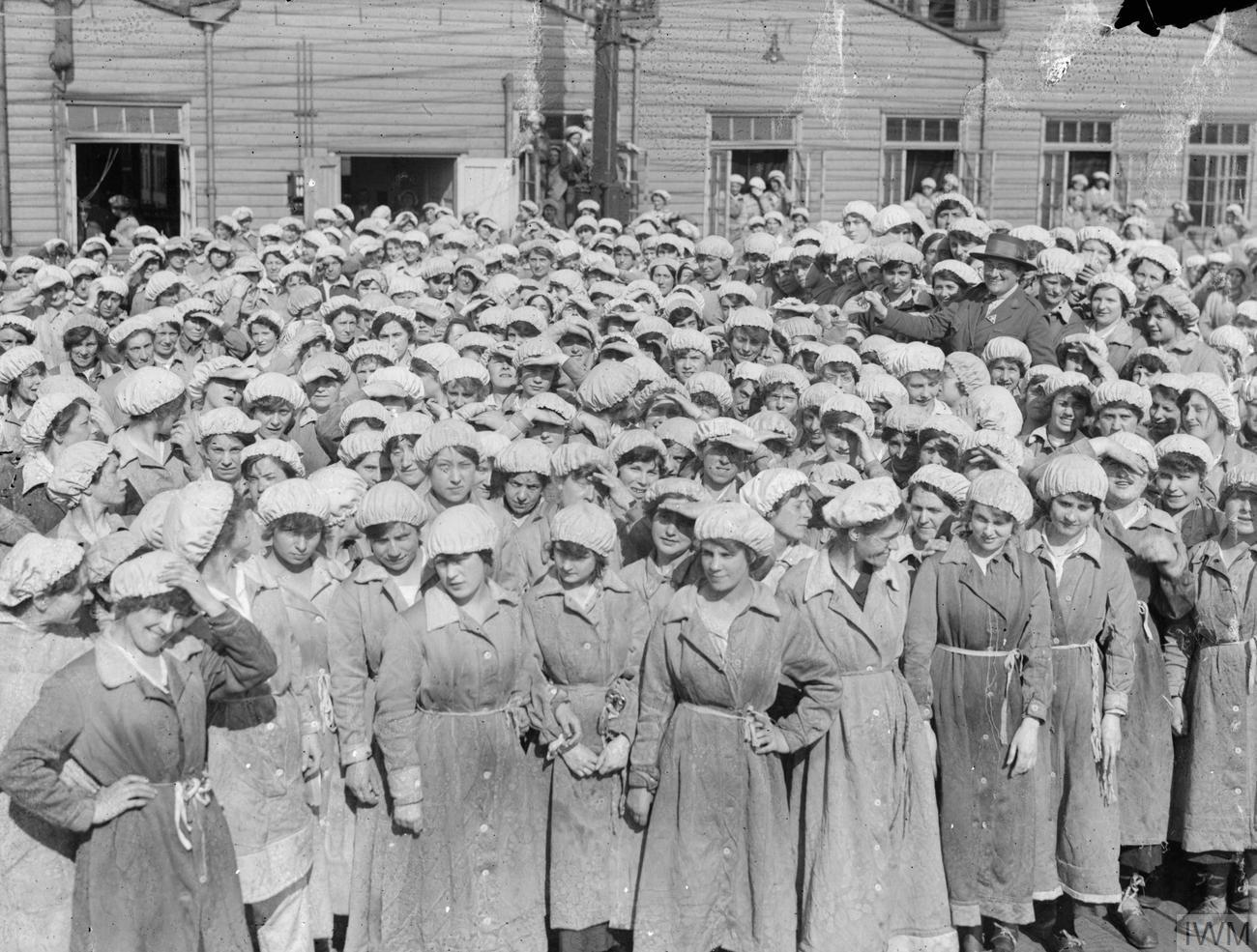
Lilian Barker, right centre, surrounded by some of her women workers from the 'danger buildings' at Woolwich Arsenal, May 1918

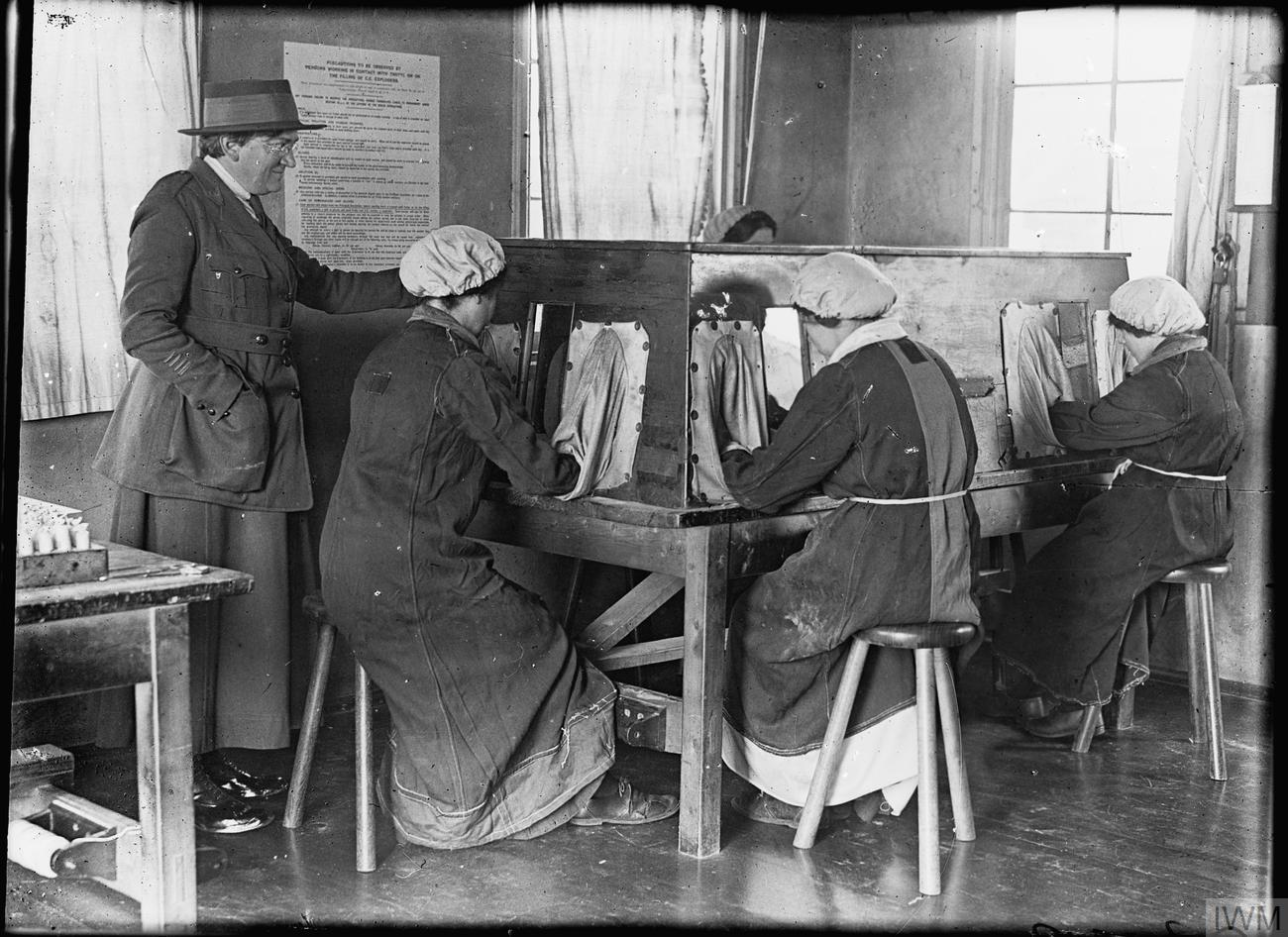
Lilian Barker, left, supervises a group of female munitions workers using primitive remote handling equipment to work with TNT explosives at Woolwich Arsenal, May 1918

Dame Lilian Charlotte Barker, DBE, JP (21 February 1874 – 21 May 1955) was a British schoolteacher, prison governor and assistant prison commissioner. She was the first British woman to be appointed assistant prison commissioner and her work provided the basis for the modern day humanitarian prison system for female correctional facilities in Great Britain.

== Early life ==
Born in Islington, Barker and grew up in Kentish Town and was educated in the local primary school system. She was one of six children and her father, James Barker, who was a Kentish Town tobacconist and an alcoholic. She cared for her invalid mother, Caroline Barker (née Williams), and siblings for seven years until her mother died. She was a devout Christian and taught Sunday School alongside her caring responsibilities.

== Career ==
After leaving school, Barker attended teacher training at Whitelands College in Chelsea in the 1890s. She became a schoolteacher who specialised in "troubled" children, teaching classes of up to sixty children from the deprived areas of London.

Barker became the Principal of the London County Council’s Women’s Institute correction facility in 1913, offering classes in skills such as dress-making and cookery and subjects such as art, literature and politics. She organised additional classes for female patients being treated at the London Lock Hospital for Venereal Disease.

After serving at the correction facility for two years, Barker resigned from her post after being recruited to join Britain's war effort during World War I. Her first role was as Commandant of the Women's Legion cooking section, where she organised the training of army cooks. She was then appointed Chief Welfare Superintendent of the Royal Arsenal, Woolwich, overseeing 30,000 women munitions workers. Her workers were surrounded by dangerous chemicals and TNT, but Barker organised canteens, first aid provision, recreational activities and rest rooms for the women. She was appointed CBE in 1917.

Following the war, Barker joined the Ministry of Labour's training department involved in retraining schemes for women. In 1923, she was appointed governor of the Borstal Institution for Girls at the Women's Prison, Aylesbury, which held 100 female offenders between the ages of sixteen and twenty-one. Under her administration, Barker made sweeping reforms that focused on education and rehabilitation. She worked as Governor until 1935.

In 1935, Barker became the first British female assistant prison commissioner. Barker became responsible for all women's prisons in England and Wales and worked to reform women's prisons throughout England, Wales and Scotland, based on her work at Aylesbury. She retired in 1943.

== Personal life ==
Barker was a lesbian. She met her partner, Florence Francis, whilst working as a Sunday school teacher. In 1914, after Barker's mother's death, Barker moved in with Francis and her family. The women lived together for 40 years, until Barker's death in 1955 at Kingsbridge, Devon.

== Damehood ==
Barker was named a Dame Commander of the Order of the British Empire (DBE) in 1944 for her "services in connection with the welfare of women and girls".
