= List of dams and reservoirs in the United Kingdom =

This is a list of dams and reservoirs in the United Kingdom.

== England ==
=== Buckinghamshire ===
- Foxcote Reservoir, north of Buckingham
- Weston Turville Reservoir, between Weston Turville and Wendover

=== Cambridgeshire ===
- Grafham Water

=== Cheshire ===
- Bollinhurst Reservoir
- Bosley Reservoir, Bosley
- Horse Coppice Reservoir
- Lamaload Reservoir, east of Macclesfield
- Lymm Dam, Lymm.
- Ridgegate Reservoir and Trentabank Reservoir, south-east of Macclesfield
- Sutton Reservoir, south of Macclesfield

=== Cornwall ===
- Argal and College Reservoirs, Falmouth
- Boscathnoe Reservoir, Penzance
- Bussow Reservoir, St Ives
- Cargenwen Reservoir
- Colliford Lake, Bodmin Moor
- Crowdy Reservoir, Bodmin Moor
- Drift Reservoir, Penzance
- Porth Reservoir, Newquay
- Siblyback Lake, Bodmin Moor
- Stithians Reservoir
- Upper Tamar Lake (Devon and Cornwall)

=== County Durham ===
- Balderhead Reservoir
- Blackton Reservoir
- Burnhope Reservoir
- Derwent Reservoir
- Grassholme Reservoir
- Hisehope Reservoir
- Hurworth Burn Reservoir
- Hury Reservoir
- Selset Reservoir
- Smiddy Shaw Reservoir
- Tunstall Reservoir
- Waskerley Reservoir

=== Cumbria ===
- Borrans Reservoir, north of Windermere (town)
- Castle Carrock Reservoir
- Chapelhouse Reservoir, south-east of Uldale
- Cow Green Reservoir east of Dufton Fell
- Dubbs Reservoir, north of Windermere (town)
- Ennerdale Water
- Fisher Tarn east of Kendal
- Harlock Reservoir, Pennington Reservoir, Poaka Beck Reservoir west of the town of Ulverston
- Haweswater Reservoir
- Hayeswater
- Kentmere Reservoir
- Killington Reservoir
- Meadley Reservoir, by Flat Fell, Ennerdale, Cumbria
- Simpson Ground Reservoir, east of Newby Bridge
- Thirlmere
- Wet Sleddale Reservoir

=== Derbyshire ===
- Butterley Reservoir
- Codnor Reservoir
- Carsington Water
- Combs Reservoir
- Errwood Reservoir
- Fernilee Reservoir
- Foremark Reservoir
- Hurst Reservoir
- Kinder Reservoir
- Linacre Reservoirs
  - Upper Reservoir
  - Middle Reservoir
  - Lower Reservoir
- Longdendale Chain of reservoirs
  - Arnfield Reservoir
  - Hollingworth Reservoir now drained and a nature reserve
  - Bottoms Reservoir
  - Valehouse Reservoir
  - Rhodeswood Reservoir
  - Torside Reservoir
  - Woodhead Reservoir
- Loscoe Dam
- Mossy Lea Reservoir
- Ogston Reservoir
- Staunton Harold Reservoir
- Swineshaw Reservoir (Derbyshire)
- Toddbrook Reservoir
- Upper Derwent Valley
  - Ladybower Reservoir
  - Derwent Reservoir with Birchinlee
  - Howden Reservoir Eastern half is in Sheffield (South Yorkshire)
- Upper Swineshaw Reservoir (Derbyshire)

=== Devon ===
- Avon Dam Reservoir
- Burrator Reservoir
- Challacombe/Bray Reservoir
- Butter Brook Reservoir
- Darracott Reservoir
- Fernworthy Reservoir
- Gammaton Reservoirs
- Holywell Reservoir
- Jennetts Reservoir
- Kennick Reservoir
- Lower Tamar Lake
- Melbury Reservoir
- Meldon Reservoir
- River Tavy Reservoir
- Roadford Lake
- Slade Reservoir
- Squabmoor reservoir
- Tottiford Reservoir
- Trenchford Reservoir
- Upper Tamar Lake (Devon and Cornwall)
- Venford Reservoir
- Wheal Jewell Reservoir
- Wistlandpound Reservoir

=== East Sussex ===
- Arlington Reservoir
- Darwell Reservoir
- Powdermill Reservoir

=== Essex ===
- Abberton Reservoir
- Ardleigh Reservoir
- Hanningfield Reservoir

=== Gloucestershire ===
- Dowdeswell Reservoir
- Witcombe Reservoir

=== Greater Manchester ===
- Bolton:
  - Belmont Reservoir
  - Bryan Hey Reservoir
  - Dean Mills Reservoir
  - High Rid Reservoir
  - Lower Rivington Reservoir
  - Rumworth Lodge Reservoir
  - Upper Rivington Reservoir
- Bury
  - Lowercroft Reservoir
  - Manchester, Bolton and Bury Reservoir (Elton Reservoir)
- Manchester:
  - Gorton Reservoirs
  - Heaton Park Reservoir
- Oldham:
  - Ashworth Moor Reservoir
  - Besom Hill Reservoir
  - Black Moss Reservoir (Greater Manchester)
  - Brownhouse Wham Reservoir
  - Brushes Clough Reservoir
  - Castleshaw Reservoir
  - Chew_Reservoir
  - Crook Gate Reservoir
  - Diggle Reservoir
  - Dovestones Reservoir
  - Dowry Reservoir
  - Greenfield Reservoir
  - Hamer Pasture Reservoir
  - New Years Bridge Reservoir
  - Readycon Dean Reservoir
  - Strinesdale Reservoir
  - Yeoman Hey Reservoir
- Rochdale:
  - Ashworth Moor Reservoir
  - Blackstone Edge Reservoir
  - Chelburn Reservoir
  - Greenbooth Reservoir
  - Hanging Lees Reservoir
  - Hollingworth Lake
  - Kitcliffe Reservoir
  - Light Hazzles Reservoir
  - Lower Chelburn Reservoir
  - Naden Reservoirs (Higher, Middle and Lower)
  - Norman Hill Reservoir
  - Ogden Reservoir
  - Piethorne Reservoir
  - Rooden Reservoir
  - Watergrove Reservoir
- Tameside:
  - Audenshaw Reservoirs
  - Brushes Reservoir
  - Denton Reservoirs
  - Godley Reservoir
  - Higher Swineshaw Reservoir
  - Lower Swineshaw Reservoir
  - Swineshaw Reservoirs
  - Walkerwood Reservoir
- Wigan:
  - Worthington Lakes

=== Hampshire ===
- Havant Thicket Reservoir - under construction, scheduled to open 2029.

=== Hertfordshire ===
- Tring Reservoirs

=== Kent ===
- Bough Beech
- Bewl Water

=== Lancashire ===
- Anglezarke Reservoir
- Belmont Reservoir
- Black Moss Reservoirs
- Calf Hey Reservoir
- Cowm Reservoir
- Delph Reservoir
- Dingle Reservoir
- Foulridge Reservoir
- High Bullough Reservoir
- Holden Wood Reservoir
- Jumbles Reservoir
- Lower Rivington Reservoir
- Lower Roddlesworth Reservoir
- Lower Ogden Reservoir
- Rake Brook Reservoir
- Spring Mill Reservoir
- Springs Reservoir
- Stocks Reservoir
- Turton and Entwistle Reservoir
- Upper Ogden Reservoir
- Upper Rivington Reservoir
- Upper Roddlesworth Reservoir
- Walves Reservoir
- Ward's Reservoir (Blue Lagoon)
- Watersheddles Reservoir (owned by Yorkshire Water)
- Wayoh Reservoir
- Yarrow Reservoir

=== Leicestershire ===
- Blackbrook Reservoir
- Eyebrook Reservoir (Corby)
- Cropston Reservoir
- Knipton Reservoir
- Nanpantan Reservoir
- Saddington Reservoir
- Staunton Harold Reservoir
- Swithland Reservoir
- Thornton Reservoir

=== Lincolnshire ===
- Covenham Reservoir
- Denton Reservoir
- Knipton Reservoir

=== London ===
- Brent Reservoir (also known as the Welsh Harp)
- Grand Junction Reservoir
- Stain Hill Reservoirs
- Stoke Newington West Reservoir
- Woodberry Wetlands (Originally the Woodberry Down/Stoke Newington East Reservoir)
- Sunnyside Reservoir

The following reservoirs form the Lee Valley Reservoir Chain.

- King George's Reservoir, London Borough of Enfield (also known as King George V Reservoir)
- William Girling Reservoir, London Borough of Enfield
- Banbury Reservoir, London Borough of Waltham Forest
- Lockwood Reservoir, London Borough of Waltham Forest
- High Maynard Reservoir, London Borough of Waltham Forest
- Low Maynard Reservoir, London Borough of Waltham Forest
- Walthamstow Reservoirs, London Borough of Waltham Forest, five linked numbered reservoirs
- East Warwick Reservoir, London Borough of Waltham Forest
- West Warwick Reservoir, London Borough of Waltham Forest

=== Northamptonshire ===
- Barby Storage Reservoir
- Boddington Reservoir, Oxford canal supply reservoir, Upper Boddington
- Cransley Reservoir (Kettering)
- Daventry Reservoir in Daventry Country Park
- Drayton Reservoir (Daventry)
- Hollowell reservoir Hollowell
- Naseby Reservoir, Grand Union Canal supply, Naseby
- Pitsford Water
- Ravensthorpe Reservoir
- Stanford Reservoir, between Stanford-on-Avon and South Kilworth
- Sulby Reservoir
- Sywell Reservoir
- Thorpe Malsor Reservoir (Kettering)
- Welford Reservoir

=== Northumberland ===
- Bakethin Reservoir
- Catcleugh Reservoir
- Colt Crag Reservoir
- Fontburn
- Hallington Reservoirs
- Little Swinburne Reservoir
- Kielder Water
- Whittle Dene

=== North Yorkshire ===
- Angram Reservoir
- Beaver Dyke Reservoirs
- Chelker Reservoir
- Cod Beck Reservoir
- Elslack Reservoir
- Embsay Reservoir
- Fewston Reservoir
- Gouthwaite Reservoir
- Grimwith Reservoir
- Laneshaw Reservoir
- Leighton Reservoir
- Lindley Wood Reservoir
- Lockwood Beck Reservoir
- Lower Barden Reservoir
- Lumley Moor Reservoir
- March Ghyll Reservoir
- Mossy Moor Reservoir
- Oulston Reservoir
- Roundhill Reservoir
- Scaling Dam Reservoir
- Scar House Reservoir
- Scargill Reservoir
- Swinsty Reservoir
- Ten Acre Reservoir
- Thornton Steward Reservoir
- Thruscross Reservoir
- Upper Barden Reservoir
- Winterburn Reservoir

=== Oxfordshire ===
- Clattercote Reservoir (Banbury)
- Farmoor Reservoir (Oxford)
- Grimsbury Reservoir,(Banbury)

=== Rutland ===
- Rutland Water

=== Shropshire ===
- Chelmarsh Reservoir
- Knighton Reservoir

=== Somerset ===
- Ashford Reservoir
- Barrow Gurney Tanks
- Blagdon Lake
- Chard Reservoir
- Cheddar Reservoir
- Chew Valley Lake
- Clatworthy Reservoir
- Durleigh reservoir
- Hawkridge Reservoir
- Leigh Reservoir
- Litton Reservoirs
- Luxhay Reservoir
- Nutscale Reservoir
- Otterhead Lakes
- Sutton Bingham Reservoir
- Wimbleball Lake

=== South Yorkshire ===
- Agden Reservoir
- Broadstone Reservoir
- Broomhead Reservoir
- Dale Dyke Reservoir
- Damflask Reservoir
- Elsecar Reservoir
- Harthill Reservoir, feeder for the Chesterfield canal
- Howden Reservoir Western half is in Derbyshire
- Ingbirchworth Reservoir
- Langsett Reservoir
- Midhope Reservoir
- More Hall Reservoir
- Pebley Reservoir (Sheffield)
- Redmires Reservoirs
- Rivelin Dams
- Royd Moor Reservoir
- Scout Dyke Reservoir
- Snailsden Reservoir
- Strines Reservoir
- Ulley Reservoir
- Underbank Reservoir
- Weecher Reservoir
- Wharncliffe Reservoir
- Windleden Reservoirs
- Winscar Reservoir
- Worsbrough Reservoir

=== Staffordshire ===
- Bathpool Park Lake
- Belvide Reservoir
- Betley Hall Reservoir
- Blithfield Reservoir
- Bromley Mill Pool
- Brookleys Lake
- Canwell Estate Reservoir
- Chasewater
- Gailey Reservoir
- Gap Pool
- Hales Hall Pool
- Hatherton Reservoir
- Hanch Reservoir
- Holly Bush Lake
- Knypersley Reservoir
- Minster Pool
- Rudyard Lake
- Stowe Pool
- Swinfen Lake
- Tixall Park Pool
- Trentham Gardens Lake
- Tittesworth Reservoir

=== Surrey ===
- Bessborough Reservoir
- Island Barn Reservoir
- King George VI Reservoir
- Knight Reservoir
- Molesey Reservoirs
- Queen Elizabeth II Reservoir
- Queen Mary Reservoir
- Queen Mother Reservoir
- Staines Reservoirs
- Wraysbury Reservoir

=== Suffolk ===
- Alton Water

=== Warwickshire ===
- Draycote Water
- Napton Reservoir, Grand Union Canal
- Oldbury Reservoir
- Packington Lakes, Grand Union Canal
- Shustoke Reservoirs
- Stockton Reservoir, Grand Union Canal
- Wormleighton Reservoir

=== West Midlands ===
- Bartley Reservoir (Birmingham)
- Brookvale Park Lake (Birmingham)
- Edgbaston Reservoir (Birmingham)
- Frankley Reservoir (Birmingham)
- Lifford Reservoir (Birmingham)
- Netherton Reservoir, Dudley
- Olton Reservoir, Solihull
- Perry Barr Reservoir (covered) (Birmingham)
- Witton Lakes (Birmingham)
- see also Elan Valley Reservoirs (Wales) which were built by, and supply, Birmingham

=== West Sussex ===
- Ardingly Reservoir
- Weir Wood Reservoir

=== West Yorkshire ===
- Ardsley Reservoir
- Baitings Reservoir
- Bilberry Reservoir
- Blackmoorfoot Reservoir
- Black Moss Reservoir
- Blakeley Reservoir
- Booth Dean Upper Reservoir
- Booth Dean Lower Reservoir
- Booth Wood Reservoir
- Boshaw Whams Reservoir
- Brownhill Reservoir
- Butterley Reservoir
- Chelker Reservoir
- (Upper and Lower) Chellow Dene Reservoirs
- Cupwith Reservoir
- Dean Head Upper Reservoir
- Dean Head Lower Reservoir
- Dean Head Reservoir
- Deer Hill Reservoir
- Digley Reservoir
- Doe Park Reservoir
- Eccup Reservoir
- Eldwick Reservoir
- Elslack Reservoir
- Gorple Lower Reservoir
- Gorple Upper Reservoir
- Graincliffe Reservoir
- Green Withens Reservoir
- Hewenden Reservoir
- Holme Styes Reservoir
- Keighley Moor Reservoir
- Leeming Reservoir
- Leeshaw Reservoir
- Lower Laithe Reservoir
- March Ghyll Reservoir
- March Hey Reservoir
- Mixenden Reservoir
- Ogden Reservoir
- Panorama Reservoir
- Ponden Reservoir
- Ramsden Reservoir
- Redbrook Reservoir
- Reva Reservoir
- Riding Wood Reservoir
- Ringstone Edge Reservoir
- Ryburn Reservoir
- Scammonden Reservoir
- Silsden Reservoir
- Stubden Reservoir
- Sunnydale Reservoir
- Swellands Reservoir
- Thornton Moor Reservoir
- Walshaw Dean Reservoirs
- Warland Reservoir (Mostly in West Yorkshire, partly in Greater Manchester)
- Warley Moor Reservoir
- Weecher Reservoir
- Wessenden Reservoir
- Wessenden Head Reservoir
- Widdop Reservoir
- Yateholme Reservoir

=== Wiltshire ===
- Wilton Water header reservoir for the Kennet and Avon Canal

=== Worcestershire ===
- Bittell Reservoirs (Upper and Lower)
- Tardebigge Reservoir

== Northern Ireland ==
=== County Down ===
- Silent Valley Reservoir
- Spelga Reservoir

== Scotland ==
=== City of Aberdeen ===
- Braeside Reservoir
- Cattofield Reservoir
- Mannofield Reservoir
- Slopefield Reservoir
- Smithfield Reservoir

=== Aberdeenshire ===
- Bluehills Reservoir
- Clochandighter Reservoir
- Garlogie Dam
- Inchgarth Reservoir - Cults
- Loch of Aboyne
- Loch Saugh
- Silver Dam aka Culter Compensation Dam

=== Angus ===
- Backwater Reservoir
- Brewlands Reservoir
- Crombie Reservoir
- Den of Ogil
- Glenogil
- Kinnaird Lake
- Ledcrieff Loch
- Linrathen
- Linrathen Clear Water Storage
- Loch Auchintaple or Auchintaple Loch
- Loch Lee
- Loch Shandra
- Long Loch
- Monikie Clear Water Basin
- Monikie North Pond
- Monikie South (Island) Pond
- Piperdam Loch

=== Argyll and Bute ===
- Allt na Lairige - Glen Fyne
- Ardlussa Fishing Loch - Isle of Jura
- Asgog Loch - Tighnabruaich
- Aucha Lochy - Campbeltown
- Auchengaich Reservoir - Glen Fruin
- Beochlich - 9 km NW of Inveraray
- Bishop's Glen Reservoir (also known as Dunoon Reservoir) - Dunoon
- Blackmill Loch - Minard
- Cam Loch - North Knapdale
- Craignafeich Reservoirs - Tighnabruaich
- Crarae Reservoir - Minard
- Crosshill Loch - Campbeltown
- Cruachan Reservoir - Loch Awe
- Daill Loch - North Knapdale
- Dhu Loch - Bute
- Feorlin - Minard
- Gleann Dubh - Barcaldine
- Gleann Loch - North Knapdale
- Helensburgh No. 1 Reservoir - Helensburgh
- Helensburgh No. 2 Reservoir - Helensburgh
- Kilduskland Reservoir - Ardrishaig
- Kirk Dam - Bute
- Knockruan Loch - Campbeltown
- Leorin Loch - Port Ellen, Islay
- Lindowan Reservoir - Kilcreggan
- Loch A' Bharain - North Knapdale
- Loch A' Chaorainn - South Knapdale
- Loch Allan - Port Askaig, Islay
- Loch a'Mhuillin - North Knapdale
- Loch an Add - North Knapdale
- Loch an Droighinn - Kilchrenan
- Loch an Sgoltaire - Isle of Colonsay
- Loch an Torr - Dervaig, Isle of Mull
- Loch Ascog - Isle of Bute
- Loch Assapol - Bunessan, Isle of Mull
- Loch Awe - part of the Awe hydroelectric scheme
- Loch Ba - Gruline, Isle of Mull
- Loch Bearnoch - Lochdon, Isle of Mull
- Loch Beinn Uraraidh - Port Ellen, Islay
- Loch Cam - Bridgend, Isle of Islay
- Loch Chaorunn - South Knapdale
- Loch Ciaran - Clachan, North Kintyre
- Loch Clachaig - North Knapdale
- Loch Eck - Cowal
- Loch Fad - Bute
- Loch Finlas - 4 km SW Luss
- Loch Gearach - Port Charlotte, Islay
- Loch Glashan - Lochgair, Mid-Argyll
- Loch Gleann - Oban
- Loch Iarnan - Port Ellen, Islay
- Loch Leacann - Furnace
- Loch Lebdgei (Dubh Loch) - North Knapdale
- Loch Lebgei - North Knapdale
- Loch Na Bric - North Knapdale
- Loch na Creige Crainde - North Knapdale
- Loch Na Faoilinn - North Knapdale
- Loch Na Sreinge - 9 km NE of Kilmelford
- Loch Nam Ban - Port Askaig, Islay
- Loch Nam Breac Buidhe - North Knapdale
- Loch Nan Torran - South Knapdale
- Loch Righeachan - Inveraray
- Loch Skerrols - Bridgend, Isle of Islay
- Loch Sloy (reservoir) (Loch Sloy Hydro-Electric Scheme) - 6 km N of Arrochar
- Loch Tarsan - Glen Lean, Cowal
- Loch Tralaig - Kilmelford
- Loch Turamin (New Loch) - Isle of Colonsay
- Loch Uigeadail - Port Ellen, Islay
- Lochan A' Ghurrabain - Tobermory, Isle of Mull
- Lochan Duin - North Knapdale
- Lochan Ghlas - Garelochhead
- Lochan Gleann Astaile - Isle of Jura
- Lochan Lasgainn Mor - Kilmelford
- Lower Glen Shira - 12 km NE of Inveraray
- Luachrach Loch - Oban
- Main Glen Shira - 13 km NE of Inveraray
- Mishnish Lochs - Tobermory, Isle of Mull
- Nant Reservoir - Kilchrenan
- Oude Reservoir - Kilmelford
- Powder Mill Dam - Tighnabruaich
- Sholum Lochs - Port Ellen, Islay
- Still Loch - Ardrishaig
- Strathduie Water (Lussa Hydro-Electric Scheme) - Campbeltown

=== Clackmannanshire ===
- Gartmorn Dam

=== Dumfries and Galloway ===
- Carsfad Loch
- Clatteringshaws Loch
- Glenkiln Reservoir
- Kettleton Reservoir
- Black Esk Dam
- Winterhope Reservoir

=== City of Dundee ===
- Clatto Reservoir

=== East Ayrshire ===
- Afton Reservoir
- Corsehouse Reservoir
- Craigendunton Reservoir
- Glenbuck Loch
- Loch Finlas

=== East Dunbartonshire ===
- Bankell Reservoir - supplies Milngavie water treatment works
- Craigmaddie Reservoir - supplies Milngavie water treatment works
- Mugdock Reservoir - supplies Milngavie water treatment works

=== East Lothian ===
- Hopes Reservoir
- Lammerloch
- Stobshiel Reservoir
- Whiteadder Reservoir

=== East Renfrewshire ===
- Balgray Reservoir
- Littleton Reservoir
- Ryat Linn Reservoir
- Waulkmill Glen Reservoir
- Walton Dam
- Glanderston Dam
- Snypes Dam
- Kirkton Dam
- Harelaw Reservoir, Fereneze Golf Course
- Harelaw Reservoir, Eaglesham Moor
- Rouken Glen Pond
- Craighall Reservoir
- Commore Dam
- White Loch
- Black Loch
- Brother Loch
- Little Loch
- Pilmuir Reservoir
- Loch Craig
- Bennan Loch
- Corsehouse Reservoir (on the border with East Ayrshire)
- Long Loch
- Loch Goin
- Dunwan Loch
- High Dam
- Picketlaw Reservoir
- Caplaw Dam (on the border with Renfrewshire)
- Netherplace Reservoir (at the dye works)
- Glenburn Reservoir

=== City of Edinburgh ===
- Clubbiedean Reservoir
- Harlaw Reservoir
- Threipmuir Reservoir
- Torduff Reservoir
- Bonaly Reservoir

=== Falkirk ===
- Faughlin Reservoir
- Millhall Reservoir

=== Fife ===
- Ballo Reservoir
- Clatto Reservoir
- Cameron Reservoir
- Castlehill Reservoir
- Drumain Reservoir
- Holl Reservoir
- Harperleas Reservoir
- Stenhouse Loch
- Carriston Reservoir
- Donald Rose Reservoir
- Carlhurlie Reservoir

=== City of Glasgow ===
- Hogganfield Loch

=== Highland ===
- Blackwater Reservoir, near Kinlochleven
- Clunas Reservoir
- Loch Benevean
- Loch Laggan and Loch Treig - both part of the Lochaber hydroelectric scheme
- Loch Monar - part of the Strathfarrar hydroelectric scheme
- Loch Quoich and Loch Garry - both part of the Glen Garry hydroelectric scheme
- Loch Loyne and Loch Cluanie - both part of the Glen Moriston hydroelectric scheme
- Loch Mullardoch - part of the Glen Affric hydroelectric scheme
- Loch Glascarnoch

=== Inverclyde ===
- Loch Thom
- Gryffe Reservoir
- Harelaw Reservoir
- Knocknair’shill Reservoir
- Dougliehill Reservoir

=== Midlothian ===
- Edgelaw Reservoir
- Gladhouse Reservoir
- Glencorse Reservoir
- North Esk Reservoir
- Rosebery Reservoir
- Loganlea Reservoir

=== Moray ===
- Glenlatterach Reservoir

=== North Ayrshire ===
- Auldmuir Reservoir
- Barcraigs Reservoir
- Busbie Muir Reservoir
- Caaf Reservoir
- Camphill Reservoir
- Cuffhill Reservoir
- Glenburn Reservoir
- Kelly Reservoir
- Knockendon Reservoir
- Kirkleegreen Reservoir
- Mill Glen Reservoir
- Muirhead Reservoir
- Munnoch Reservoir
- Outerwards Reservoir
- Skelmorlie Lower Reservoir
- Skelmorlie Upper Reservoir

=== North Lanarkshire ===
- Birkenburn
- Broadwood Loch
- Daer
- Dalmacoulter
- Forrestburn
- Glenhove No. 1
- Glenhove No. 2
- Hillend Loch
- Lilly Loch
- Roughrigg
- Strathclyde Park
- Townhead Reservoir
- West Corrie

=== Orkney ===
- Wideford Hill Reservoir (drained)
- Stromness Waterworks

=== Perth and Kinross ===
- Dunalastair Water
- Loch Tummel - part of the Tummel Valley hydroelectric scheme
- Loch Turret Reservoir and Glenturret Dam. Near Crieff
- Lower Glendevon Reservoir
- Upper Glendevon Reservoir

=== Renfrewshire ===
- Houstonhead Dam
- Kaim Dam
- Rowbank Reservoir
- Stanely Reservoir

=== Scottish Borders ===
- Acreknowe Reservoir
- Alemoor Loch
- Baddinsgill Reservoir
- Fruid Reservoir
- Megget Reservoir
- Talla Reservoir
- Watch Fly Reservoir
- Westwater Reservoir
- Williestruther Loch

=== Shetland ===
- Sandy Loch Reservoir

=== South Ayrshire ===
- Bradan Service Reservoir
- Collenan
- Glendrissaigh
- Loch Bradan
- Loch Riecawr
- Loch Spallander
- Loch Spouts
- Penwhapple
- Raith

=== South Lanarkshire ===
- Camps Reservoir
- Culter Waterhead Reservoir

=== Stirling ===
- Cocksburn Reservoir
- Earlsburn Reservoir
- North Third Reservoir

=== West Dunbartonshire ===
- Cochno Loch
- Jaw Reservoir
- Greenside Reservoir
- Carman Reservoir
- Kilmannan Reservoir (on the border with Stirling)
- Burncrooks Reservoir (on the border with Stirling)

=== West Lothian ===
- Cobbinshaw Reservoir
- Eliburn Reservoir
- Harperrig Reservoir
- Lochcote Reservoir

=== Western Isles ===
- Loch Mor an Stairr - Isle of Lewis
- Roghadal Reservoir - Isle of Harris
- Loch Chliostair - Isle of Harris

== Wales ==
=== Anglesey ===
- Llyn Alaw - water supply to much of north Anglesey
- Llyn Cefni - water supply to central Anglesey

=== Bridgend ===
- Kenfig Pool - Natural Lake

=== Cardiff ===
- Llanishen Reservoir - water supply to Cardiff
- Lisvane Reservoir - water Supply to Cardiff

=== Carmarthenshire ===
- Upper and Lower Cwm Lliedi reservoirs also known as Swiss Valley reservoirs
- Llyn Brianne
- Llyn y Fan Fach
- Usk Reservoir

=== Ceredigion ===
- Dinas Reservoir
- Teifi Pools
- Llyn Teifi
- Nant-y-moch Reservoir

=== Conwy ===
- Llyn Bodgynydd - supply for the Pandora lead mine (disused)
- Llyn Brenig - part of Dee Regulation system - also in Denbighshire
- Llyn Coedty - water supply for Dolgarrog hydroelectric station
- Llyn Conwy - water supply for Llanrwst and Betws-y-Coed
- Llyn Cowlyd - water supply for Conwy and Colwyn Bay and for Dolgarrog hydroelectric station
- Llyn Crafnant - water supply for Llanrwst
- Llyn Dulyn - water supply for Llandudno
- Llyn Melynllyn - water supply for Llandudno
- Llyn Parc - supply for the Aberllyn mine (disused)
- Llyn Elsi - water supply for Betws-y-Coed (disused)

=== Denbighshire ===
- Aled Isaf Reservoir
- Alwen Reservoir
- Llyn Aled
- Llyn Alwen
- Llyn Brenig - part of the River Dee regulation system
- Llyn Celyn - part of the River Dee regulation system.
- Pendinas Reservoir
- Bala Lake (Llyn Tegid)
- Nant-y-Ffrith Reservoir

=== Gwynedd ===
- Llyn Anafon - water supply for Llanfairfechan, Dwygyfylchi and Penmaenmawr
- Llyn Arenig Fach
- Llyn Arenig Fawr - water supply for Bala town
- Llynnau Barlwyd - supply to Llechwedd slate quarry
- Llyn Bodlyn - water supply to Barmouth.
- Llyn Bowydd - supply to the Blaenau Ffestiniog slate quarries
- Llyn Cwm Corsiog - supply for Rhosydd slate quarry (disused)
- Llyn Cwellyn - water supply to Bangor and parts of south Anglesey
- Marchlyn Mawr - header reservoir for the Dinorwig power station hydroelectric system.
- Llyn Peris
- Llyn Padarn - part of the Dinorwig hydroelectric system
- Llyn Stwlan - built for the hydroelectric Ffestiniog Power Station
- Llyn Trawsfynydd - built for the Maentwrog hydroelectric Power Station

=== Merthyr Tydfil ===
- Llwyn-on Reservoir
- Pontsticill Reservoir, including Pentwyn Reservoir

=== Neath Port Talbot ===
- Eglwys Nunydd - water supply to Tata Steel Europe steel-works at Port Talbot

=== Pembrokeshire ===
- Bosherston Lakes - artificial amenity lakes
- Llys-y-Frân Reservoir
- Rosebush Reservoir

=== Powys ===
- Taff Fawr reservoirs- a chain of three reservoirs supplying the Rhondda and Taff valley and Cardiff with water
  - Beacons Reservoir
  - Cantref Reservoir
  - also see Llwyn-on Reservoir in Merthyr Tydfil
- Taff Fechan reservoirs - a chain of four reservoirs also supplying the Taff valley and Cardiff with water
  - Upper Neuadd Reservoir
  - Lower Neuadd Reservoir
  - Doly y gaer Reservoir
  - Pontsticill Reservoir
- Elan Valley Reservoirs - a group of reservoirs supplying Birmingham and parts of the West Midlands conurbation with drinking water
  - Claerwen Reservoir
  - Craig-goch Reservoir
  - Penygarreg Reservoir
  - Garreg-ddu Reservoir
  - Caban-coch Reservoir
- Lake Vyrnwy (Llyn Efyrnwy) - supplies water to the Liverpool area
- Talybont Reservoir
- Ystradfellte Reservoir
- Clywedog Reservoir (Llyn Clywedog)

=== Rhondda Cynon Taf ===
- Lluest-wen Reservoir

=== Swansea ===
- Cray Reservoir
- Swansea Barrage
- Upper and Lower Lliw Reservoirs

=== Torfaen ===
- Llandegfedd Reservoir

=== Wrexham ===
- Cae Llwyd Reservoir
- Penycae Top Reservoir
- Ty Mawr Reservoir

== See also ==
- Ofwat
- List of dams and reservoirs
- List of reservoirs in the United Kingdom by volume
  - Geography of the United Kingdom
  - List of lakes in England
  - List of loughs in Ireland
  - List of lochs in Scotland
  - List of lakes in Wales
  - List of rivers of the United Kingdom
  - Waterways in the United Kingdom
