= Helensburgh No. 1 Reservoir =

Helensburgh, No 1 Reservoir
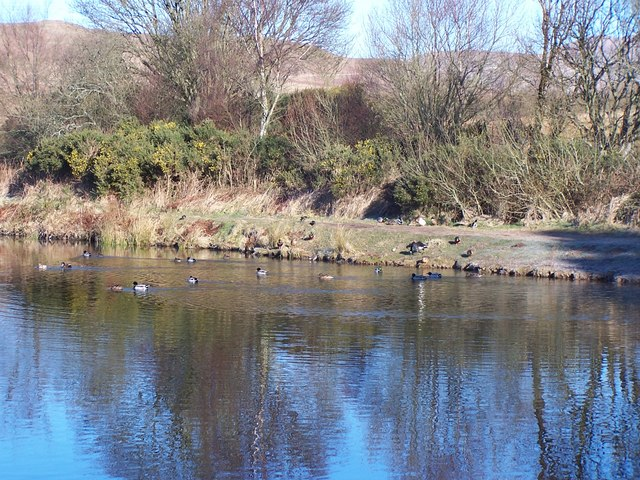

- Location within Argyll and Bute
- Location: Helensburgh, Scotland
- Coordinates: 56.0186°N 4.7188°W grid reference NS30468387
- Type: Reservoir
- Basin countries: Scotland, United Kingdom
- Surface area: 39,500 m^{2} (425,000 sq ft)
- Water volume: 117,000 m^{3} (95 acre⋅ft)
- Surface elevation: 107 m (351 ft)

The Helensburgh No. 1 reservoir is of the non-impounding variety. It is no longer part of the local water supply system and is used by Helensburgh Angling Club. The earthen dam is 6 metres high and records show it was constructed before 1868.

== See also ==
- List of reservoirs and dams in the United Kingdom

== Sources ==
- "Argyll and Bute Council Reservoirs Act 1975 Public Register"
