= Foulridge Reservoirs =

Reservoirs in Lancashire, England

Coordinates: 53.873°N 2.177°W

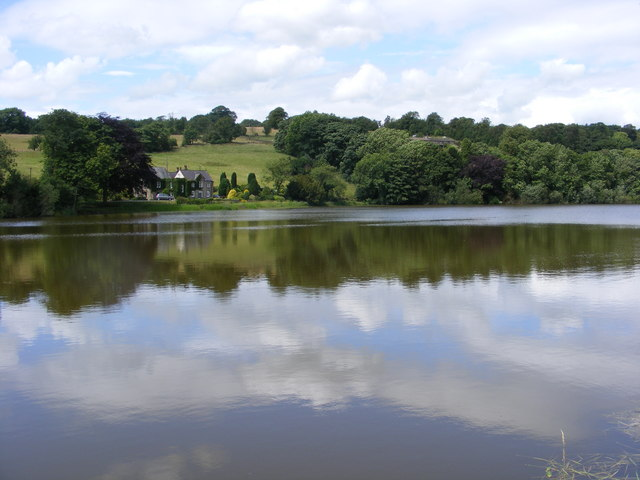
Slipper Hill Reservoir, near Foulridge

The Foulridge Reservoirs are a set of artificial open reservoirs constructed to provide water to the Leeds & Liverpool Canal. The reservoirs include:

- Foulridge Reservoir (or Foulridge Upper Reservoir)
- Lake Burwain (or Foulridge Lower Reservoir)
- Slipper Hill Reservoir (also known as ‘Old Ebbies’)
- Whitemoor Reservoir (previously known as White Moor Reservoir)

The four reservoirs are all near Foulridge village, north of Colne in Lancashire, England. They provide summit water to the canal, feeding the highest point of the canal as it crosses the Pennines.

The catchments of the reservoirs are the upper reaches of Pendle Water around Wanlass Beck. Specifically, Moss Houses Beck feeds Foulridge Reservoir which in turn feeds Lake Burwain and Slipper Hill Reservoirs and Whitemoor Reservoir which is fed primarily from Whinberry Clough.

Other adjacent reservoirs in the Leeds & Liverpool Canal water supply system are Winterburn to the east and Barrowford to the west.

The reservoirs are owned and managed by the Canal & River Trust, previously British Waterways.

== History ==
The construction of the reservoirs was enabled through the Leeds and Liverpool Canal Act of 1790. Construction of the reservoirs coincided with the building of this section of the canal, during the 1790’s. Lake Burwain was deepened in the 1830’s.
