= Craignafeich Reservoirs =

Dam on Craignafeoch Burn
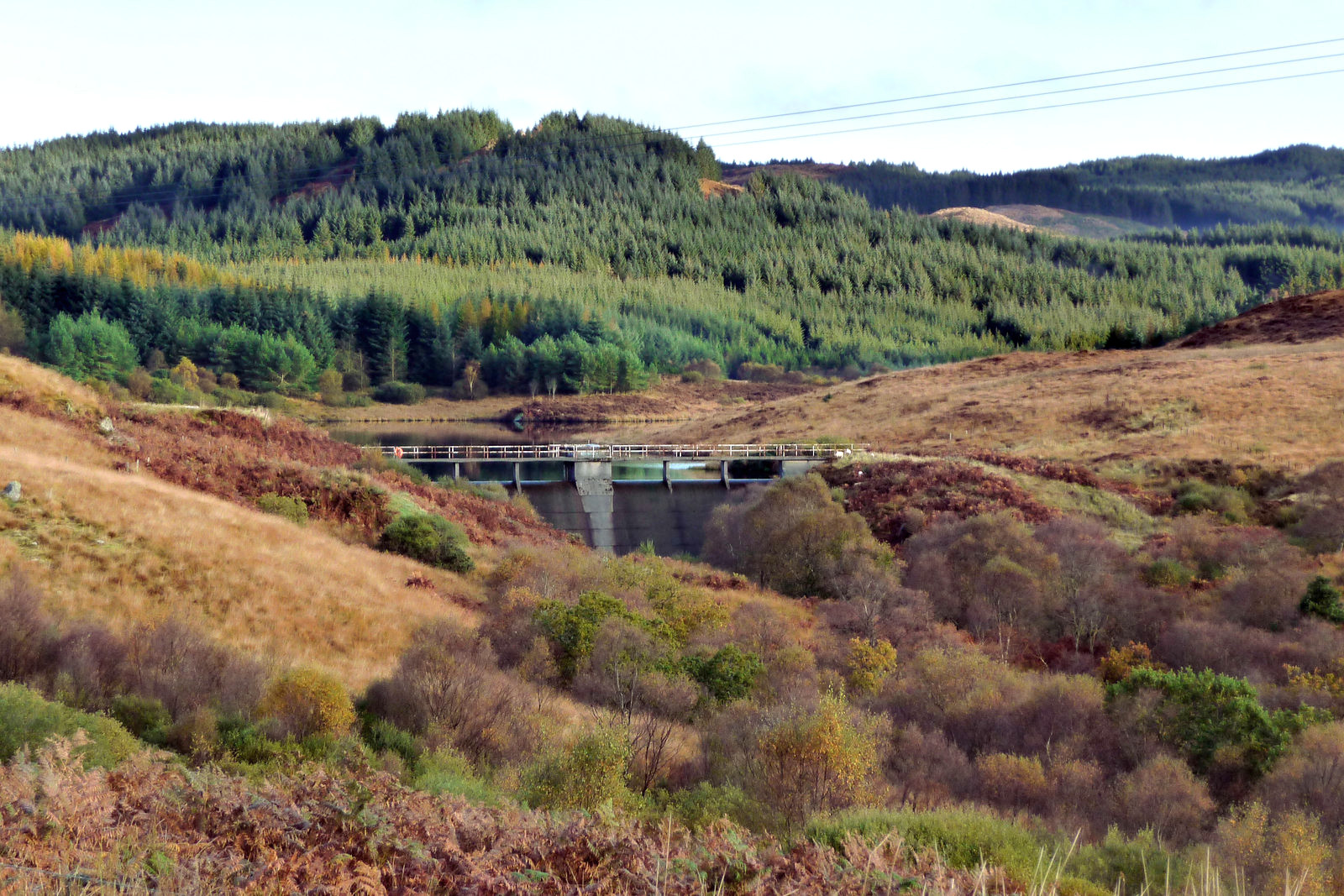

- Location within Scotland
- Location: Tighnabruaich, Scotland
- Coordinates: 55.9150°N 5.2813°W grid reference NR94877357
- Type: Reservoir
- Primary inflows: Craignafeoch Burn
- Primary outflows: Craignafeoch Burn
- Basin countries: Scotland, United Kingdom
- Surface area: 61,450 m^{2} (661,400 sq ft)
- Water volume: 250,000 m^{3} (200 acre⋅ft)

The Craignafeich Reservoirs (also “Craignafeoch”) are a pair of lochs in Archarossan Forest, 3 kilometres west of Tighnabruaich. The main concrete dam is 15.8 metres high, and was completed in 1972.

== See also ==
- List of reservoirs and dams in the United Kingdom

== Sources ==
- "Argyll and Bute Council Reservoirs Act 1975 Public Register"
