= Leigh Reservoir =

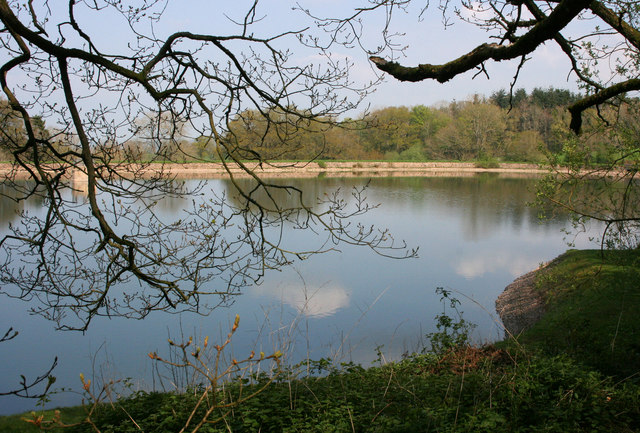
- The reservoir in April 2009

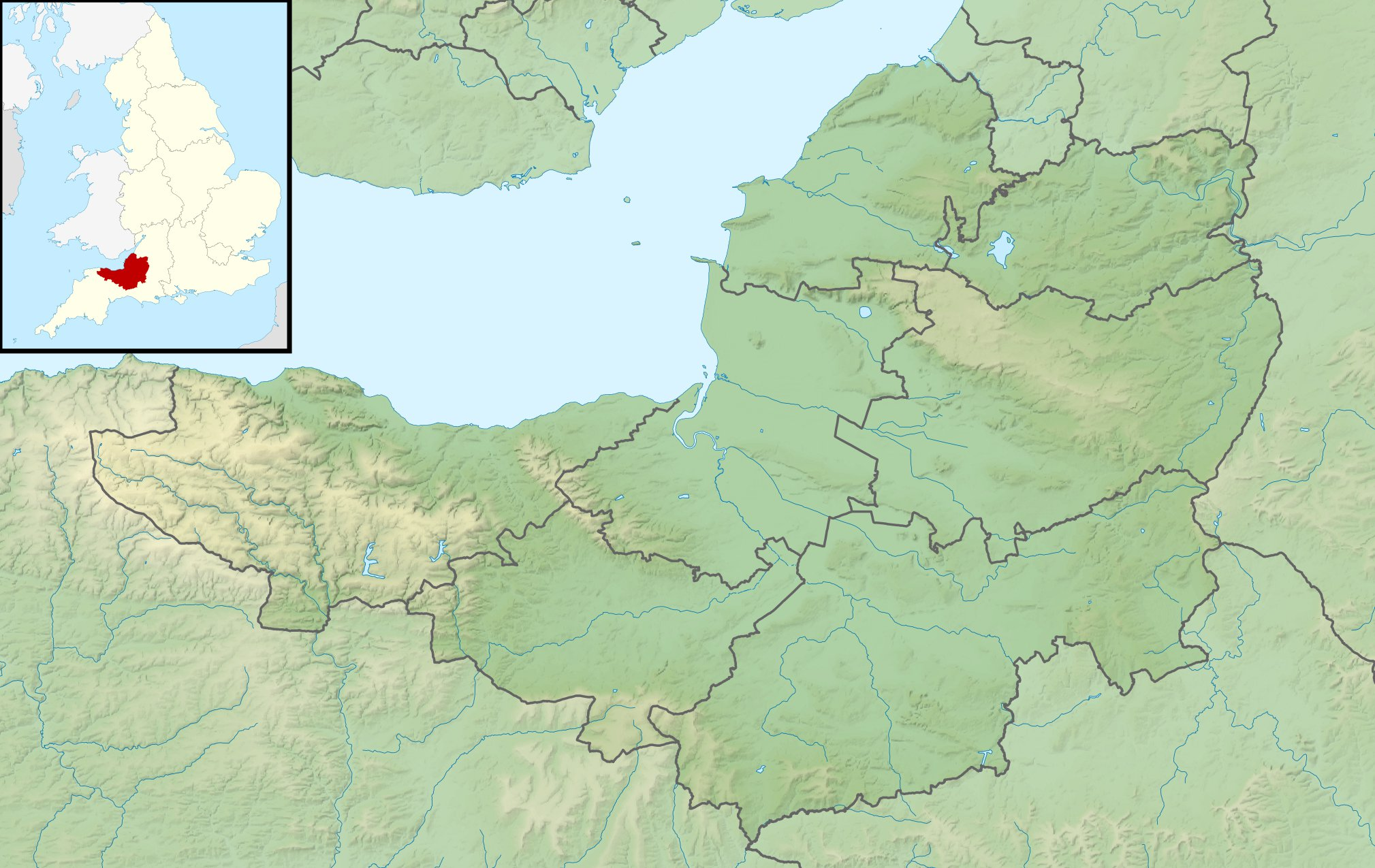
- Location in Somerset
- Country: England
- Location: Pitminster, Somerset
- Coordinates: 50.952712°N 3.144439°W
- Status: Full
- Opening date: 1893
- Operator: Wessex Water

Reservoir
- Catchment area: 20.5 hectares (51 acres)
- Surface area: 2.128 hectares (5.26 acres)
- Normal elevation: 160 metres (520 ft)

Leigh Reservoir, or Leigh Hill Reservoir, is a small reservoir in Somerset, England. It was built in 1893 to supply water to the town of Taunton, Somerset, which lies to the north. Water quality is good.

== Location ==
Leigh Reservoir is an artificial lake in the parish of Pitminster, Somerset, 15.1 kilometres (9.4 mi) from the sea. It is to the west of Luxhay Reservoir and south of the village of Lowton, near to Angersleigh. It is 160 metres (520 ft) above sea level. The reservoir is near the southern boundary of the River Tone catchment basin. In 1912 the reservoir had an 8 inches (200 mm) rain gauge 1.5 feet (0.46 m) above ground that recorded rainfall on 180 days of 43.34 inches (1,101 mm) in total.

== Description ==
A plaque on the reservoir is dated 1893, and gives the surface area of water as 6 acres (2.4 ha) and greatest depth 38 feet (12 m). It was to contain 26,000,000 imperial gallons (120,000,000 L; 31,000,000 US gal). The reservoir was built by Bond & Hitchcock, contractors. It was operated by the Taunton Waterworks. The reservoir today has an average depth of 1.33 metres (4 ft 4 in) and a surface area of 2.128 hectares (5.26 acres), with a catchment area of 20.5 hectares (51 acres). The perimeter is 0.6 kilometres (0.37 mi).

Leigh and Luxhay reservoirs are managed today by Wessex Water. In 2013 Wessex Water arranged for installation of physical and electronic security systems in both reservoirs, using a system of pontoons during installation. Leigh Reservoir is accessed via a single entry point on top. A secure access cover was installed, enclosed in a high security cage.

== Water quality ==
During the Routine Monitoring Programme of 1990 the reservoir was listed as containing "abundant" blue-green algae. No bloom or scum were observed, although there was scum on Luxhay Reservoir. Leigh Reservoir is one of three in the Tone catchment that are monitored under the EC Surface Water Abstraction Directive, the others being the Clatworthy Reservoir and Luxhay Reservoir. A 1998 report said that none of these reservoirs had exceeded the standard for dissolved and emulsified hydrocarbons since UV fluorescence tests began in September 1997. As of 2015 water quality was good both chemically and ecologically.

== Sources ==
- Chipchase, Nick (20 April 2009), Leigh Hill Reservoir - plaque
- "Leigh Reservoir", British Lakes
- Leigh Reservoir, Environment Agency
- Miles, Michael (October 2013), Towering Feat of Security for Wessex Water, Technocover
- Mill, Hugh Robert; Salter, Carle (1913), "Division V. - South Western Counties", British Rainfall, 1912 (PDF), London: Edward Stanford
- NRA Report of the Blue-Green Algal Monitoring 1990 (PDF), National Rivers Authority, Anglian Region, June 1991
- Turner, Alan (1998), First Annual Review of the River Tone Catchment Management Plan (PDF), archived from the original (PDF) on 26 August 2016
- Wright, Brian (25 November 2015), Andrew Crosse and the mite that shocked the world: The life and work of an electrical pioneer, Troubador Publishing Ltd, ISBN 978-1-78462-438-5
