= Auchengaich Reservoir =

Reservoir in Argyll and Bute, Scotland

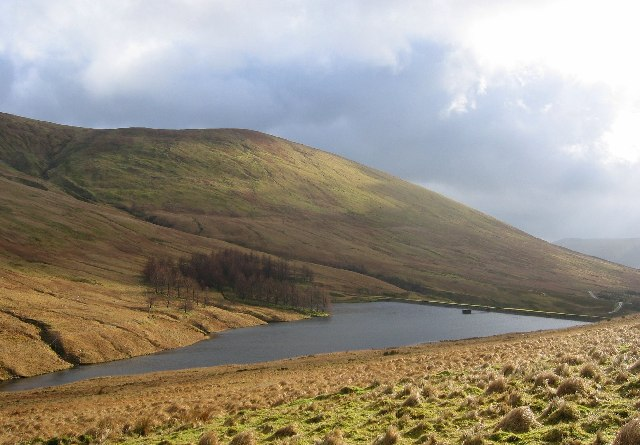

- Location within Scotland
- Location: Glen Fruin, Scotland
- Coordinates: 56.0860°N 4.7705°W
- Type: Reservoir
- Primary outflows: Auchengaich Burn
- Basin countries: Scotland, United Kingdom
- Surface area: 34,000 m^{2} (370,000 sq ft)
- Surface elevation: 244 m (801 ft)

National grid reference NS27609150

Auchengaich Reservoir was created in 1942 through the construction of an earthfill dam built by the military to supply water to Helensburgh and the Gareloch during World War II.

== See also ==
- List of reservoirs and dams in the United Kingdom

== Sources ==
- "Argyll and Bute Council Reservoirs Act 1975 Public Register"
