= Dhu Loch =

Dhu Loch (Loch Dhu)
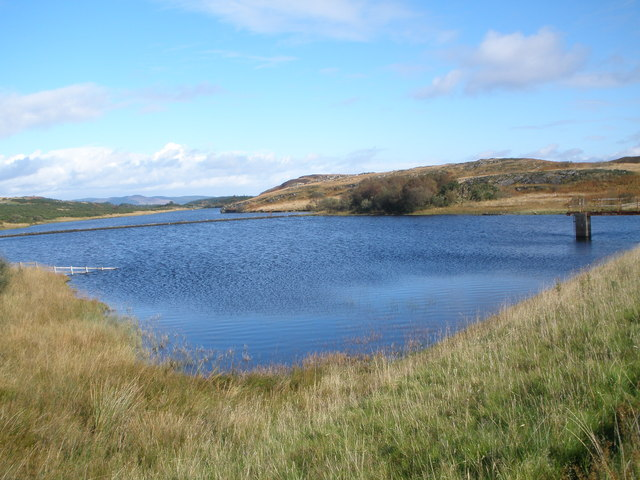

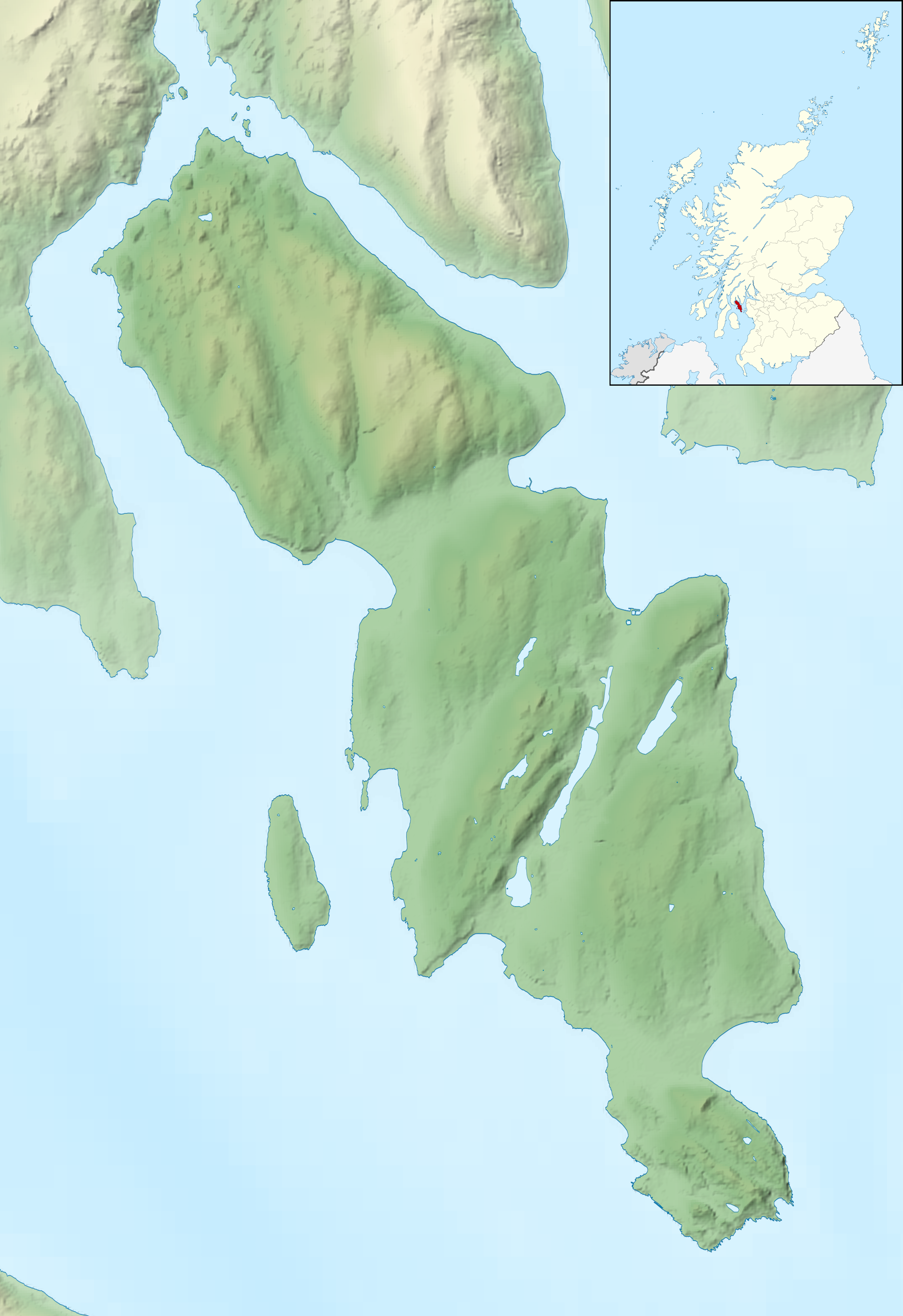
- Location within Bute
- Location: Bute, Scotland
- Coordinates: 55.8095°N 5.0890°W grid reference NS06206132
- Type: Reservoir
- Basin countries: Scotland, United Kingdom
- Surface area: 115,447 m^{2} (1,242,660 sq ft)
- Water volume: 455,386 m^{3} (369.187 acre⋅ft)
- Surface elevation: 98 m (322 ft)

Dhu Loch (also known as "Loch Dhu") is an impounding reservoir, located 1 kilometre directly west of the much larger Loch Fad and 5 kilometres south west of Rothesay. The loch is part of the water supply system for the town. The earthen dam is 8.1 metres high and was completed in 1905.

== See also ==
- List of reservoirs and dams in the United Kingdom

== Sources ==
- "Argyll and Bute Council Reservoirs Act 1975 Public Register"
