= Leorin Loch =

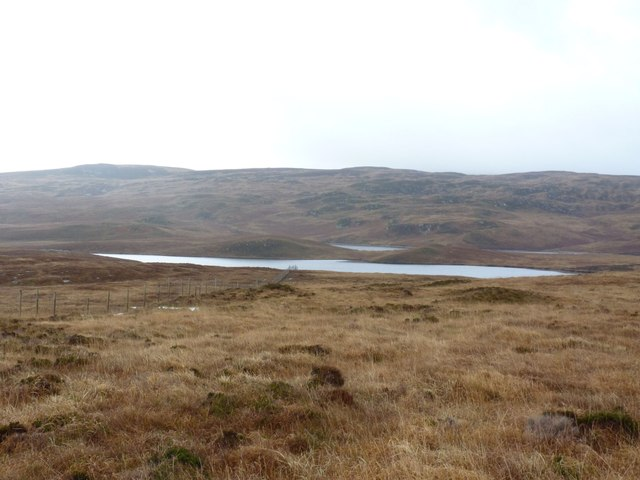
- Leorin Loch

- Location within Argyll and Bute
- Location: Port Ellen, Islay, Scotland
- Coordinates: 55.6599°N 6.1842°W grid reference NR36924866
- Type: Reservoir
- Basin countries: Scotland, United Kingdom
- Surface area: 59,000 m^{2} (640,000 sq ft)
- Surface elevation: 102 m (335 ft)

Leorin Loch is of the impounding variety, located 2.5 kilometres north of Port Ellen, and is one of a group of three lochs supplying water to the island. The earthfill dam is 1.5 metres high.

== See also ==
- List of reservoirs and dams in the United Kingdom

== Sources ==
- "Argyll and Bute Council Reservoirs Act 1975 Public Register"
