= Beochlich =

Beochlich Reservoir
- Location within Scotland
- Location: Inveraray, Scotland
- Coordinates: 56.289669°N 5.186397°W grid reference NN02901560
- Type: Reservoir
- Primary inflows: Beochlich Burn
- Primary outflows: Beochlich Burn
- Basin countries: Scotland, United Kingdom
- Surface area: 57,000 m^{2} (610,000 sq ft)
- Surface elevation: 278 m (912 ft)

Beochlich (the Living Stone) is the name of a hydro electric project (taken from the burn of the same name) to the south-east of Loch Awe, and 9 km north-west of Inveraray. The 6-metre high earth dam was built in 1998 and is owned by an ethical investment fund run by Triodos Bank.

== See also ==
- List of reservoirs and dams in the United Kingdom

== Sources ==
- "Argyll and Bute Council Reservoirs Act 1975 Public Register"
