= Cam Loch =

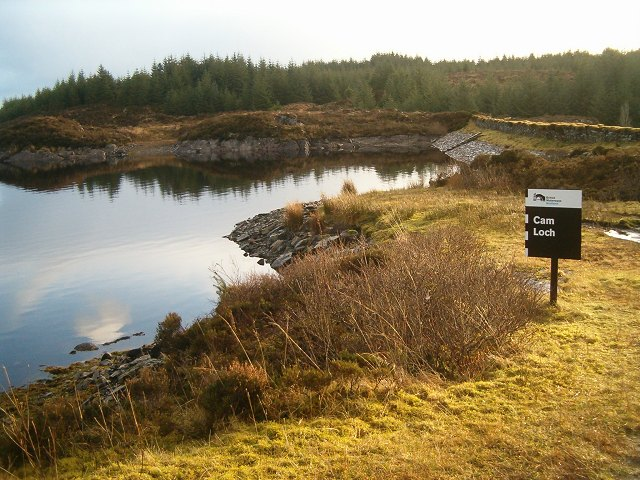

- Location within Scotland
- Location: North Knapdale, Scotland
- Coordinates: 56.0330°N 5.4958°W grid reference NR82308780
- Type: Reservoir
- Basin countries: Scotland, United Kingdom
- Surface area: 284,960 m^{2} (3,067,300 sq ft)
- Water volume: 1,068,000 m^{3} (866 acre⋅ft)

Cam Loch (the Crooked Loch) is one of a number of water supply sources for the Crinan Canal. The impounding reservoir lies to the south of the canal and about 3 kilometres west of Lochgilphead. It has an earthwork dam 8.5 metres high, with records showing that construction was before 1860.

== See also ==
- List of lochs in Scotland
- List of reservoirs and dams in the United Kingdom

== Sources ==
- "Argyll and Bute Council Reservoirs Act 1975 Public Register"
