= Crosshill Loch =

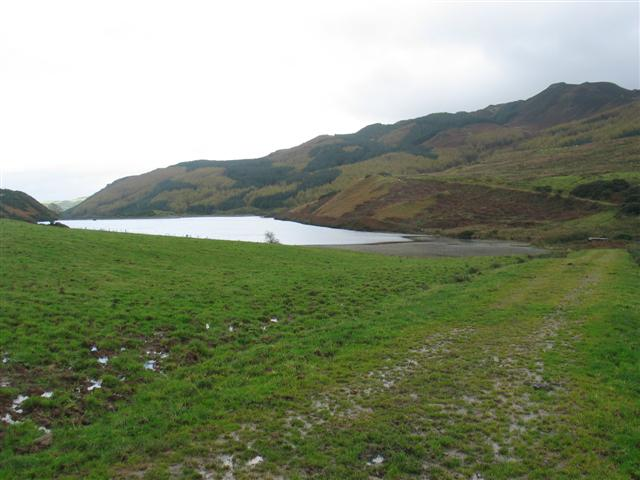
- Photographer Johnny Durnan

- Location within Argyll and Bute
- Location: Campbeltown, Scotland
- Coordinates: 55.4135°N 5.6096°W grid reference NR71771921
- Type: Reservoir
- Basin countries: Scotland, United Kingdom
- Surface area: 78,300 m^{2} (843,000 sq ft)
- Water volume: 172,000 m^{3} (139 acre⋅ft)

Crosshill Loch is an impounding reservoir, located 1 kilometre south of the centre of Campbeltown, and is the source of water for the town's Whisky Distilleries: Springbank, Glengyle and Glen Scotia. The earthen dam is 14.3 metres high. Records show the dam was constructed prior to 1868.

== See also ==
- List of reservoirs and dams in the United Kingdom

== Sources ==
- "Argyll and Bute Council Reservoirs Act 1975 Public Register"
