= Gleann Loch =

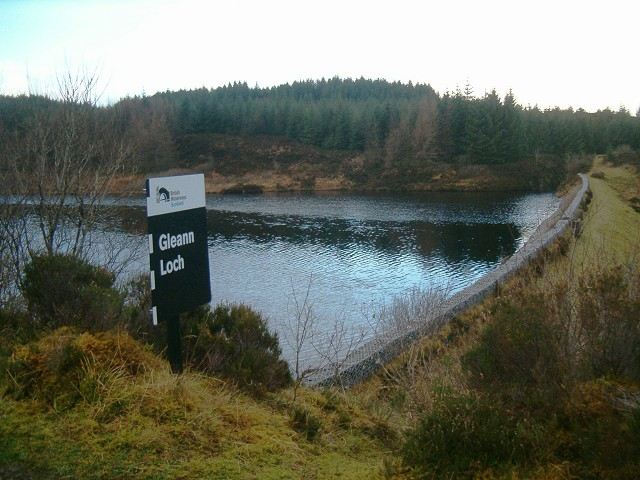

- Location within Argyll and Bute
- Location: North Knapdale, Scotland
- Coordinates: 56.0384°N 5.5051°W grid reference NR81768836
- Type: Reservoir
- Basin countries: Scotland, United Kingdom
- Surface area: 121,000 m^{2} (1,300,000 sq ft)
- Water volume: 495,000 m^{3} (401 acre⋅ft)
- Surface elevation: 209 m (686 ft)

The loch runs south west to north east and is an impounding reservoir located to the west of Lochgilphead, Scotland. It is one of a number of lochs supplying water to the Crinan Canal. The earthen dam is 15 metres high. Records show the dam was constructed before 1860.

== See also ==
- List of reservoirs and dams in the United Kingdom

== Sources ==
- "Argyll and Bute Council Reservoirs Act 1975 Public Register"
- Scotlands Places - Crinan Canal, Glen Clachaig Feeder Reservoir System
