= Lindowan Reservoir =

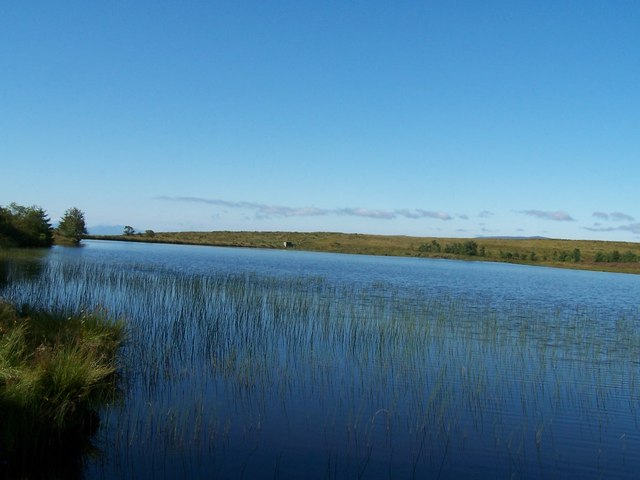

- Location within Argyll and Bute
- Location: Kilcreggan, Scotland
- Coordinates: 55.9939°N 4.8227°W grid reference NS24058147
- Type: Reservoir
- Basin countries: Scotland, United Kingdom
- Surface area: 44,000 m^{2} (470,000 sq ft)
- Water volume: 44,000 m^{3} (36 acre⋅ft)
- Surface elevation: 142 m (466 ft)

Lindowan Reservoir is of the impounding variety, located 1 kilometre north of Kilcreggan. It used to be the main source of water for a nearby threshing mill. The earthfill dam is 3 metres high, and was constructed before 1850.

== See also ==
- List of reservoirs and dams in the United Kingdom

== Sources ==
- "Argyll and Bute Council Reservoirs Act 1975 Public Register"
