= Chelker Reservoir =

Reservoir in North Yorkshire, England

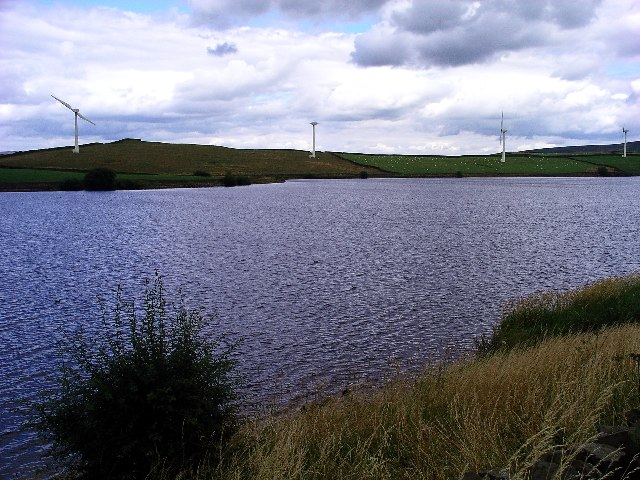
- The reservoir with the former wind farm at the opposite side of the lake.

- Location within North Yorkshire
- Location: Draughton, North Yorkshire
- Coordinates: 53.95997°N 1.91514°W
- Type: Reservoir
- Primary inflows: River Wharfe
- Basin countries: United Kingdom
- Surface area: 52.3 acres (21.2 ha)
- Shore length^{1}: 1.5 miles (2.4 km)
- Surface elevation: 725 feet (221 m) above sea level
- ^{1} Shore length is not a well-defined measure.

Chelker Reservoir is a man-made lake in North Yorkshire, England. It lies in the parish of Draughton, immediately north of the A65 road, between Skipton and the village of Addingham. It was put into service in 1866 and serves the Bradford area; it is currently owned by Yorkshire Water. The reservoir's main inflow is the River Wharfe.

== Chelker Wind Farm ==
In 1992 a wind farm, the third-ever in the United Kingdom, was erected on the north side of the reservoir. The wind farm consisted of four two-bladed turbines which generated 1.2MW and went online in December 1992. They were used to pump water from the River Wharfe up to the reservoir.

In 2013, after permission to enlarge the wind farm was refused, the turbines were demolished.

== See also ==
- List of lakes in England
- List of dams and reservoirs in United Kingdom
