= Kilduskland Reservoir =

Kilduskland Reservoir Dam
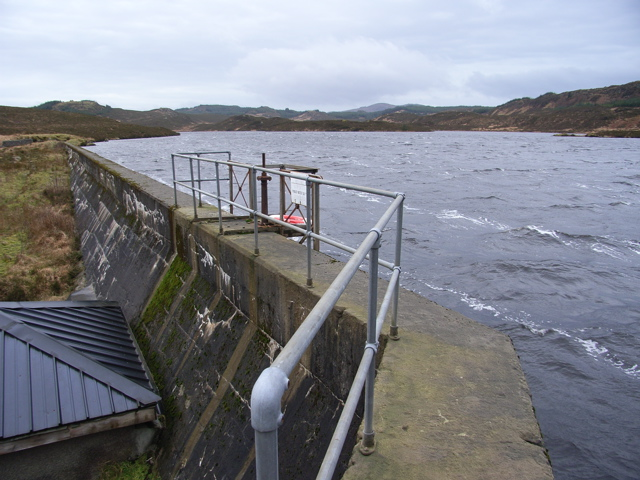

- Location within Argyll and Bute
- Location: Ardrishaig, Scotland
- Coordinates: 56.0195°N 5.4817°W grid reference NR83268635
- Type: Reservoir
- Primary outflows: Kilduskland Burn
- Basin countries: Scotland, United Kingdom
- Surface area: 121,000 m^{2} (30 acres)
- Water volume: 183,000 m^{3} (148 acre⋅ft)
- Surface elevation: 213 m (699 ft)

Kilduskland Reservoir is of the impounding variety and is located 2 kilometres west of Ardrishaig, supplying the village with its water supply. The concrete dam is 9 metres high and it was completed in 1906.

== See also ==
- List of reservoirs and dams in the United Kingdom

== Sources ==
- "Argyll and Bute Council Reservoirs Act 1975 Public Register"
