= Knockruan Loch =

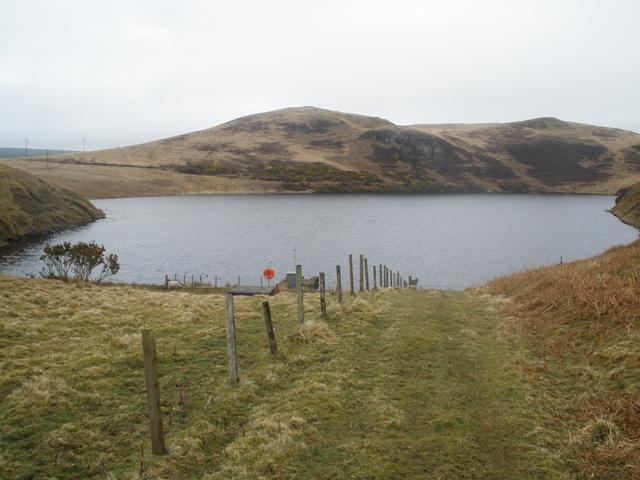

- Location within Argyll and Bute
- Location: Campbeltown, Scotland
- Coordinates: 55.4456°N 5.5870°W grid reference NR73402267
- Type: Reservoir
- Basin countries: Scotland, United Kingdom
- Surface area: 51,970 m^{2} (559,400 sq ft)
- Water volume: 104,000 m^{3} (84 acre⋅ft)
- Surface elevation: 117 m (384 ft)

Knockruan Loch is a reservoir of the impounding variety, located 2.5 kilometres north of Campbeltown, Scotland, and is one of three lochs supplying water to the town. The earthfill dam is 1.82 metres high and was completed in 1931.

== See also ==
- List of reservoirs and dams in the United Kingdom

== Sources ==
- "Argyll and Bute Council Reservoirs Act 1975 Public Register"
