= Ardlussa Fishing Loch =

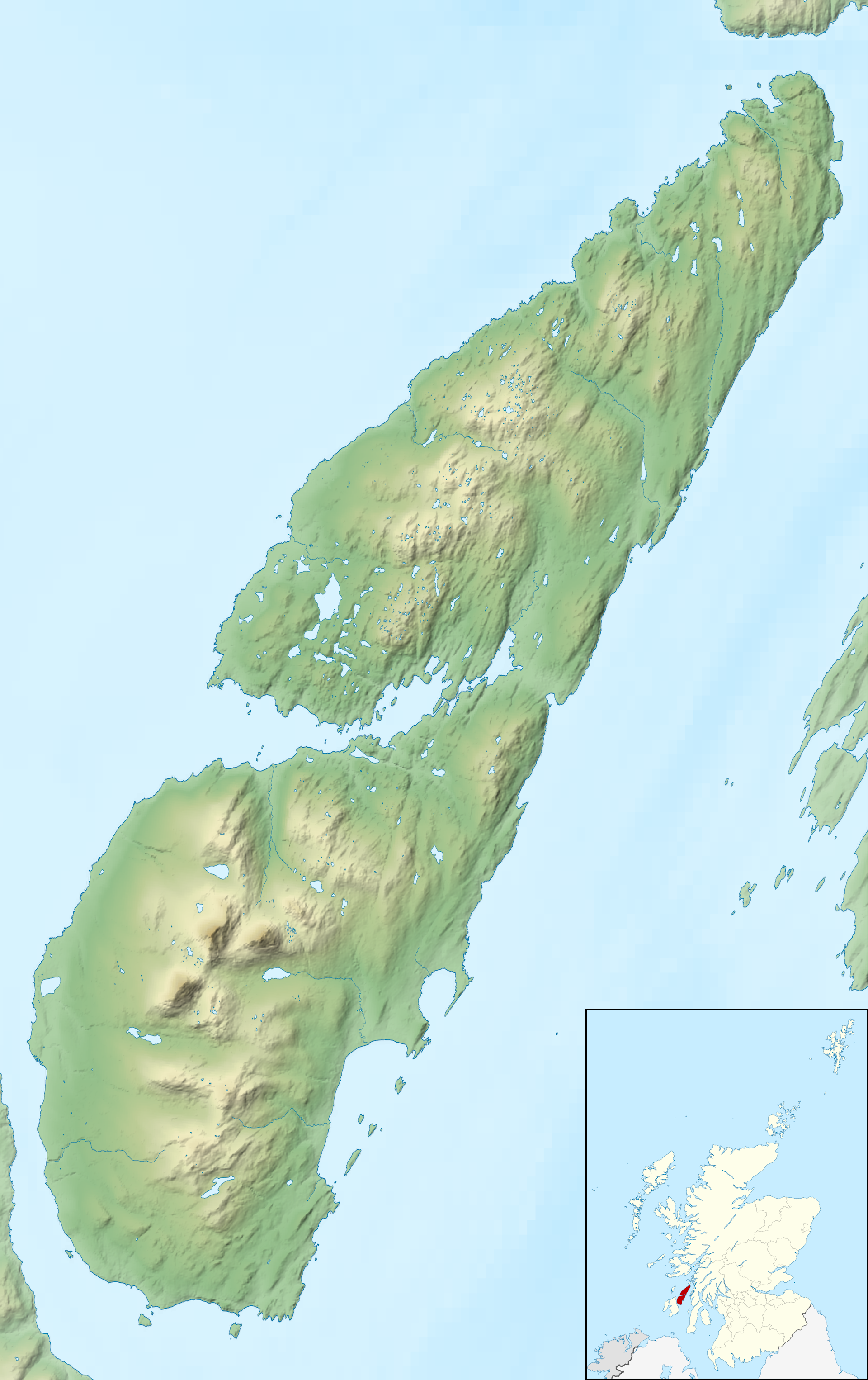
- Location within Jura
- Location: Jura, Scotland
- Coordinates: 56.0325°N 5.7878°W
- Type: Reservoir
- Basin countries: Scotland, United Kingdom
- Surface area: 79,000 m^{2} (850,000 sq ft)
- Surface elevation: 32 m (105 ft)

The Ardlussa Fishing Loch is an impounding reservoir, located 2 kilometres north of Lussagiven on a remote part of the Ardlussa Estate on Jura, Argyll and Bute, Scotland. The earthen dam is 5.5 metres high and was completed in 1900. It is located at Ordnance Survey grid reference NR64128867.

== See also ==
- List of reservoirs and dams in the United Kingdom

== Sources ==
- "Argyll and Bute Council Reservoirs Act 1975 Public Register"
