= Loch a' Chaorainn =

Lake in Scotland

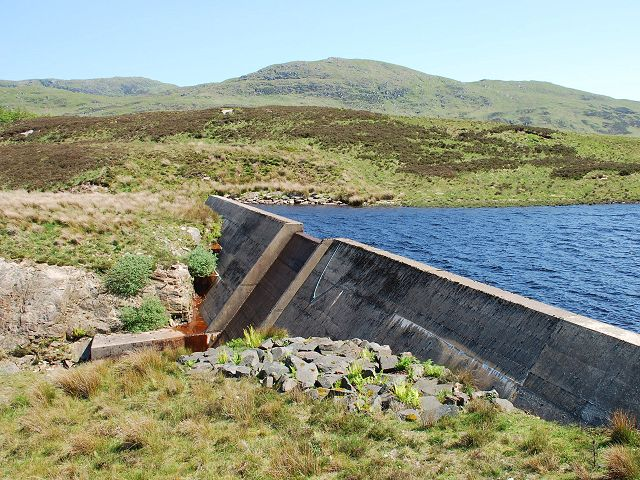

- Location within Argyll and Bute
- Location: South Knapdale, Scotland
- Coordinates: 55.9193°N 5.5582°W grid reference NR77787535
- Type: Reservoir
- Basin countries: Scotland, United Kingdom
- Surface area: 123,200 m^{2} (1,326,000 sq ft)
- Water volume: 305,000 m^{3} (247 acre⋅ft)
- Surface elevation: 155 m (509 ft)

Loch a' Chaorainn (Loch of the Rowan) is a lake dammed as an impounding reservoir which lies 9 kilometres (5.6 mi) north west of Tarbert. The concrete dam is 8.2 metres (27 ft) high and was completed in 1995.

== See also ==
- List of reservoirs and dams in the United Kingdom

== Sources ==
- "Argyll and Bute Council Reservoirs Act 1975 Public Register"
