= Crarae Reservoir =

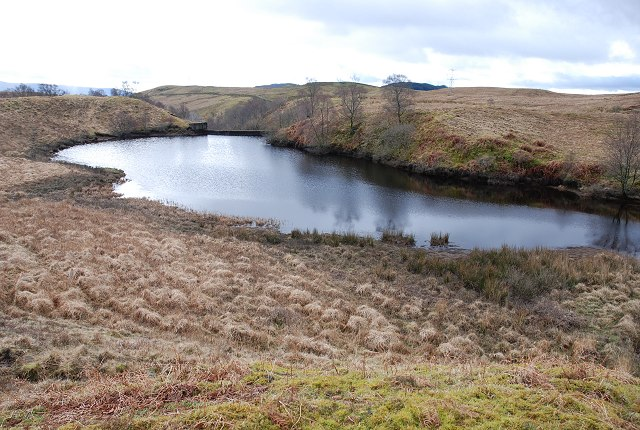

- Location within Scotland
- Location: Minard, Scotland
- Coordinates: 56.1386°N 5.2616°W grid reference NR97429874
- Type: Reservoir
- Primary inflows: Allt Mealach
- Primary outflows: Allt Mealach
- Basin countries: Scotland, United Kingdom
- Surface area: 4,636 m^{2} (49,900 sq ft)
- Water volume: 2,400 m^{3} (1.9 acre⋅ft)

The Crarae Reservoir is located 2.5 kilometres north west of the village of Crarae, on the west side of Loch Fyne. The concrete dam is 13.7 metres high.

== See also ==
- List of reservoirs and dams in the United Kingdom

== Sources ==
- "Argyll and Bute Council Reservoirs Act 1975 Public Register"
