= Kirk Dam =

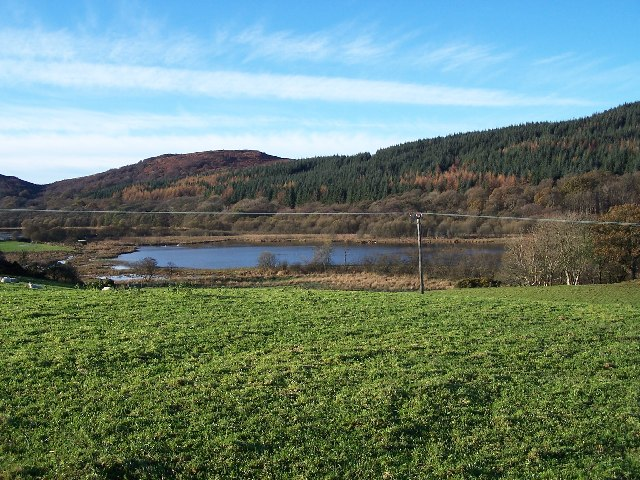

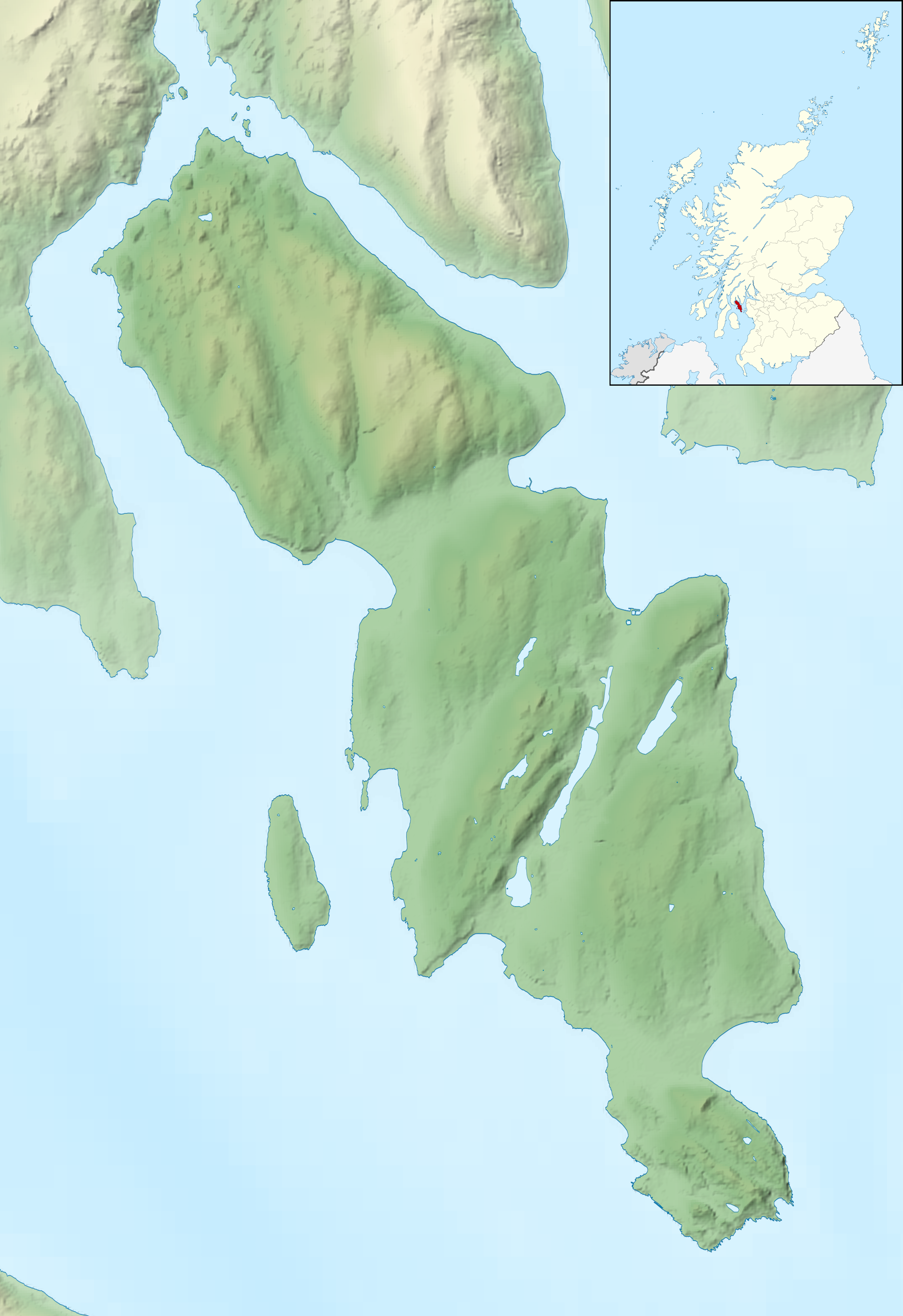
- Location within Bute
- Location: Bute, Scotland
- Coordinates: 55.8196°N 5.0641°W; OS grid reference NS08426373
- Type: Reservoir
- Basin countries: Scotland, United Kingdom
- Built: Late 18th century
- Surface area: 180,200 square metres (1,940,000 sq ft)
- Water volume: 3.9 million cubic metres (3,200 acre⋅ft)
- Surface elevation: 11 metres (36 ft)

Kirk Dam is an impounding dam, located 1.5 kilometres south of Rothesay, and is separated by a causeway from the much larger Loch Fad to the south-west. It was built to provide water to the cotton mills of the town, and is now the habitat for a variety of marshland birds. The earthfill dam is 6 metres high and records show it was constructed in the late 18th century.

== See also ==
- List of reservoirs and dams in the United Kingdom
