= Loch an Sgoltaire =

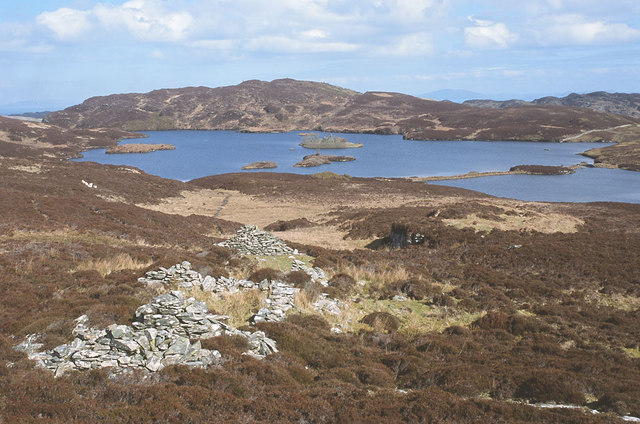

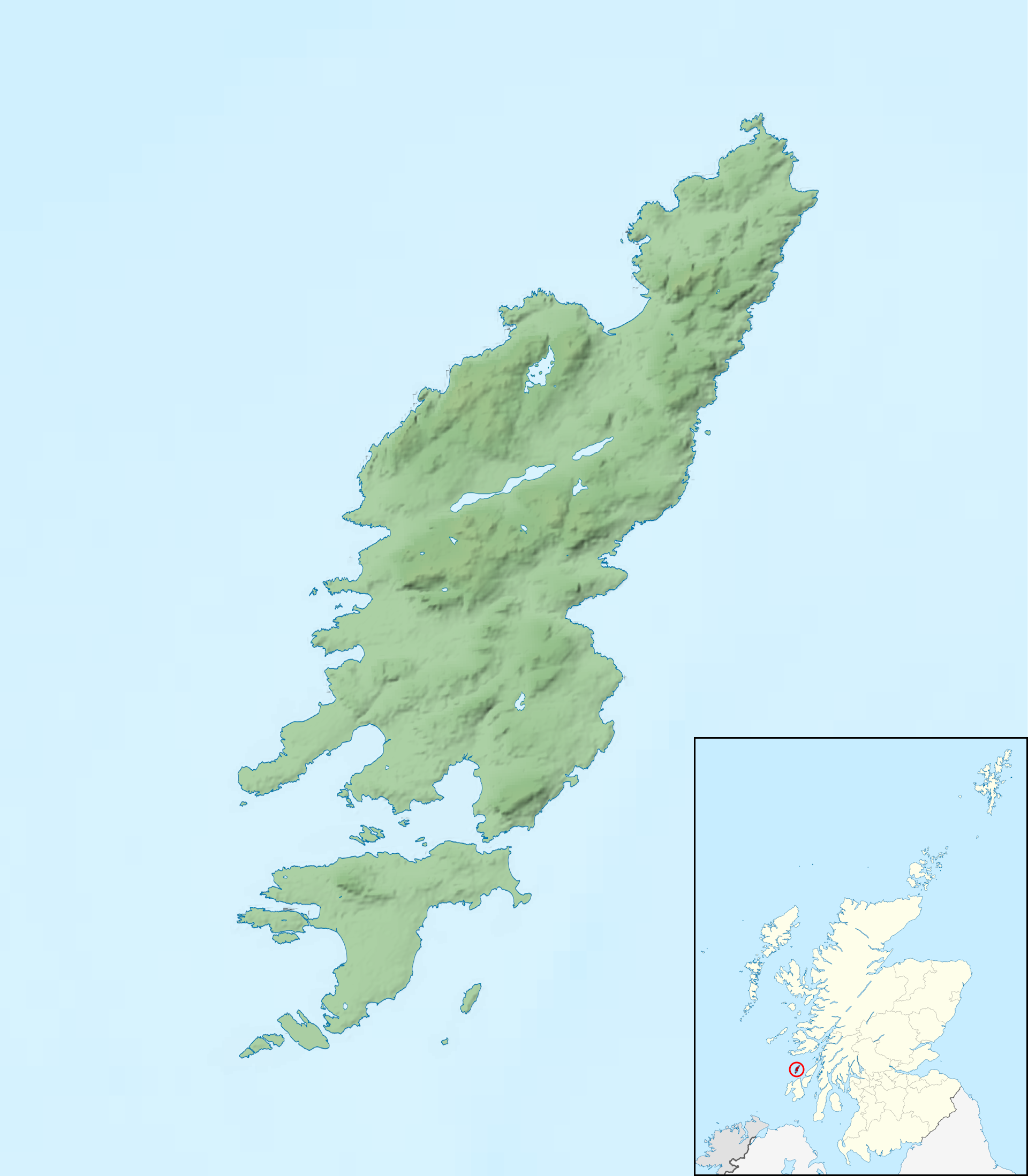
- Location within Colonsay
- Location: Colonsay, Scotland
- Coordinates: 56.0966°N 6.2033°W
- Type: reservoir
- Basin countries: United Kingdom
- Surface area: 140,700 m^{2} (1,514,000 sq ft)
- Surface elevation: 60 m (200 ft)

Loch an Sgoltaire is an impounding reservoir located on the Inner Hebridean island of Colonsay, Scotland. It is located at grid reference NR386972, northwest of Kiloran and is the main source of fresh water for the island. The concrete dam was constructed in 1982 and is 3.1 metres high.

On one of the islands in the loch is a ruined castle similar to Loch Gorm Castle, Islay.

== See also ==
- List of reservoirs and dams in the United Kingdom
