= Gleann Dubh =

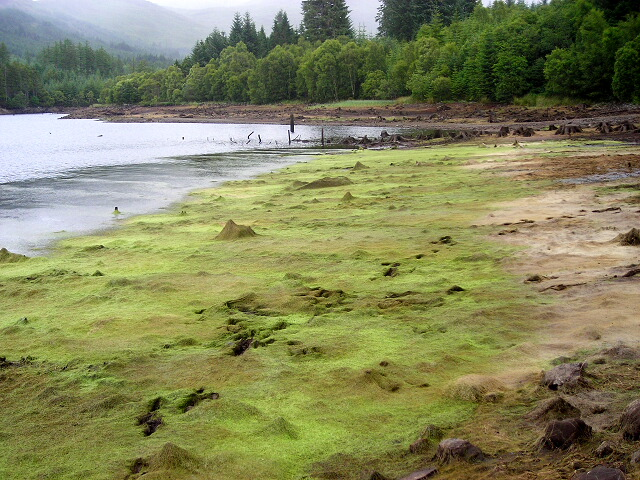

- Location within Argyll and Bute
- Location: Barcaldine, Scotland
- Coordinates: 56.5287°N 5.2878°W grid reference NM97804230
- Type: Reservoir
- Basin countries: Scotland, United Kingdom
- Surface area: 166,000 m^{2} (1,790,000 sq ft)
- Surface elevation: 32 m (105 ft)

The reservoir (the "Black Glen") is an impounding reservoir located 9 kilometres north east of the Connel Bridge in Barcaldine Forest. The earthen dam is 23.4 metres high and was completed in 1984. The reservoir provides a supply of water for the hydroelectric scheme at the Marine Resource Centre in the village of Barcaldine.

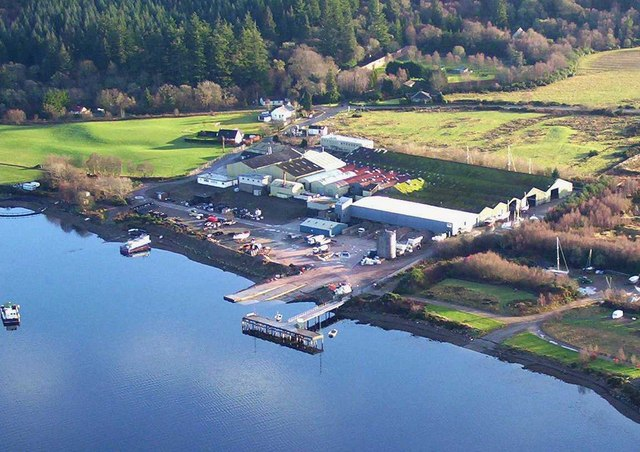
The Marine Resource Centre, Barcaldine

== See also ==
- List of reservoirs and dams in the United Kingdom

== Sources ==
- "Argyll and Bute Council Reservoirs Act 1975 Public Register"
- "The Forests of North Argyll" - The Forestry Commission
