= Blackstone Edge Reservoir =

Reservoir in Greater Manchester, England

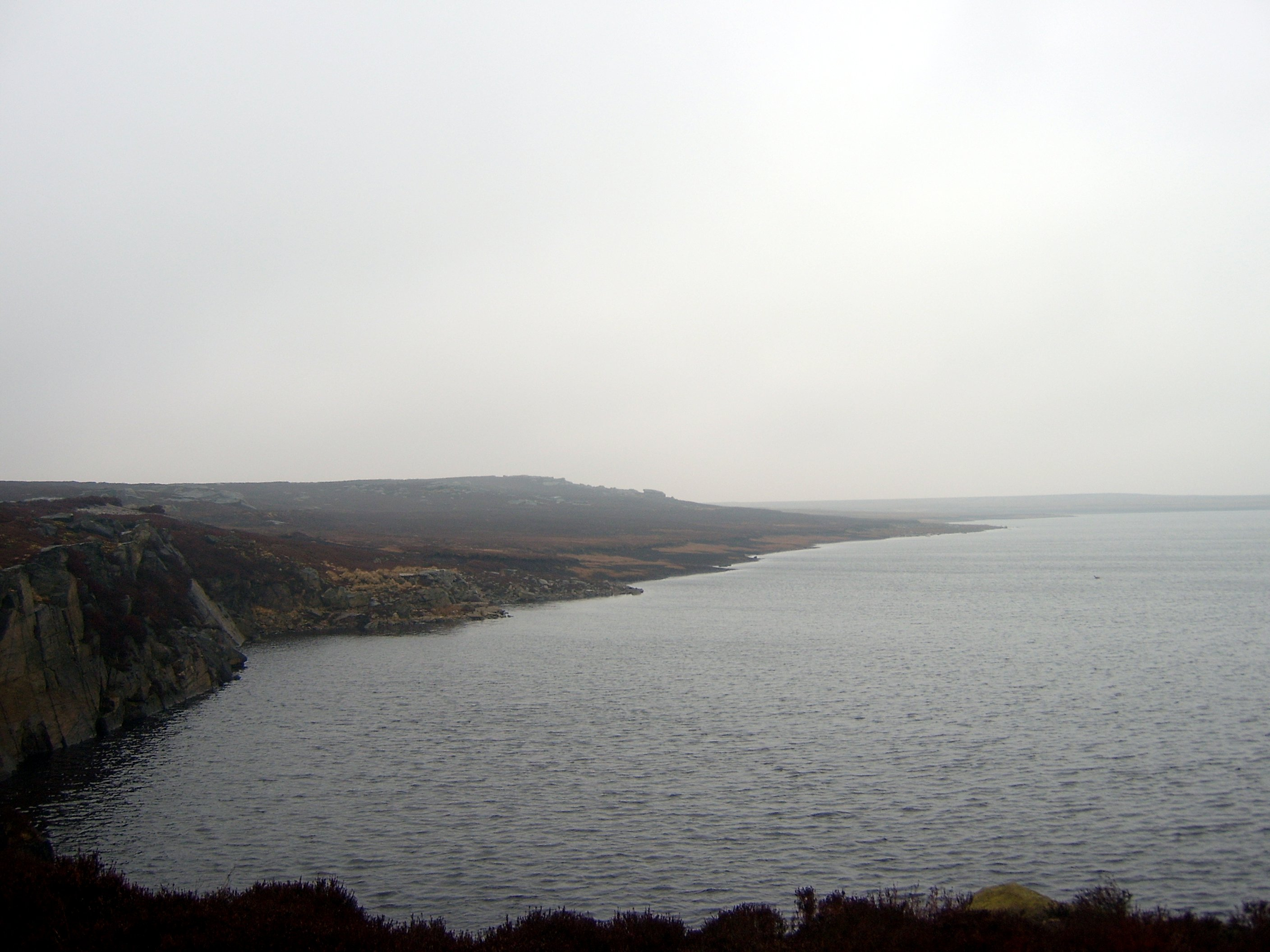

- Location within Greater Manchester
- Location: Greater Manchester
- Coordinates: 53°39′38″N 2°2′38″W
- Type: reservoir
- Basin countries: United Kingdom

Blackstone Edge Reservoir is a reservoir in the Metropolitan Borough of Rochdale, Greater Manchester, England. It is close to Blackstone Edge, from which it takes its name, and the border with Calderdale, West Yorkshire.

== History ==
Blackstone Edge Reservoir was created in 1798 by William Jessop and the Rochdale Canal Company to supply the Rochdale Canal, which could not be supplied by rivers or streams. The reservoir was planned to be around 20 hectares. This reservoir could hold over 28 million cubic feet of water.

During World War II, barges were placed in the reservoir to prevent German forces to land water planes there. The barges were discovered when the reservoir was drained several decades later.

The reservoir is currently owned by United Utilities.
