= Helensburgh No. 2 Reservoir =

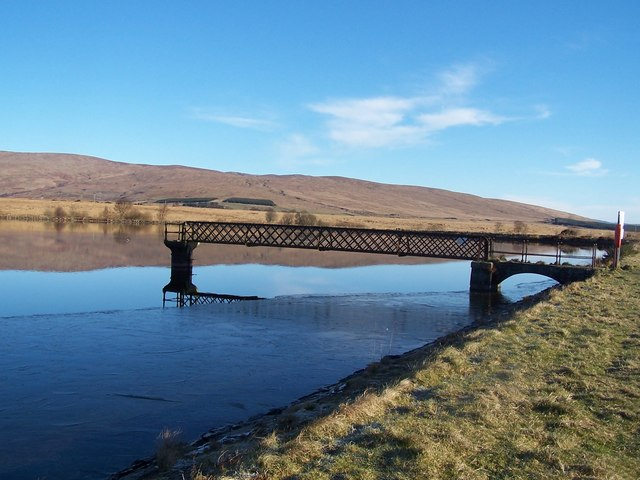

- Location within Argyll and Bute
- Location: Helensburgh, Scotland
- Coordinates: 56.0219°N 4.7210°W grid reference NS30438431
- Type: Reservoir
- Basin countries: Scotland, United Kingdom
- Surface area: 53,707 m^{2} (578,100 sq ft)
- Water volume: 229,000 m^{3} (186 acre⋅ft)
- Surface elevation: 113 m (371 ft)

The reservoir was of the non-impounding variety. It is no longer part of the local water supply system and, as with reservoir No. 3, is drained and no longer holds water. The earthen dam is 9 metres high and records show it was constructed before 1875.

== See also ==
- List of reservoirs and dams in the United Kingdom

== Sources ==
- "Argyll and Bute Council Reservoirs Act 1975 Public Register"
