= Loch Turret =

Loch in Perth and Kinross, Scotland

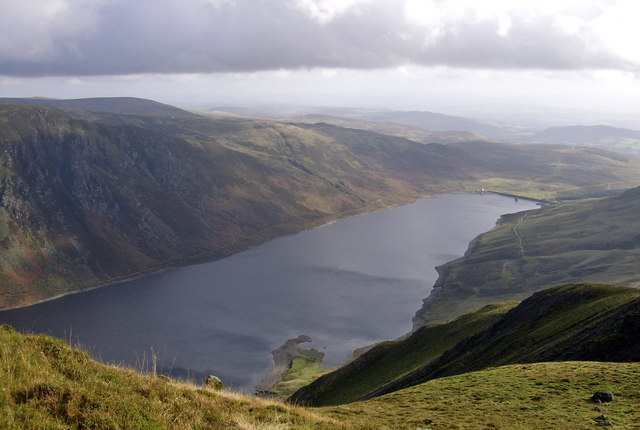
- Loch Turret Reservoir Overlooking the steep crags of Carn Chois looking east south east down Loch Turret reservoir. Also shows the track along both sides of the loch.

- Location within Perth and Kinross
- Location: NN80752790
- Coordinates: 56.42490005°N 3.93203381°W
- Type: freshwater reservoir
- Max. length: 3.6 km (2.2 mi)
- Max. width: 0.55 km (0.34 mi)
- Surface area: 173 ha (430 acres)
- Average depth: 31.8241 ft (9.7000 m)
- Max. depth: 79.068 ft (24.100 m)
- Water volume: 590,961,954 ft^{3} (16,734,179.0 m^{3})
- Shore length^{1}: 8 km (5.0 mi)
- Surface elevation: 358 m (1,175 ft)
- Islands: 0
- ^{1} Shore length is not a well-defined measure.

Loch Turret is a large freshwater reservoir on a north-east to south-west orientation, that is located at the head of Glen Turret and 5.39 miles (8.67 km) northwest of Crieff in Perth and Kinross.

At the north end of the loch, some 1.2 miles (1.9 km), is the small lochan of Lochan Uaine, that drains in Loch Turret through the Turret Burn. The route is a popular walking spot. Below the loch, the Turret Burn continues, and further down hosts Glenturret distillery, that was built in 1775.

== Gallery ==
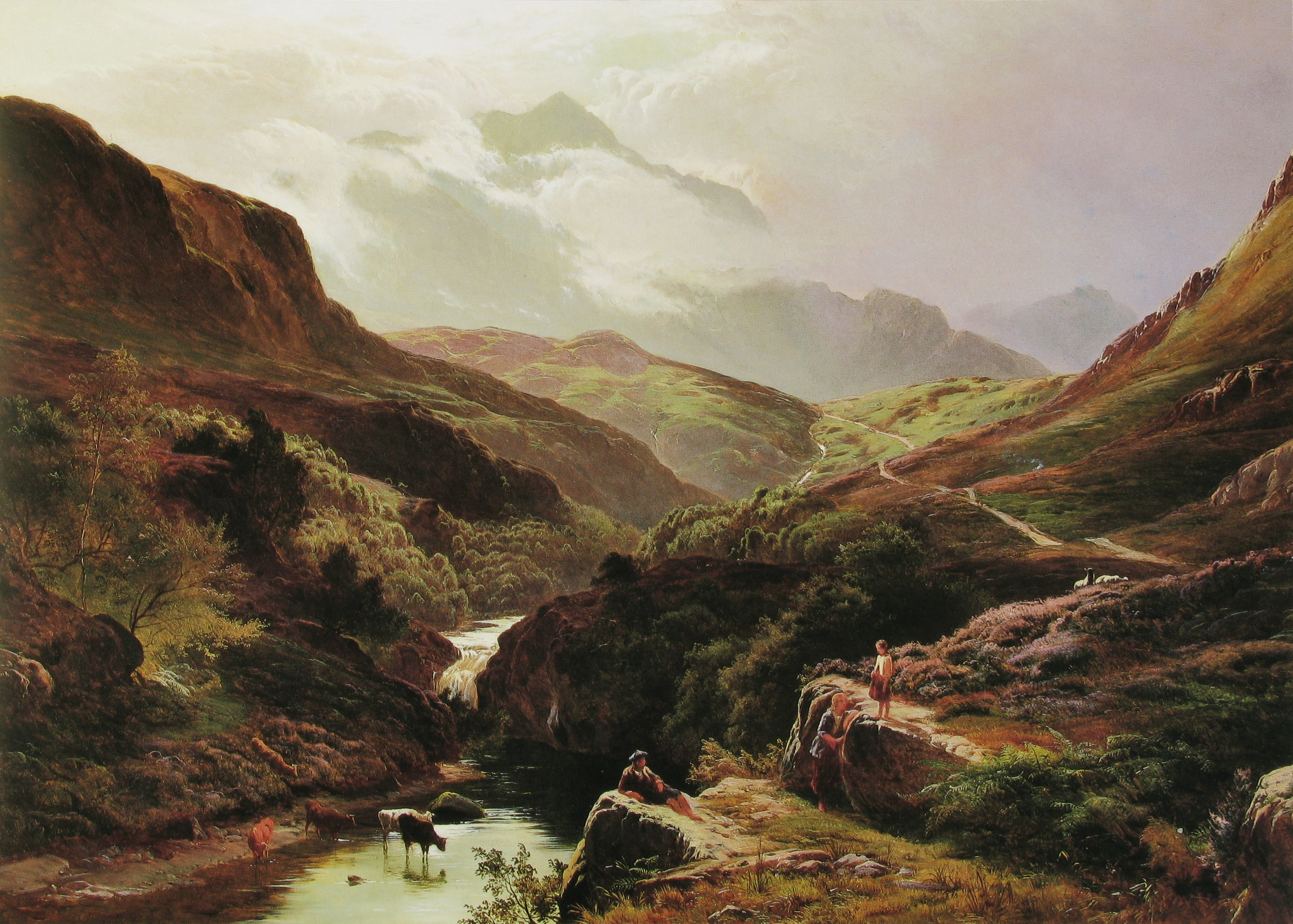
Percy road to Loch Turret, Crieff, Perthshire

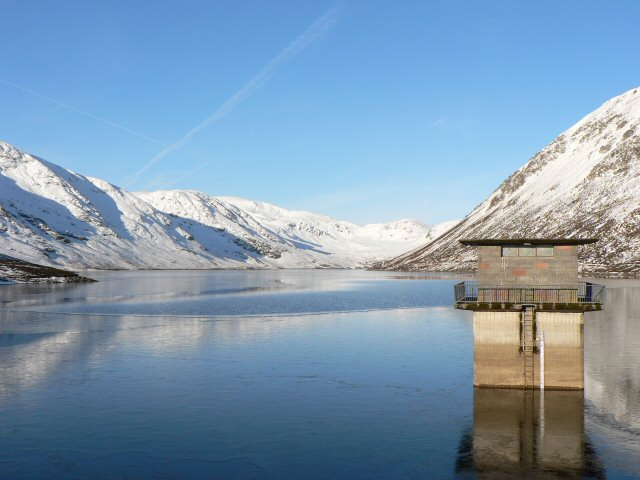
Loch Turret reservoir is at its best on a sunny winter day

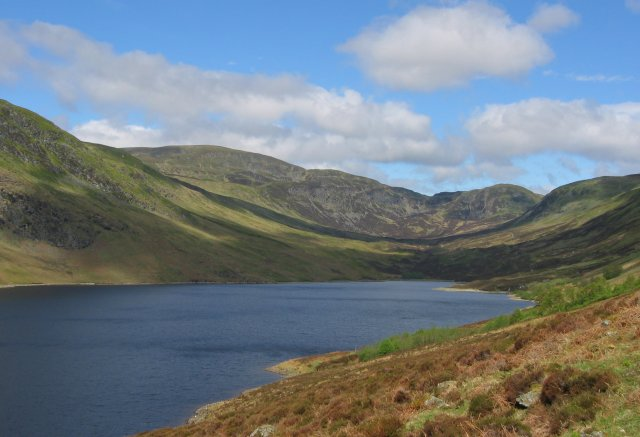
Loch Turret. This is the area that was occupied by the original, natural Loch Turret which was about a mile long. The glen is dominated by the 931m high Ben Chonzie.

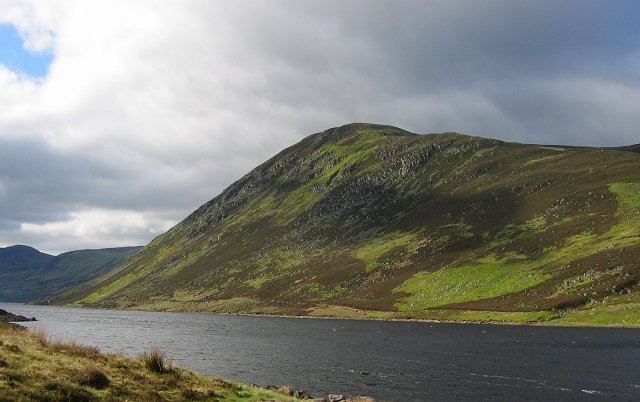
Loch Turret. Looking across the reservoir to Choinneachain Hill. The striking greens are due to the spring growth of Blaeberry/Wimberry (Vaccinium myrtillus)

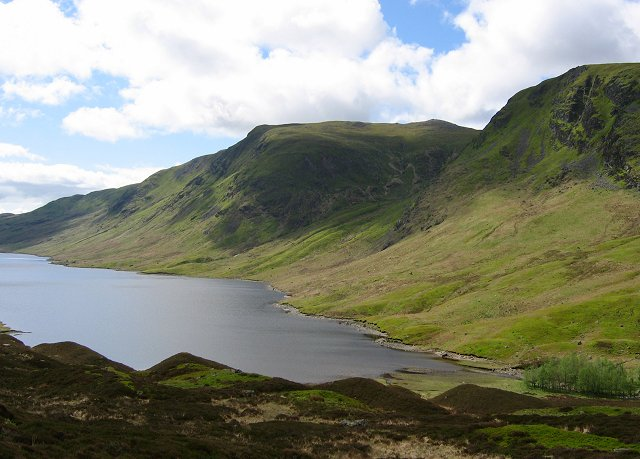
Head of Loch Turret. Looking down on the end of the reservoir. There is a lot of hummocky land here, these hills were often thought of as fairy dwellings, but are piles of stones and gravel left by streams flowing off melting glaciers.
