= Grimsbury Reservoir =

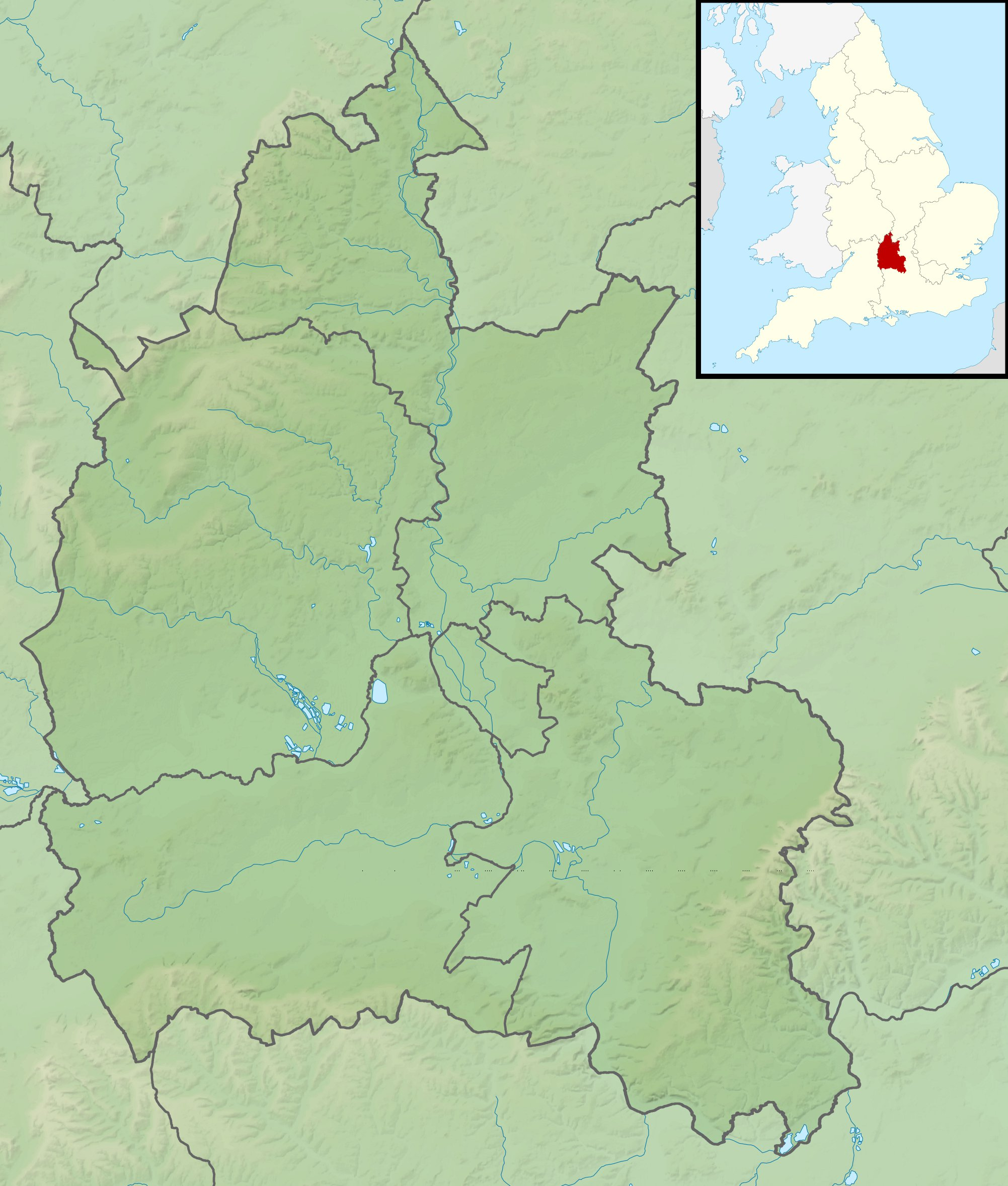
- Location within Oxfordshire
- Location: Oxfordshire
- Coordinates: 52°4′32″N 1°19′53″W
- Type: reservoir
- Primary inflows: River Cherwell
- Basin countries: United Kingdom
- Average depth: 8 ft (2.4 m)
- Water volume: 275 Ml (60×10^{6} imp gal)

Grimsbury Reservoir is a relatively small reservoir owned by Thames Water just off Hennef Way, near the Grimsbury estate of Banbury, Oxfordshire.

A waterworks was built prior to 1947 and was expanded in the early 1960s, when Grimsbury Reservoir was built.

The reservoir is surrounded by a nature reserve and is fed by the River Cherwell, the water itself includes many species of wildlife and the site includes parking facilities and other amenities. It is often used for water sports such as sailing and kayaking clubs as well as angling. The average depth is 8 ft (2.4 m).
