= Bollinhurst Reservoir =

Water reservoir

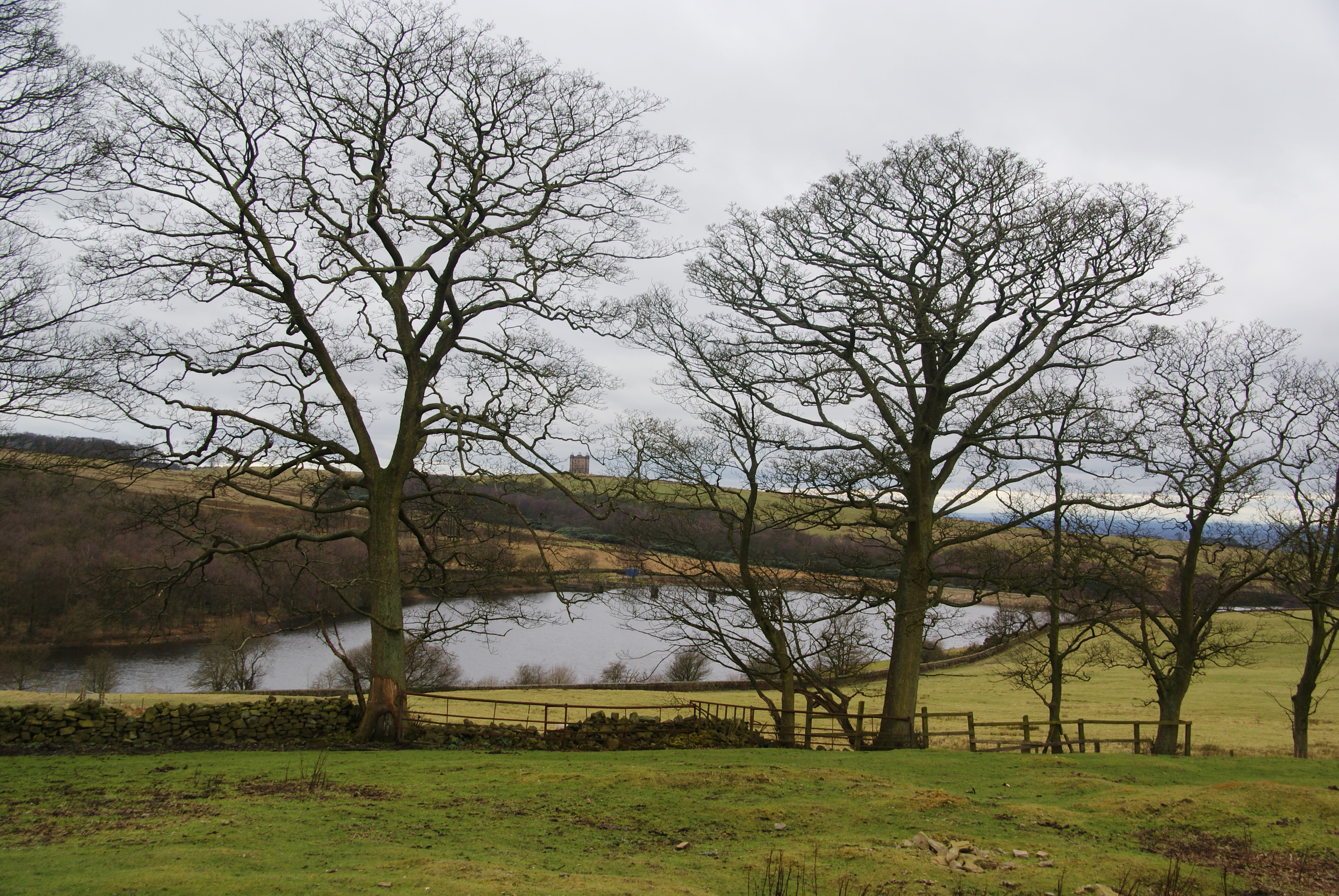

- Location within England
- Coordinates: 53°20′55″N 2°2′19″W
- Type: Reservoir
- Basin countries: United Kingdom
- Water volume: 84,460,000 imperial gallons (384,000 m^{3})

The Bollinhurst Reservoir was constructed in Lyme Park in 1872 for the Stockport District Waterworks Company. At the time of the First World War, it had a capacity of 84.46 million gallons.
