= Loch Sloy (reservoir) =

- Scottish Gaelic Loch Slòigh
- Interactive map of Loch Sloy
- Location: Arrochar Alps, Southern Scottish Highlands
- Coordinates: 56.270°N 4.775°W
- Type: Reservoir
- Etymology: Loch of the host
- Primary inflows: Streams
- Basin countries: United Kingdom (Scotland)
- Managing agency: SSE plc
- Max. length: 3 km (1.9 mi)
- Max. width: 0.45 km (0.28 mi)
- Surface area: 1.26 km^{2} (0.49 sq mi)
- Average depth: 2.5 m (8 ft 2 in)
- Max. depth: 9.6 m (31 ft)
- Shore length^{1}: 7 km (4.3 mi)
- Surface elevation: 287 m (942 ft)
- ^{1} Shore length is not a well-defined measure.

Loch Sloy (Scottish Gaelic: Loch Slòigh) is a freshwater loch in the southern Highlands of Scotland located in the Argyll and Bute council area. It is notable for being a part of a large hydroelectric scheme called the Loch Sloy Hydro-Electric Scheme.

== History ==
Clan MacFarlane, a Scottish Clan, has a close history with the loch, holding land around the loch from 1225 to 1784 and for a significant amount of time there was a clachan due to the clans presence there. The slogan and warcry of the clan is Loch Sloy due to its importance in its history.

In 1945 the Loch became site of a large construction project as part of the Loch Sloy Hydro-electric scheme by the North of Scotland Hydro Electricity Board. A large amount of the construction was done by German prisoners of war. The hydroelectric building and dam opened in 1950 which has since been designated by Historic Scotland as A and B listed respectively.

== Geography ==
On the west side of the loch sits Ben Vane and on its east is Ben Vorlich both of which are Munros. A few miles west is the large Loch Lomond. A private road which walkers often use connects it to the nearby A85 and settlement of Inveruglas.

== Fauna ==
The reservoir provides a safeguard population of Powan a freshwater fish thats native population within Scotland is confined to nearby Loch Lomond and Loch Eck and the Carron Valley Reservoir. Along with this the common Snipe can often be seen near the loch.
