= Dingle Reservoir =

Reservoir in Greater Manchester, England

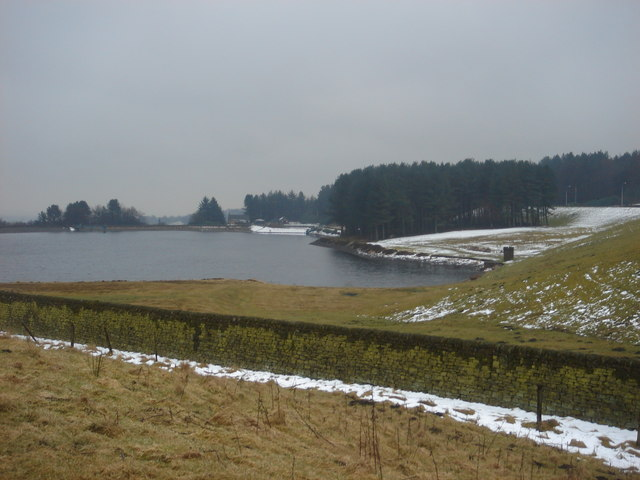
- The Dingle Reservoir

- Shown within Blackburn with Darwen
- Location: Lancashire, England
- Coordinates: 53°37′38″N 2°27′54″W

Dingle Reservoir is an artificial, low alkalinity, shallow reservoir near the town of Egerton, Greater Manchester. It is a little under 400 metres from the border between Lancashire and Greater Manchester, on the Lancashire side.
