= Green Withens Reservoir =

Reservoir in West Yorkshire, England

Coordinates: 53.643336°N 2.018427°W

Green Withens Reservoir is a man-made upland reservoir that lies on Rishworth Moor in West Yorkshire, England. The reservoir sits between the M62 motorway to the south and the A58 to the north, and just to the east of the boundary with Greater Manchester.

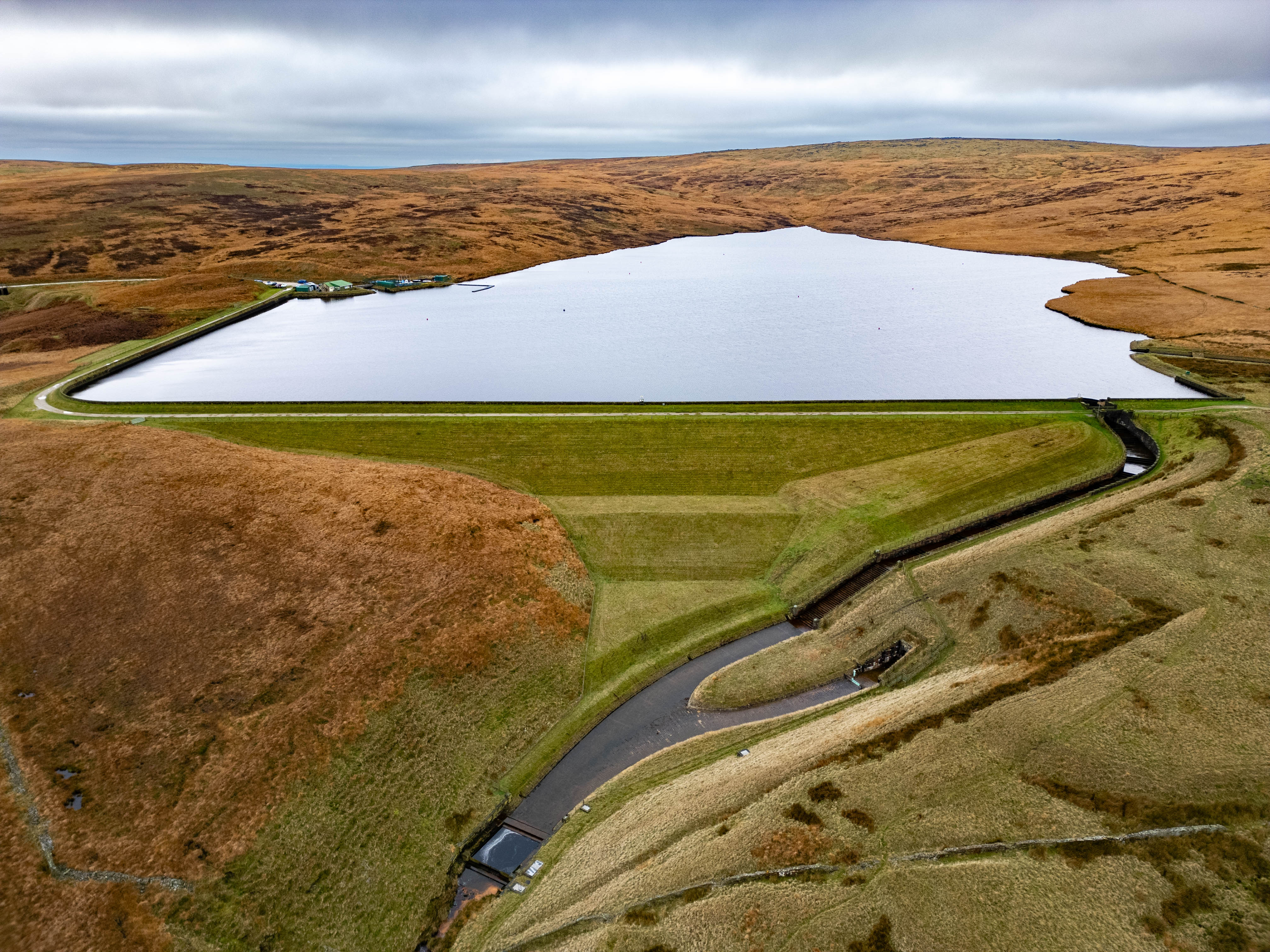
Aerial view of Green Withens Reservoir

The reservoir is primarily in the catchment of Green Withens Clough but also Wolden Edge Clough. The catchment of the reservoir itself is extended to the east of its dam using Green Withens Catchwater, a conduit that channels water from several tributaries to Green Withens Clough back into the reservoir. The reservoir catchment is also extended to the south using Linsgreave Catchwater, which channels water from tributaries of Linsgreave Clough and Lodge Clough back into the reservoir.

Green Withens dam is a reverse ‘L’ shaped stone-faced earth embankment dam that has a leg extending north-north-west over Green Withens Clough on the long leg and Wolden Edge Clough on the shorter leg.

The reservoir, which sits at an altitude of 362 metres above sea level, has a mean depth of 6.2 metres, a catchment area of 221 ha, and a surface area of 0.187 km2.

== History ==
Using powers granted under section 13 of the Wakefield Corporation Waterworks Act 1880, the reservoir, and associated catchwaters, were built by Wakefield Corporation. The wider scheme, enabled by the 1880 act, included Ringstone Edge Reservoir near Ripponden, Ardsley Reservoir, filter beds at Kirkham, a service reservoir at Lindle Hill, an extensive array of catchwater conduits and various interconnecting pipe runs. The pipe networks are for both supply and compensation purposes. Modifications to the Linsgreave Catchwater were likely made during the construction of the M62 motorway.

Green Withens Reservoir is now operated by Yorkshire Water and is part of the Booth Wood / Ryburn Group. Green Withens is a feeder reservoir to Booth Wood Reservoir via Booth Dean Upper Reservoir and Booth Dean Lower Reservoir. The Booth Wood / Ryburn Group of reservoirs provide water to Wakefield, Dewsbury and Greater Huddersfield.

The reservoir is home to Green Withens Watersports Centre, which is operated by the Scouts and has a club house and facilities at the south end of the dam.
