= Williestruther Loch =

Loch in the Scottish Borders

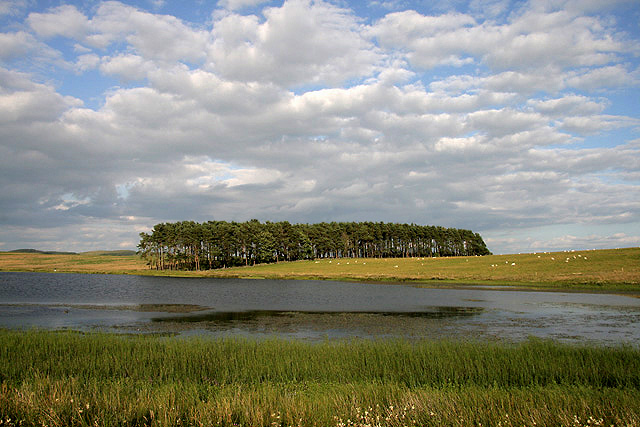
- Williestruther Loch from its western shore

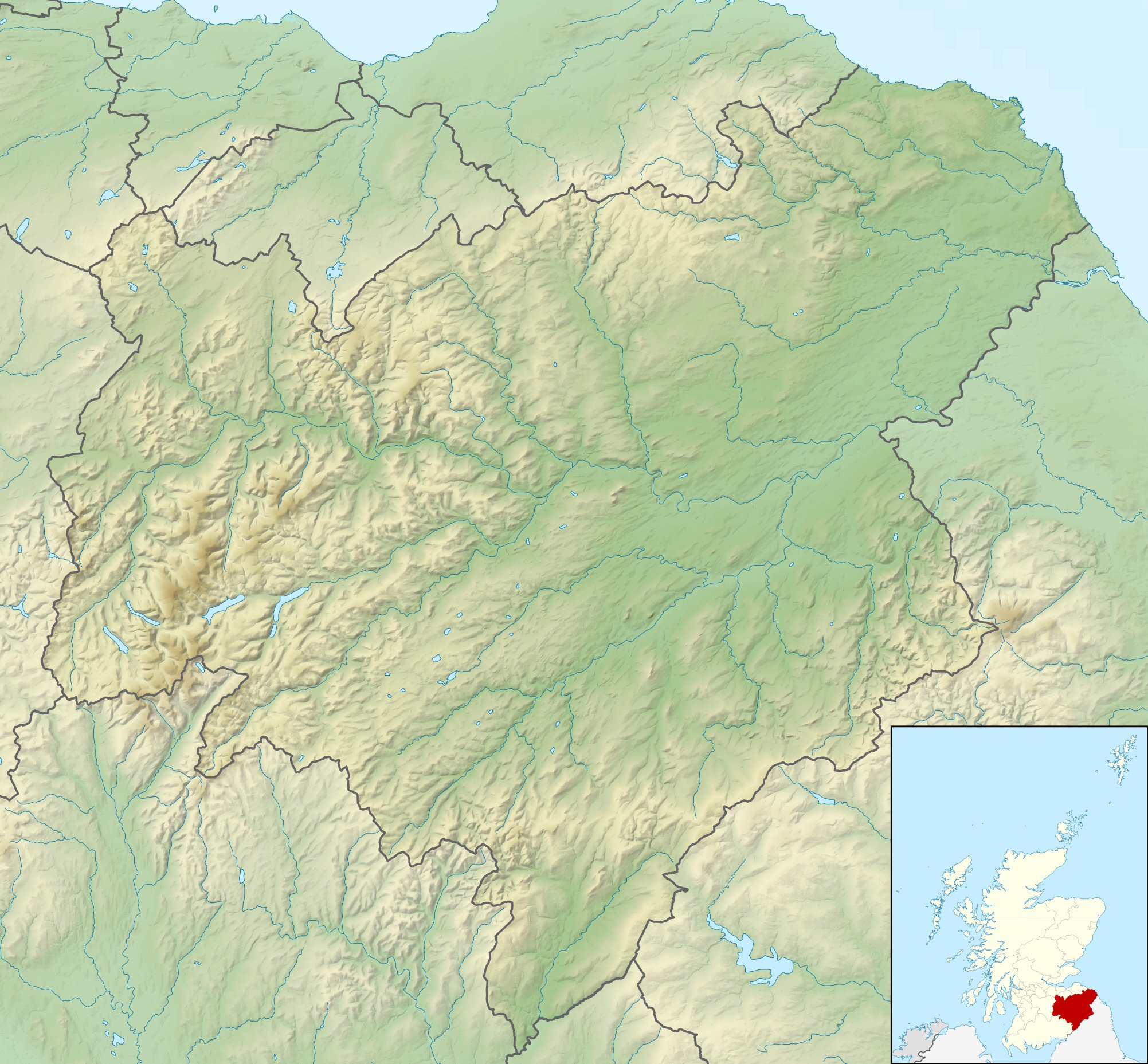
- Location within Scottish Borders
- Location: Scottish Borders
- Coordinates: 55°23′40.6″N 2°48′16.9″W
- Primary outflows: Flex Burn
- Basin countries: Scotland, United Kingdom
- Max. length: 504 m (1,654 ft)
- Max. width: 164.8 m (541 ft)
- Surface elevation: 208.6 m (684 ft)

Williestruther Loch is a lochan (small loch) in the Scottish Borders, just 2.2 kilometres (1.4 mi) south of Hawick. The loch sits at the head of Flex Burn.

Its name derives from the Scots word for marsh, "struther" and the diminutive form of William, ergo: "William's Marsh". This refers to the site on which the loch now sits, which, prior to damworks in the 19th century, was a boggy wetland.

Beneath the loch is a bed of till and diamicton dating to the last Ice Age.

Today, Williestruther Loch is maintained by Hawick Angling Club for fishing rainbow trout. An access carpark and several nature trails were built in the late-2010s.
