= Dean Mills Reservoir =

Reservoir in Greater Manchester, England

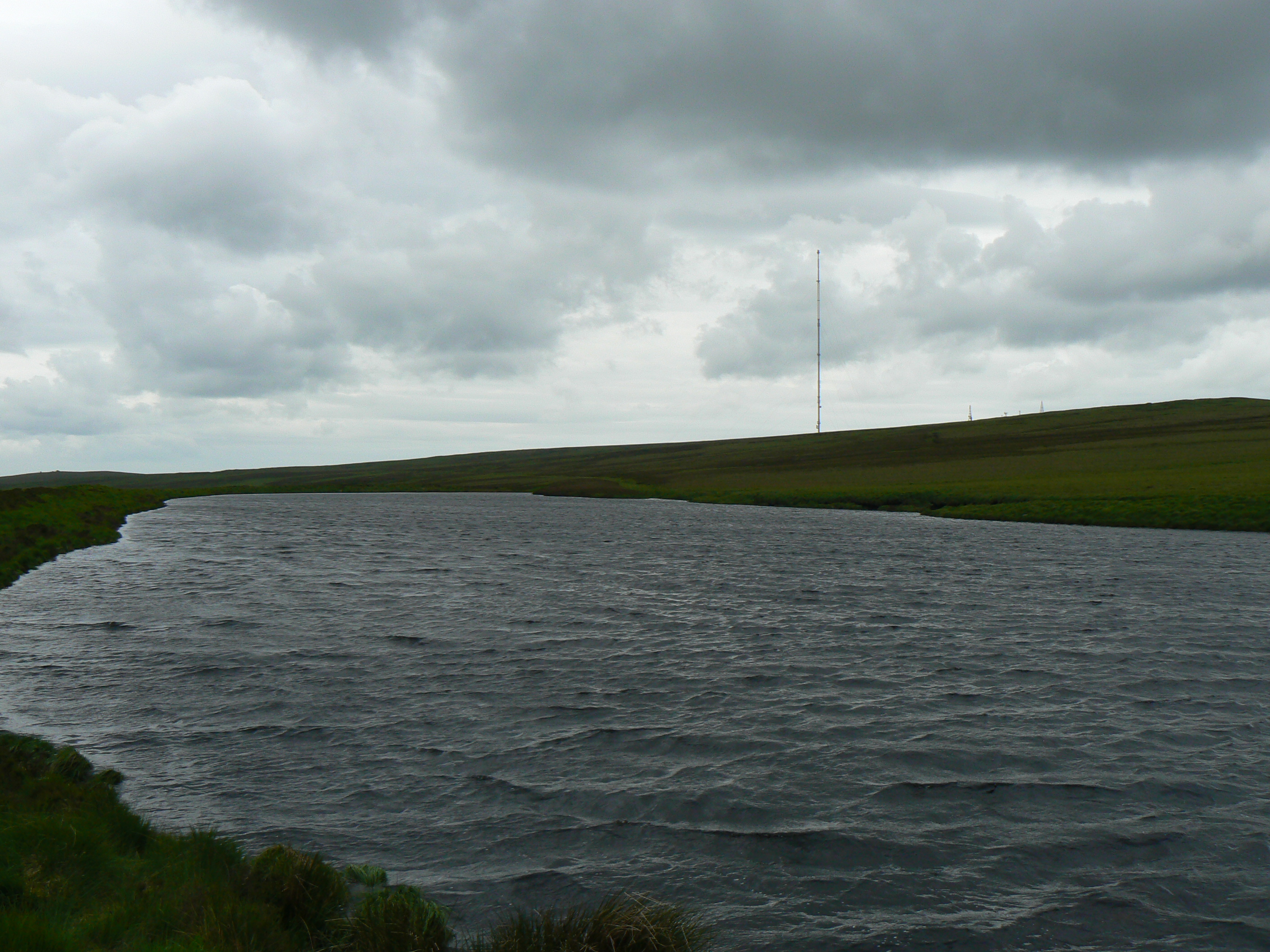
- Dean Mills Reservoir with Winter Hill TV transmitter in the distance.

- Location within Lancashire
- Location: Lancashire, England
- Coordinates: 53°37′0″N 2°29′16″W
- Built: Late 18th Century
- Surface elevation: 1,223 ft (373 m) a.s.l.

Dean Mills Reservoir is a small water reservoir to the north of the town of Bolton, Greater Manchester located high on the slopes of Winter Hill.

The reservoir was constructed above the village of Barrow Bridge by John and Robert Lord. “The Lord Brothers opened a mill there in the late 18th Century using Crompton's spinning mules. With the success of this operation they built a water-powered mill further down the valley and carried out ambitious waterworks including the construction of a reservoir, waterfall and sluices to power the mill.”

The dark brown appearance of the water in the reservoir is due to discolouration from the surrounding peat that naturally drains into the reservoir.

It was put up for sale by auction in March 2018.
