= Winterburn Reservoir =

Reservoir in North Yorkshire, England

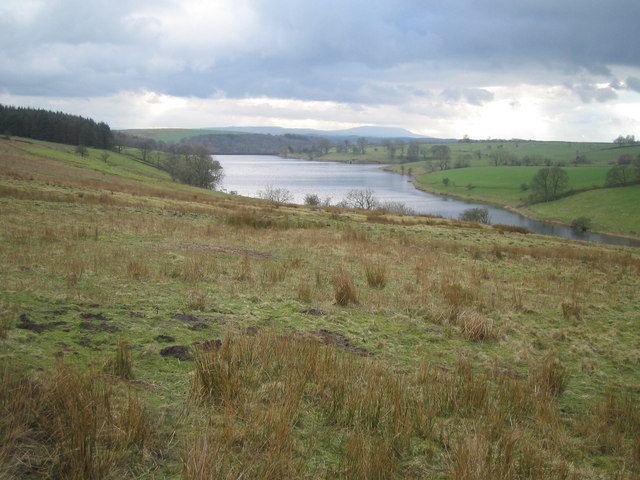
- Looking south across Winterburn Reservoir

- Location within North Yorkshire
- Location: North Yorkshire
- Coordinates: 54°2′27″N 2°5′4″W
- Type: Reservoir
- Primary inflows: Bordley Beck
- Primary outflows: Eshton Beck, Winterburn Beck
- Basin countries: United Kingdom

Winterburn Reservoir is located near the village of Winterburn in Malhamdale, North Yorkshire, England. It was constructed between 1885 and 1893 by Leeds civil engineers Henry Rofe and Edward Filliter to help maintain levels on the Leeds and Liverpool Canal. The cost of construction was estimated at £45,000. Its capacity is 281,504,000 imperial gallons (1.27974×10^{9} L; 338,072,000 US gal) and covers an area of 39.17 acres (15.85 ha)

In order to maintain the water levels of Winterburn and Eshton Beck, there is a compensation scheme. Around 1.1×10^{6} imperial gallons; 1.3×10^{6} US gallons (5×10^{6} L) of water are discharged per day. The amount of compensation water is measured in the gauge house below the reservoir and further downstream at Holme Bridge lock, Gargrave.

In order to maintain the aquatic life in the reservoir, this is monitored daily, and in times of drought the water discharged into Winterburn Beck is reduced.

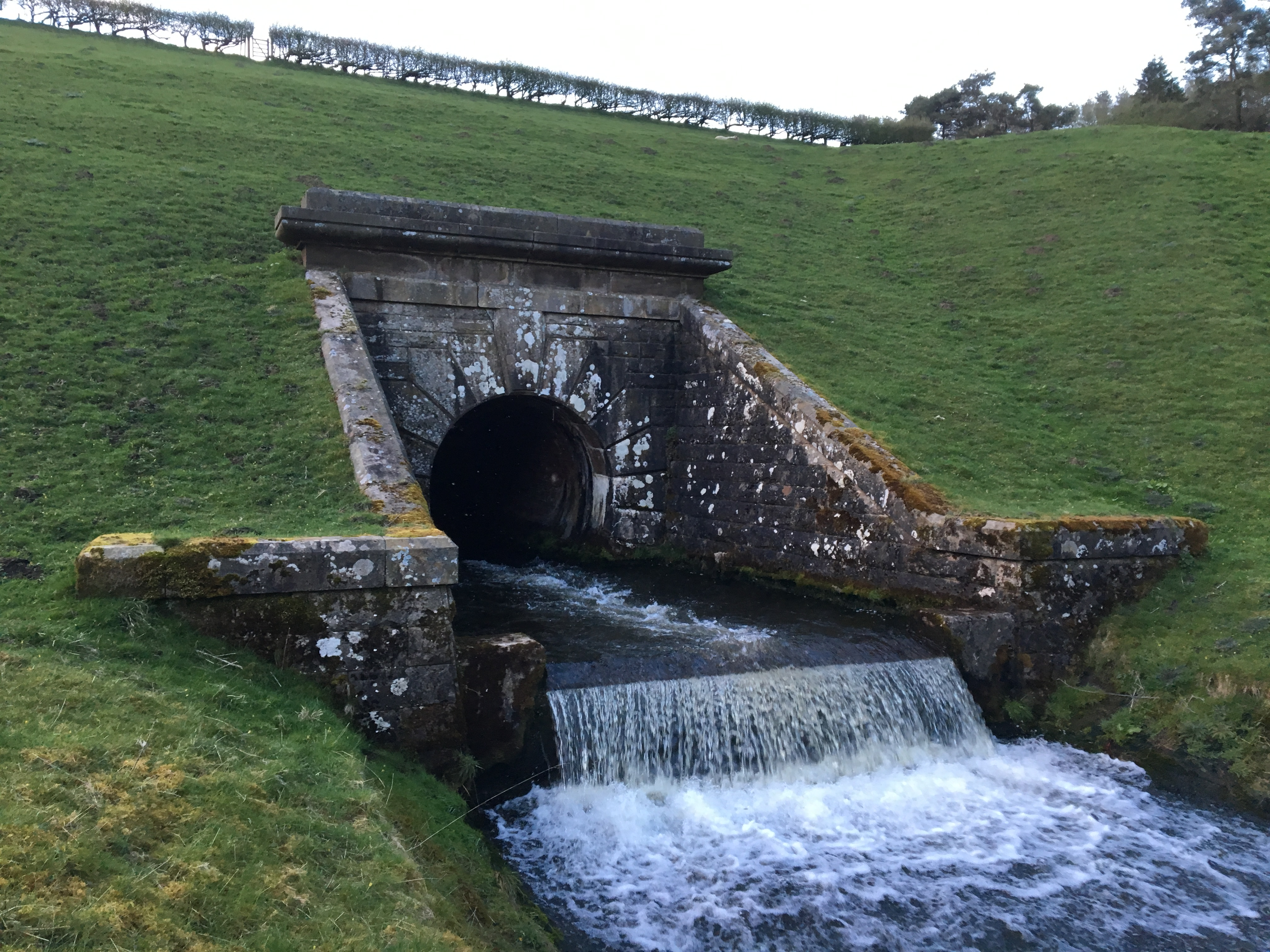
Discharge portal into Winterburn Beck

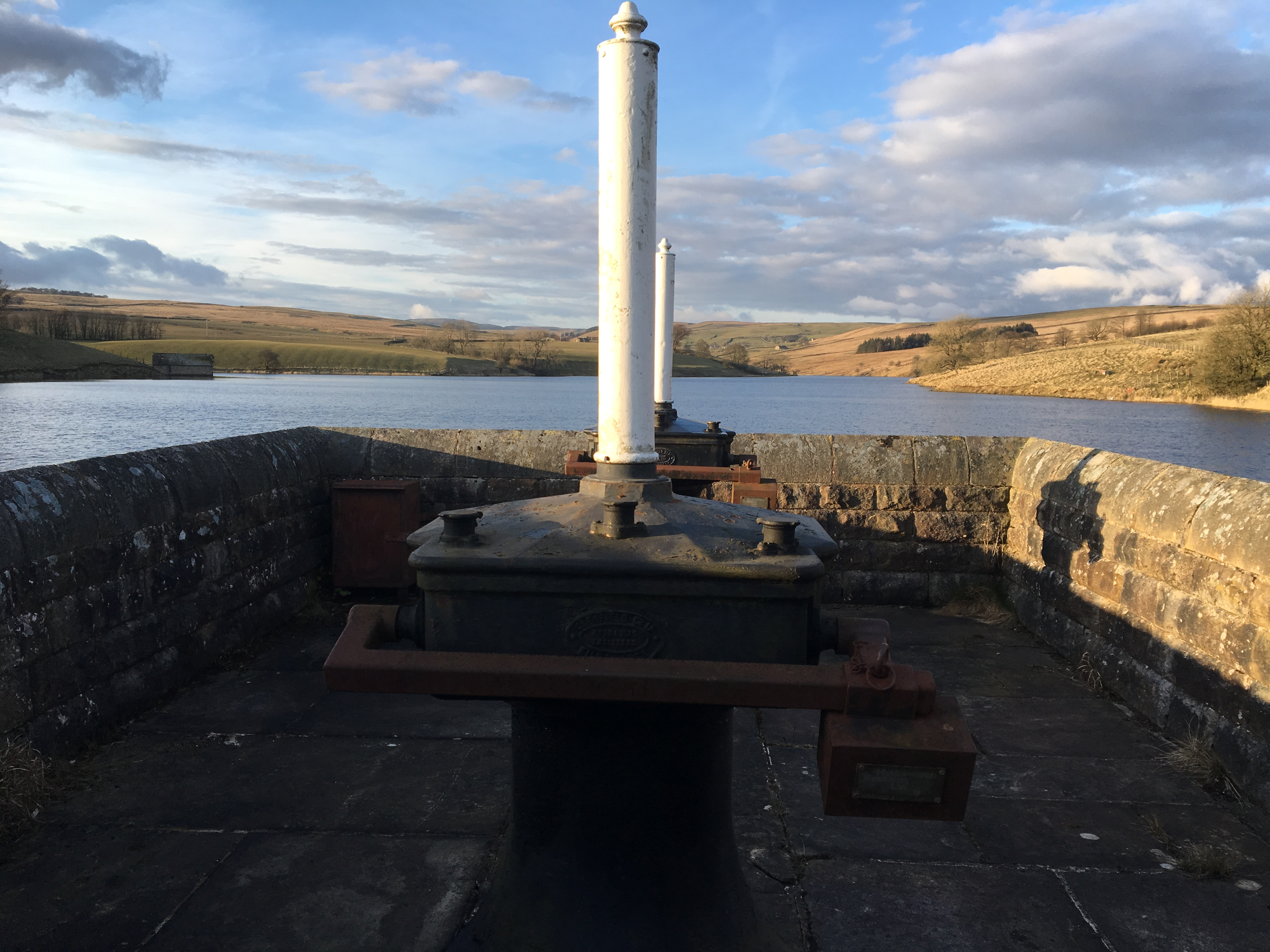
Twin cast iron valve capstans

== See also ==
- Canals of the United Kingdom
- History of the British canal system
