= Luxhay Reservoir =

Reservoir in Somerset, England

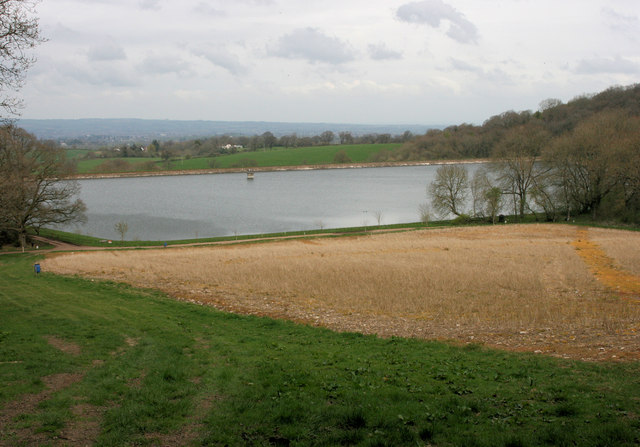

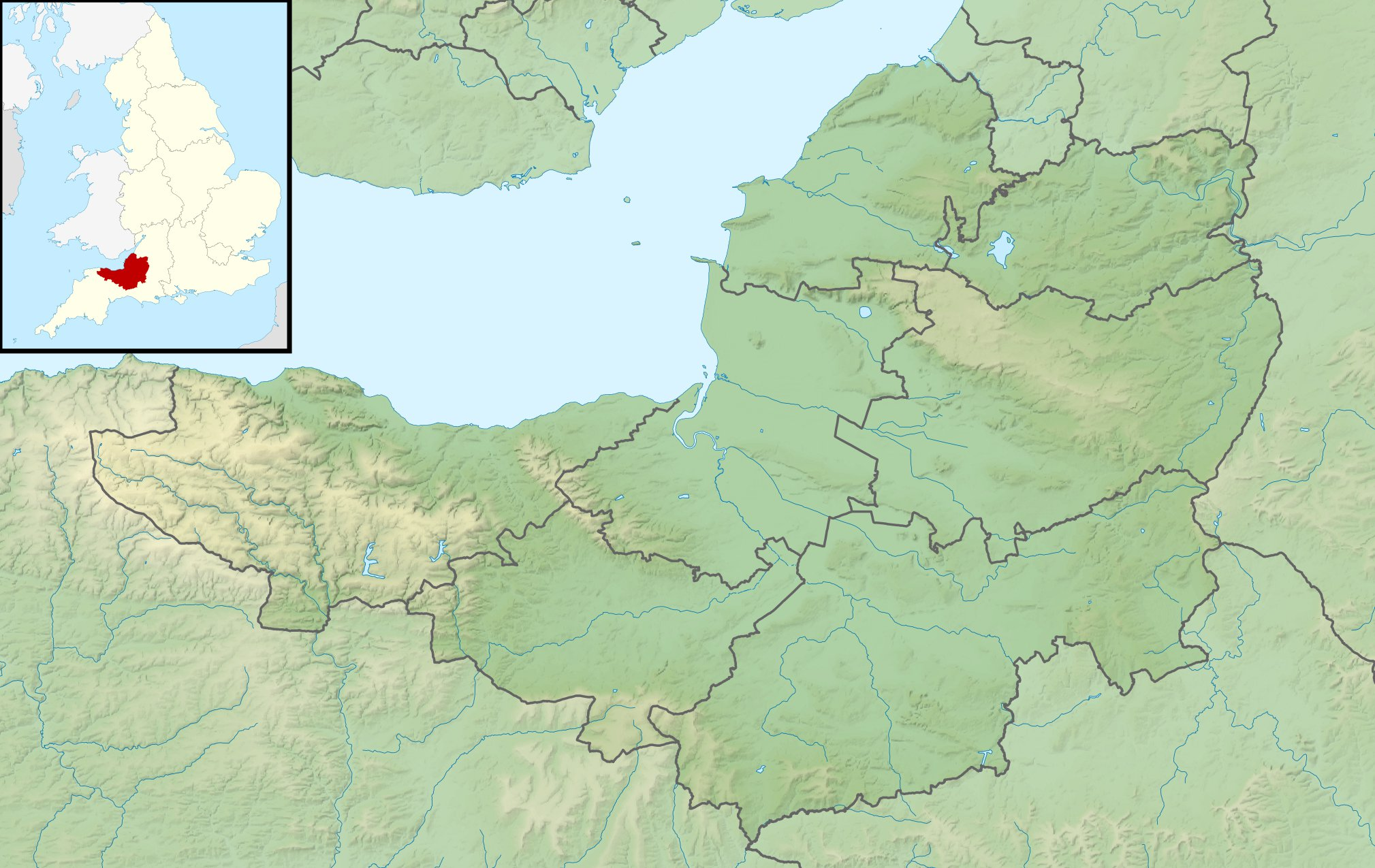
- Location within Somerset
- Location: Angersleigh, Somerset, England
- Coordinates: 50°57′10″N 3°08′15″W
- Catchment area: 30.5 square kilometres (7,500 acres)
- Built: c. 1905

Luxhay Reservoir is an artificial reservoir near Angersleigh, Somerset, England. It is now owned by Wessex Water.

It was built in 1905 by the town corporation to provide drinking water for Taunton.

The reservoir is fed by other local water sources including Otterhead Lakes and Blagdon reservoir.

From 1969 leakage was detected in the retaining dam. This got worse in 1990s remedial works, including a diaphragm wall were undertaken.

In 2006 the lake was found to have an intense bloom of Microcystins which was associated high concentrations of cyanotoxins probably associated with eutrophication of nutrient enriched sediments.
