= List of reservoirs in the United Kingdom =

The following page lists the reservoirs in the United Kingdom.

== Reservoirs accounting for 90% storage ==
This list contains 273 individual reservoirs, which amount to approximately 90% of total reservoir storage in the United Kingdom, sourced from the Environmental Information Data Centre.

Rank	Name	Country	County	Grid Ref. Location	Maximum volume m^{3}	Planning date	Completion date
26	Abberton	England	Essex	TL9810018300 51.828181°N 0.873431°E	39,000,000	1935 (Note: Parliamentary approval of scheme)	1939
175	Agden	England	South Yorkshire	SK2610092300 53.426850°N 1.6086803°W	2,859,000	1864	1869
152	Allerton Newton Fairburn	England	West Yorkshire	SE4500027200 53.739250°N 1.3192470°W	3,347,500	NA	NA
229	Allt na Lairige	Scotland	Argyll and Bute	NN2530017400 56.316700°N 4.8262144°W	1,838,000	1943 (Note: Associated with inception of North of Scotland Hydro Electric Board)	1956 (Note: Start of hydroelectric production - Hydro Electric Development (Scotland) Act 1943)
83	Alton Water	England	Suffolk	TM1620035700 51.977682°N 1.1465962°E	9,100,000	1974 (Note: Associated with act that gave an authority powers)	1986
60	Alwen Reservoir	Wales	Conwy	SH9550053000 53.063990°N 3.5609018°W	14,754,000	1909	1921
135	Anglezarke	England	Lancashire	SD6170016000 53.639105°N 2.5807524°W	4,044,000	1850	1857
129	Angram	England	North Yorkshire	SE0400076000 54.179767°N 1.9402122°W	4,737,000	1904	1918
119	Ardingly	England	West Sussex	TQ3350028800 51.043051°N 0.097062417°W	5,206,000	1974 (Note: The Environmental Information Data Centre source used states the sources they used could be dubious for parts (or this part) of this entry)	1979
210	Ardleigh	England	Essex	TM0340028200 51.915170°N 0.95606328°E	2,109,000	1964	1979
143	Arlington	England	East Sussex	TQ5335207419 50.845975°N 0.17691709°E	3,545,800	1969	1971
185	Audenshaw No.1	England	Greater Manchester	SJ9170096700 53.466973°N 2.1264940°W	2,590,000	1875	1882
234	Audenshaw No.2	England	Greater Manchester	SJ9140096200 53.462474°N 2.1309991°W	1,745,000	1875	1882
183	Audenshaw No.3	England	Greater Manchester	SJ9110096700 53.466963°N 2.1355320°W	2,680,000	1877	1882
	Backwater	Scotland	Angus	NO253591 56.715°N 3.220°W	24,550,000	1964	1969
201	Baddinsgill	Scotland	Scottish Borders	NT1286455787 55.787507°N 3.3910944°W	2,250,000	1926	1828
144	Baitings	England	West Yorkshire	SE0100018900 53.666580°N 1.9863413°W	3,523,000	1929	1956
168	Bakethin	England	Northumberland	NY6430091300 55.214639°N 2.5626151°W	2,960,000	1971 (Note: First mention of scheme on Hansard)	1981
50	Balderhead	England	County Durham	NY9280018400 54.560782°N 2.1128527°W	19,618,000	1959	1965
178	Banbury	England	Greater London	TQ3620091400 51.604974°N 0.034668699°W	2,779,000	1897	1903
166	Banbury FSA	England	Greater London	TQ3620091400 51.604974°N 0.034668699°W	3,040,000	2001	2012
202	Barden Lower	England	North Yorkshire	SE0350056700 54.006312°N 1.9480887°W	2,240,000	1854	1873
209	Barden Upper	England	North Yorkshire	SE0120057800 54.016208°N 1.9831770°W	2,112,000	1854	1873
261	Barnacre North	England	Lancashire	SD5260047800 53.924153°N 2.7232767°W	344,000	1861	1878
264	Barnacre South	England	Lancashire	SD5260047600 53.922355°N 2.7232456°W	248,000	1861	1878
268	Barrow 1	England	Somerset	ST5360067200 51.401921°N 2.6684067°W	157,000	1846	1850
265	Barrow 2	England	Somerset	ST5390067500 51.404643°N 2.6641335°W	245,000	1846	1850
208	Barrow 3	England	Somerset	ST5430068000 51.409171°N 2.6584480°W	2,160,000	1846	1850
191	Bartley	England	West Midlands County	SP0020081200 52.428782°N 1.9984853°W	2,400,000	1925	1930
267	Beacons Reservoir	Wales	Powys	SN9870018580 51.856583°N 3.4722935°W	160,000	1883	1897
96	Beckingham FSA	England	Nottinghamshire	SK7950090500 53.405341°N 0.80563022°W	7,000,000	1960	1960
224	Belmont	England	Blackburn with Darwen	SD6730016400 53.643081°N 2.4960998°W	1,886,000	1824	1826
206	Belvide	England	Staffordshire	SJ8650010200 52.689316°N 2.2011613°W	2,196,000	1825	1833
239	Ben Crom	Northern Ireland	County Down	SB4015582002 54.167845°N 5.9825162°W	1,700,000	1945	1957
32	Bewl Bridge	England	East Sussex	TQ6776832663 51.068782°N 0.39313386°E	31,400,000	1967	1975
195	Blackbrook	England	Leicestershire	SK4580017500 52.753180°N 1.3228607°W	2,300,000	1901	1906
160	Blackmoorfoot	England	West Yorkshire	SE0990013000 53.613459°N 1.8518301°W	3,205,000	1869	1876
212	Blackton	England	County Durham	NY9440018600 54.562600°N 2.0881146°W	2,105,000	1876	1896
5	Blackwater	Scotland	Highland	NN2475160292 56.701359°N 4.8639740°W	214,977,000	1904	1909
88	Blagdon (Bristol)	England	Somerset	ST5100060000 51.336967°N 2.7047849°W	8,260,000	1888	1904
52	Blithfield	England	Staffordshire	SK0600023500 52.809016°N 1.9124313°W	18,200,000	1892	1953
248	Bosley	England	Cheshire	SJ9220065900 53.190130°N 2.1181929°W	1,224,000	1826	1931
196	Bottoms (Longdendale)	England	Derbyshire	SK0230097000 53.469732°N 1.9668196°W	2,300,000	1848	1877
78	Bough Beech	England	Kent	TQ4940047700 51.208972°N 0.13741063°E	10,018,000	1965	1968
220	Branston Island	England	Lincolnshire	TF1000071000 53.224667°N 0.35378615°W	2,000,000	NA	1960
246	Brent	England	Greater London	TQ2160087100 51.569668°N 0.24686808°W	1,632,330	1819	1835
126	Broomhead	England	South Yorkshire	SK2690095900 53.459168°N 1.5963348°W	4,937,282	1867	1929
69	Brotherton Little Marsh to Birkin Holme Washland	England	North Yorkshire	SE5210025300 53.721515°N 1.2119357°W	11,320,000	NA	NA
102	Burnhope	England	County Durham	NY8470039000 54.745724°N 2.2391942°W	6,438,182	1931	1937
132	Burrator	England	Devon	SX5568768562 50.499032°N 4.0361770°W	4,464,000	1891	1898
232	Butterley	England	Derbyshire	SE0470010500 53.591059°N 1.9304674°W	1,773,000	1789	1794
28	Caban Coch	Wales	Powys	SN9160063200 52.256256°N 3.5895197°W	36,865,000	1892	1904
218	Caldecott Lake	England	Buckinghamshire	SP8990035800 52.013356°N 0.69150143°W	2,014,000	1967	1972
269	Cantref Reservoir	Wales	Powys	SN9938015840 51.832079°N 3.4616252°W	145,000	1884	1892
29	Carsington	England	Derbyshire	SK2480051400 53.059279°N 1.6314139°W	36,000,000	1973	1992
75	Catcleugh	England	Northumberland	NT7470003100 55.321313°N 2.4002361°W	10,500,000	1888	1905
240	Catterall Flood Storage	England	Lancashire	SD4680041300 53.865173°N 2.8104563°W	1,700,000	NA	1982
214	Cavendish Dock	England	Cumbria	SD2120068300 54.104527°N 3.2066514°W	2,053,000	1863	1879
63	Cawood Ings Wistow Lordship	England	North Yorkshire	SE6050036000 53.816769°N 1.0825621°W	13,500,000	NA	NA
142	Chasewater	England	Staffordshire	SK0360007600 52.666103°N 1.9482042°W	3,691,000	1794	1797
108	Cheddar	England	Somerset	ST4410053700 51.279686°N 2.8028357°W	6,140,000	1933	1938
270	Chelker	England	North Yorkshire	SE0564051600 53.960456°N 1.9155302°W	95,000	NA	1866
164	Chelmarsh	England	Shropshire	SO7340087500 52.484765°N 2.3931329°W	3,063,320	1960	1963
273	Chew Magna	England	Somerset	ST5660063200 51.366195°N 2.6247933°W	43,000	1850	1850
47	Chew Valley Lake	England	Somerset	ST5700060000 51.337453°N 2.6186602°W	20,457,000	1939	1956
111	Chrathaich	Scotland	Highland	NH3640020700 57.247645°N 4.7131125°W	5,629,000	1928	1955
177	Church Wilne	England	Derbyshire	SK4630032500 52.887970°N 1.3133319°W	2,790,000	NA	1972
22	Claerwen	Wales	Powys	SN8550065100 52.272093°N 3.6794917°W	48,686,000	1892	1952
116	Clatworthy	England	Somerset	ST0430031400 51.073920°N 3.3673742°W	5,364,000	1950	1958
197	Clifton Ings Washlands	England	North Yorkshire	SE5870053100 53.970648°N 1.1066274°W	2,300,000	NA	NA
34	Colliford Lake	England	Cornwall	SX1790071000 50.510401°N 4.5696538°W	29,100,000	1976	1983
127	Colt Crag	England	Northumberland	NY9400078100 55.097285°N 2.0955583°W	4,855,000	1863	1884
73	Covenham	England	Lincolnshire	TF3463596017 53.443731°N 0.025611218°E	10,900,000	1963	1978
24	Cow Green	England	Durham	NY8120028900 54.654841°N 2.2929079°W	40,914,000	1958	1970
79	Craig Goch	Wales	Powys	SN8960069800 52.315169°N 3.6209719°W	9,583,000	1892	1904
136	Cray	Wales	Powys	SN8850022000 51.885373°N 3.6214431°W	4,027,000	1898	1906
186	Cropston	England	Leicestershire	SK5470011000 52.693928°N 1.1920904°W	2,528,000	1865	1870
48	Crowlands Cowbit Washes	England	Lincolnshire	TF2600016500 52.731468°N 0.13545822°W	20,000,000	NA	NA
147	Crummock Water	England	Cumbria	NY1510020800 54.575257°N 3.3148907°W	3,400,000	NA	NA
70	Curry Moor Flood Storage Area	England	Somerset	ST3260027000 51.038387°N 2.9626802°W	11,283,000	NA	NA
44	Daer	Scotland	South Lanarkshire	NS9757507812 55.353611°N 3.6169925°W	22,494,000	1948	1956
205	Dale Dyke	England	South Yorkshire	SK2430091700 53.421543°N 1.6358144°W	2,210,000	1853	1875
118	Damflask	England	South Yorkshire	SK2840090700 53.412351°N 1.5742116°W	5,264,000	1864	1867
130	Darwell	England	East Sussex	TQ7150021200 50.964696°N 0.44093306°E	4,730,000	1937	1949
194	Delph	England	Greater Manchester	SD7030015400 53.634273°N 2.4506272°W	2,326,700	1905	1921
80	Derwent	England	Derbyshire	SK1730089800 53.404740°N 1.7412482°W	9,470,000	1899	1916
19	Derwent Reservoir	England	County Durham	NZ0250051400 54.857386°N 1.9625840°W	50,060,000	1950	1966
157	Digley	England	West Yorkshire	SE1100007000 53.559507°N 1.8354124°W	3,260,000	1937	1954
258	Doe Park	England	West Yorkshire	SE0780034200 53.804041°N 1.8830465°W	422,000	1857	1862
266	Donolly Reservoir	Scotland	East Lothian	NT5780068700 55.909541°N 2.6766156°W	209,000	NA	NA
123	Dovestone	England	Greater Manchester	SE0160003600 53.529058°N 1.9773335°W	5,048,000	1958	1966
43	Draycote Water	England	Warwickshire	SP4600070000 52.326175°N 1.3264618°W	22,730,000	1965	1969
42	East Ings and Wood Holmes Washland Reservoir	England	North Yorkshire	SE5230024300 53.712507°N 1.2090737°W	23,700,000	NA	NA
251	East Warwick	England	Greater London	TQ3480088500 51.579250°N 0.055985047°W	742,000	1853	1900
103	Eccup	England	West Yorkshire	SE3080041800 53.871498°N 1.5330645°W	6,410,000	1885	1897
153	Eglwys Nunydd	Wales	Neath Port Talbot	SS7920085500 51.555411°N 3.7438321°W	3,311,000	1957	1963
148	Ennerdale Water	England	Cumbria	NY0890015300 54.524765°N 3.4090669°W	3,400,000	1902	1902
145	Entwistle	England	Blackburn with Darwen	SD7200017500 53.653241°N 2.4251088°W	3,464,000	1832	1838
134	Errwood	England	Derbyshire	SK0140075200 53.273783°N 1.9804662°W	4,216,000	1930	1967
90	Eyebrook	England	Leicestershire	SP8480094700 52.543560°N 0.75099918°W	8,096,000	1937	1940
187	Farmoor No. 1	England	Oxfordshire	SP4450006800 51.758126°N 1.3566759°W	2,505,000	1962	1967
122	Farmoor No. 2	England	Oxfordshire	SP4450006000 51.750934°N 1.3567780°W	5,055,000	1962	1977
125	Fernilee	England	Derbyshire	SK0130077700 53.296255°N 1.9819564°W	4,944,000	1930	1938
237	Fernworthy	England	Devon	SX6710084300 50.643190°N 3.8809759°W	1,727,300	1934	1942
141	Fewston	England	North Yorkshire	SE1870054100 53.982621°N 1.7163354°W	3,845,000	1874	1879
231	Ffynnon Llugwy	Wales	Conwy	SH6920062400 53.142643°N 3.9569822°W	1,776,000	1915	1926
174	Fiddler's Ferry P.S. Ash Lagoon D	England	Cheshire	SJ5520085500 53.364460°N 2.6746880°W	2,900,000	NA	NA
154	Fontburn	England	Northumberland	NZ0450093500 55.235687°N 1.9307831°W	3,279,000	1898	1903
64	Foremark	England	Derbyshire	SK3290024400 52.816142°N 1.5132885°W	13,193,490	1966	1977
76	Fruid	Scotland	Scottish Borders	NT0968919217 55.458437°N 3.4296968°W	10,438,000	1953	1968
82	Garreg Ddu	Wales	Powys	SN9110063900 52.262447°N 3.5970679°W	9,222,000	1892	1904
89	Gladhouse	Scotland	Midlothian	NT2977853599 55.770608°N 3.1208736°W	8,133,000	NA	1879
84	Glen Finglas	Scotland	Stirling	NN5241009260 56.252852°N 4.3838037°W	9,043,000	1911	1965
243	Glencorse	Scotland	Midlothian	NT2164763897 55.861862°N 3.2534157°W	1,673,000	1819	1824
236	Gorple Upper	England	West Yorkshire	SD9240031400 53.778874°N 2.1168095°W	1,731,000	1928	1934
110	Gouthwaite	England	North Yorkshire	SE1300069000 54.116708°N 1.8026204°W	5,810,789	1893	1901
17	Grafham Water	England	Cambridgeshire	TL1700067000 52.288689°N 0.28606805°W	55,490,000	1961	1965
109	Grassholme	England	County Durham	NY9380022400 54.596742°N 2.0974750°W	6,060,000	1876	1915
146	Greenbooth	England	Greater Manchester	SD8530015200 53.633114°N 2.2237757°W	3,405,000	1958	1962
45	Grimwith	England	North Yorkshire	SE0600064200 54.073696°N 1.9097996°W	22,200,000	1856	1864
163	Hallington East	England	Northumberland	NY9730076300 55.081140°N 2.0438290°W	3,116,740	1863	1872
149	Hallington West	England	Northumberland	NY9650076000 55.078439°N 2.0563562°W	3,380,000	1876	1890
272	Hampton - Sunnyside	England	Greater London	TQ1270069000 51.408835°N 0.38099829°W	71,000	1852	1855
36	Hanningfield	England	Essex	TQ7330098400 51.657668°N 0.50402549°E	27,721,000	1949	1957
13	Haweswater	England	Cumbria	NY5000015500 54.532294°N 2.7741697°W	84,840,000	1880	1935
176	Heaton Park	England	Greater Manchester	SD8250004700 53.538652°N 2.2655256°W	2,800,000	1954	1955
263	Hewenden	England	West Yorkshire	SE0740035600 53.816630°N 1.8890870°W	252,000	1842	1846
254	High Maynard	England	Greater London	TQ3550089600 51.588967°N 0.045464928°W	659,000	1867	1870
181	Hilfield Park	England	Hertfordshire	TQ1570096000 51.650897°N 0.32902291°W	2,728,000	NA	1955
189	Hollingworth Lake	England	Greater Manchester	SD9350015300 53.634181°N 2.0997734°W	2,468,000	1794	1800
213	Hollowell	England	Northamptonshire	SP6900072400 52.345343°N 0.98853688°W	2,064,000	1936	1939
256	Hopes	Scotland	East Lothian	NT5470062100 55.849963°N 2.7250932°W	600,000	NA	1933
85	Howden	England	Derbyshire	SK1700092500 53.429018°N 1.7456160°W	8,990,000	1899	1916
139	Hury	England	County Durham	NY9650019600 54.571606°N 2.0556516°W	3,905,000	1876	1894
137	Island Barn	England	Surrey	TQ1390067000 51.390619°N 0.36439363°W	4,011,000	1900	1911
215	Jumbles	England	Greater Manchester	SD7350013900 53.620963°N 2.4021067°W	2,050,000	1971	1971
61	Kellington Ings Reservoir	England	North Yorkshire	SE5910024500 53.713581°N 1.1060210°W	14,400,000	NA	NA
6	Kielder	England	Northumberland	NY7080087500 55.180922°N 2.4600692°W	199,000,000	1971	1981
159	Killington	England	Cumbria	SD5900091000 54.312936°N 2.6317055°W	3,238,210	1817	1819
217	Kinder	England	Derbyshire	SK0585088190 53.390517°N 1.9135015°W	2,028,000	1899	1912
72	King George V	England	Greater London	TQ3740096500 51.650510°N 0.015352701°W	10,981,000	1893	1912
51	King George VI	England	Surrey	TQ0410073200 51.448229°N 0.50336831°W	18,732,000	1936	1947
35	Ladybower	England	Derbyshire	SK2000085500 53.365994°N 1.7009077°W	27,800,000	1920	1943
222	Lamaload	England	Cheshire	SJ9710075300 53.274675°N 2.0449474°W	1,932,000	1958	1963
104	Langsett	England	South Yorkshire	SE2140000200 53.498069°N 1.6788755°W	6,401,000	1897	1904
259	Leeming	England	West Yorkshire	SE0380034400 53.805882°N 1.9437800°W	408,000	1872	1878
113	Leigh Barrier (Medway) FSR	England	Kent	TQ5650046300 51.194493°N 0.23836213°E	5,580,000	1976	1982
128	Leighton	England	North Yorkshire	SE1620078800 54.204694°N 1.7531441°W	4,780,000	1908	1926
165	Lindley Wood	England	North Yorkshire	SE2150049300 53.939372°N 1.6739758°W	3,045,000	1870	1874
167	Linton Ings	England	North Yorkshire	SE4840060400 54.037317°N 1.2624729°W	3,000,000	NA	NA
238	Little Swinburne	England	Northumberland	NY9450077200 55.089204°N 2.0877054°W	1,721,000	1863	1879
41	Llandegfedd	Wales	Monmouthshire / Torfaen	ST3260098500 51.681200°N 2.9762550°W	24,492,000	1957	1964
121	Llwyn-On	Wales	Rhondda Cynon Taf	SO0110011400 51.792479°N 3.4354039°W	5,066,000	1884	1926
95	Llyn Alaw	Wales	Gwynedd	SH3740085400 53.340440°N 4.4437297°W	7,400,000	1961	1965
230	Llyn Aled	Wales	Conwy	SH9160057900 53.107241°N 3.6207301°W	1,777,000	NA	1934
93	Llyn Arenig Fawr	Wales	Gwynedd	SH8500037900 52.926156°N 3.7121426°W	7,488,000	NA	1830
18	Llyn Brenig	Wales	Conwy / Denbighshire	SH9770054300 53.076098°N 3.5284979°W	54,273,000	1973	1979
30	Llyn Brianne	Wales	Powys	SN7910048500 52.121552°N 3.7673117°W	32,882,000	1967	1972
23	Llyn Celyn	Wales	Gwynedd	SH8592140424 52.949031°N 3.6993374°W	40,959,000	1957	1965
21	Clywedog Reservoir (Llyn Clywedog)	Wales	Powys	SN8980088500 52.483257°N 3.6242003°W	48,828,000	1963	1967
81	Llyn Cowlyd	Wales	Conwy	SH7380063400 53.152737°N 3.8886457°W	9,432,000	1891	1897
241	Llyn Cwellyn	Wales	Gwynedd	SH5540055600 53.077993°N 4.1600815°W	1,687,000	NA	1976
173	Llyn Cwmystradllyn	Wales	Gwynedd	SH5620044300 52.976703°N 4.1431080°W	2,902,000	1959	1959
226	Llyn Peris	Wales	Gwynedd	SH5870059900 53.117503°N 4.1127477°W	1,870,000	1973	1979
250	Llyn Stwlan	Wales	Gwynedd	SH6660044400 52.980292°N 3.9883645°W	747,000	1952	1963
11	Llyn Tegid (Bala Lake)	Wales	Gwynedd	SH9290035000 52.901732°N 3.5937195°W	106,751,000	1803	1804
40	Llyn Trawsfynydd	Wales	Gwynedd	SH6940038200 52.925281°N 3.9441860°W	26,108,000	1924	1928
140	Loch Achonachie	Scotland	Highland	NH4460054600 57.554706°N 4.5988314°W	3,873,000	1943	1954
37	Loch an Diamh	Scotland	Perth and Kinross	NN5086746354 56.585328°N 4.4298309°W	27,052,000	1953	1959
57	Loch Arklet	Scotland	Stirling	NN3778009120 56.246825°N 4.6195911°W	16,286,000	1902	1914
54	Loch Bradan	Scotland	South Ayrshire	NX4205297297 55.244500°N 4.4860239°W	17,475,000	1908	1912
105	Loch Drunkie	Scotland	Stirling	NN5425004390 56.209704°N 4.3514522°W	6,346,000	1854	1864
4	Loch Earn	Scotland	Perth and Kinross	NN6990024200 56.392099°N 4.1091174°W	397,630,000	1943	1958
190	Loch Eigheach Gaur	Scotland	Perth and Kinross	NN4610056900 56.678440°N 4.5136547°W	2,461,000	1943	1953
1	Loch Ericht	Scotland	Perth and Kinross	NN5080062700 56.732022°N 4.4403880°W	1,291,596,000	1912	1962
8	Loch Garry	Scotland	Highland	NH2760002100 57.077537°N 4.8459025°W	163,272,000	1943	1956
249	Loch Gleann A'Bhearraidh	Scotland	Argyll and Bute	NM8446426911 56.385184°N 5.4930136°W	774,000	1939	1939
2	Loch Katrine	Scotland	Stirling	NN4433509530 56.252698°N 4.5141613°W	804,704,000	1848	1859
49	Loch Loyne	Scotland	Highland	NH2010007900 57.126700°N 4.9736204°W	19,859,000	1938	1957
9	Loch Luichart	Scotland	Highland	NH3650061500 57.613757°N 4.7386845°W	128,124,000	1943	1954
16	Loch Lyon	Scotland	Perth and Kinross	NN4520041700 56.541721°N 4.5192239°W	59,270,000	1951	1958
58	Loch Nant	Scotland	Argyll and Bute	NN0030024900 56.374101°N 5.2354396°W	15,464,000	1959	1963
3	Loch Quoich	Scotland	Highland	NH0710002300 57.071201°N 5.1837051°W	556,677,000	1928	1955
260	Loch Spey	Scotland	Highland	NN5810093700 57.012555°N 4.3384944°W	356,000	1918	1938
86	Loch Thom	Scotland	Renfrewshire	NS2594872193 55.911261°N 4.7862577°W	8,668,000	1824	1827
65	Loch Vaich	Scotland	Highland	NH3460074900 57.733285°N 4.7796402°W	12,388,000	1943	1957
20	Loch Venachar	Scotland	Stirling	NN5743905550 56.221084°N 4.3007086°W	49,358,000	1854	1857
211	Lockwood	England	Greater London	TQ3530090200 51.594407°N 0.048118991°W	2,106,000	1893	1903
257	Loganlea	Scotland	Midlothian	NT1944262397 55.848025°N 3.2881891°W	532,000	1847	1851
271	Low Maynard	England	Greater London	TQ3550089600 51.588967°N 0.045464928°W	80,000	1867	1870
124	Marchlyn Mawr	Wales	Gwynedd	SH6170062200 53.138951°N 4.0689468°W	5,017,000	1973	1979
14	Megget	Scotland	Scottish Borders	NT1925822198 55.486890°N 3.2792883°W	63,722,000	1963	1983
162	Meldon	England	Devon	SX5630091600 50.706230°N 4.0364604°W	3,170,000	1962	1972
245	Mickletown Washland	England	West Yorkshire	SE4150027100 53.738640°N 1.3723192°W	1,655,000	NA	NA
227	Midhope	England	South Yorkshire	SK2230099400 53.490841°N 1.6653653°W	1,859,000	1895	1903
244	Misson East FSA	England	Nottinghamshire	SK7090094900 53.446107°N 0.93397635°W	1,670,000	NA	NA
233	Misson West FSA	England	Nottinghamshire	SK6850094000 53.438336°N 0.97030047°W	1,750,000	NA	NA
207	More Hall	England	South Yorkshire	SK2870095800 53.458175°N 1.5692355°W	2,172,989	1867	1929
7	Loch Mullardoch	Scotland	Highland	NH2220031300 57.337439°N 4.9557405°W	165,226,000	1943	1951
39	Nant-y-Moch	Wales	Ceredigion	SN7540086200 52.459490°N 3.8352785°W	26,292,000	1955	1964
193	Northampton Washlands	England	West Northamptonshire	SP7950060200 52.234265°N 0.83730834°W	2,340,000	NA	NA
107	Ogston	England	Derbyshire	SK3780059900 53.134923°N 1.4364542°W	6,180,000	1953	1958
198	Oldbury Power Station	England	Gloucestershire	ST6000095000 51.652358°N 2.5795759°W	2,300,000	NA	NA
12	Ouse Washes	England	Cambridgeshire	TL5000089000 52.478317°N 0.20724239°E	90,000,000	NA	1652
114	Penygarreg	Wales	Powys	SN9030067400 52.293742°N 3.6099246°W	5,558,000	1892	1904
53	Pitsford	England	Northamptonshire	SP7550068900 52.313028°N 0.89392331°W	17,545,000	1946	1955
74	Pontsticill (Taf Fechan)	Wales	Merthyr Tydfil / Powys	SO0610011800 51.796937°N 3.3630375°W	10,717,000	1921	1927
55	Queen Elizabeth II	England	Surrey	TQ1180067100 51.391935°N 0.39453096°W	16,809,000	1935	1967
33	Queen Mary	England	Surrey	TQ0730069700 51.416173°N 0.45839646°W	30,363,000	1911	1925
31	Queen Mother	England	Berkshire	TQ0090076800 51.481166°N 0.54837454°W	31,492,000	1945	1976
225	Ravensthorpe	England	West Northamptonshire	SP6810070400 52.327477°N 1.0021509°W	1,884,000	1880	1890
200	Rhodeswood	England	Derbyshire	SK0440098200 53.480505°N 1.9351681°W	2,273,000	1848	1855
262	River Shin	Scotland	Highland	NC5820005100 58.012378°N 4.4016958°W	316,000	1954	1958
161	River Till Controlled Washland	England	Nottinghamshire	SK7030077500 53.289812°N 0.94687140°W	3,200,000	1977	1990
106	River Witham Flood Washlands	England	Lincolnshire	SK9520063800 53.162822°N 0.57753531°W	6,300,000	NA	NA
100	Rivington Lower	England	Lancashire	SD6300012400 53.606843°N 2.5606621°W	6,516,000	1850	1857
27	Roadford	England	Devon	SX4200090000 50.688140°N 4.2381365°W	36,910,000	1976	1989
188	Roundhill	England	North Yorkshire	SE1500077200 54.190351°N 1.7716197°W	2,503,000	NA	1910
170	Rudyard	England	Staffordshire	SJ9450059600 53.133529°N 2.0836602°W	2,949,700	NA	1796
10	Rutland Water	England	Rutland	SK9440008000 52.661511°N 0.60569370°W	124,000,000	1968	1976
242	Scaling	England	North Yorkshire	NZ7490012800 54.504993°N 0.84482832°W	1,682,000	1946	1958
91	Scammonden	England	West Yorkshire	SE0530016700 53.646781°N 1.9212997°W	7,873,000	1965	1969
77	Scar House	England	North Yorkshire	SE0580076900 54.187839°N 1.9126169°W	10,069,000	1921	1936
171	Seathwaite Tarn	England	Cumbria	SD2500098600 54.377355°N 3.1561370°W	2,945,000	1900	1907
59	Selset	England	County Durham	NY9180021100 54.585031°N 2.1283928°W	15,320,000	1955	1960
223	Shustoke Lower	England	Warwickshire	SP2280091200 52.518210°N 1.6654290°W	1,921,000	1870	1884
150	Siblyback	England	Cornwall	SX2320070300 50.505737°N 4.4946487°W	3,364,000	1965	1969
62	Silent Valley	Northern Ireland	County Down	SB3865978967 54.139876°N 6.0027439°W	13,638,270	1910	1933
97	Staines North	England	Surrey	TQ0500073600 51.451658°N 0.49030334°W	6,940,000	1898	1902
94	Staines South	England	Surrey	TQ0500072500 51.441771°N 0.49062937°W	7,469,000	1898	1902
99	Staunton Harold	England	Derbyshire	SK3767923473 52.807498°N 1.4424902°W	6,655,000	1958	1964
115	Stithians	England	Cornwall	SW7190036400 50.183607°N 5.1965073°W	5,420,000	1955	1967
68	Stocks	England	Lancashire	SD7200054600 53.986684°N 2.4284992°W	11,800,000	1910	1932
203	Strines	England	South Yorkshire	SK2320090500 53.410806°N 1.6524541°W	2,239,000	1853	1869
184	Sutton Bingham	England	Somerset	ST5540011400 50.900343°N 2.6356000°W	2,600,000	1952	1955
138	Swinsty	England	North Yorkshire	SE1960053400 53.976296°N 1.7026564°W	3,936,000	1871	1877
204	Swithland	England	Leicestershire	SK5570014800 52.727983°N 1.1766534°W	2,227,540	1890	1896
180	"Tadcaster, Hackenby, North Ings and Cock Beck"	England	North Yorkshire	SE4950042000 53.871853°N 1.2486563°W	2,748,750	NA	NA
66	Talla	Scotland	Scottish Borders	NT1171721532 55.479603°N 3.3983738°W	12,020,000	1897	1905
67	Talybont	Wales	Powys	SO1060020500 51.875877°N 3.3000529°W	11,921,000	1930	1939
221	Tanygrisiau	Wales	Gwynedd	SH6830044700 52.983408°N 3.9631826°W	1,970,000	1952	1963
25	Thirlmere	England	Cumbria	NY3100019000 54.561506°N 3.0685524°W	40,714,000	1879	1894
92	Thruscross	England	North Yorkshire	SE1520057800 54.015989°N 1.7695224°W	7,800,000	1955	1966
101	Tittesworth	England	Staffordshire	SJ9930058700 53.125468°N 2.0119145°W	6,440,000	1858	1858
98	Torside	England	Derbyshire	SK0560098300 53.481393°N 1.9170845°W	6,700,000	1848	1864
192	Tunstall	England	County Durham	NZ0650040800 54.762095°N 1.9005097°W	2,360,000	1873	1879
169	Underbank	England	South Yorkshire	SK2530099200 53.488908°N 1.6201667°W	2,955,000	1897	1904
71	Usk	Wales	Carmarthenshire / Powys	SN8217428549 51.942925°N 3.7155557°W	11,235,000	1950	1955
182	Vale House	England	Derbyshire	SK0326097420 53.473502°N 1.9523536°W	2,688,000	1848	1870
15	Vyrnwy	Wales	Powys	SJ0180019300 52.762346°N 3.4567214°W	59,852,000	1879	1888
252	Walthamstow No.4	England	Greater London	TQ3540089100 51.584498°N 0.047100199°W	680,000	1853	1866
253	Walthamstow No.5	England	Greater London	TQ3550088600 51.579981°N 0.045850528°W	680,000	1853	1866
179	Walton - Bessborough	England	Surrey	TQ1220068000 51.399946°N 0.38850014°W	2,757,000	1898	1907
228	Walton - Knight	England	Surrey	TQ1170068000 51.400044°N 0.39568466°W	1,857,000	1898	1907
216	Waskerley	England	County Durham	NZ0250044300 54.793583°N 1.9626426°W	2,046,500	1877	1877
156	Watergrove	England	Greater Manchester	SD9100017700 53.655715°N 2.1376509°W	3,273,000	1930	1938
120	Wayoh	England	Lancashire	SD7370016400 53.643443°N 2.3992954°W	5,100,000	1865	1876
112	Weirwood	England	East Sussex	TQ4060035300 51.099772°N 0.0066761370°E	5,623,000	1950	1954
235	Wentwood	Wales	Newport	ST4300092900 51.632009°N 2.8249355°W	1,739,000	1896	1904
117	West Moor Reservoir	England	Somerset	ST4160032600 51.089725°N 2.8352377°W	5,359,000	NA	NA
255	West Warwick	England	Greater London	TQ3460088300 51.577501°N 0.058946209°W	639,000	1853	1900
151	West Water	Scotland	Scottish Borders	NT1173052377 55.756672°N 3.4080668°W	3,364,000	1966	1969
199	Wet Sleddale	England	Cumbria	NY5530011600 54.497744°N 2.6916824°W	2,282,000	1880	1966
247	White Holme	England	West Yorkshire	SD9710019900 53.675560°N 2.0453756°W	1,601,000	1807	1816
133	Whiteadder	Scotland	East Lothian	NT6540063500 55.863430°N 2.5543847°W	4,239,000	1959	1968
172	Widdop	England	West Yorkshire	SD9300033000 53.793263°N 2.1077415°W	2,912,000	1872	1878
219	Willen Lake	England	Buckinghamshire	SP8810040900 52.059485°N 0.71640948°W	2,004,000	1967	1972
56	William Girling	England	Greater London	TQ3670094100 51.629115°N 0.026400980°W	16,500,000	1935	1951
46	Wimbleball	England	Somerset	SS9670029300 51.053723°N 3.4752172°W	21,541,000	1968	1979
87	Winscar	England	South Yorkshire	SE1530002600 53.519852°N 1.7707125°W	8,300,000	1970	1975
131	Woodhead	England	Derbyshire	SK0820099400 53.491247°N 1.8778781°W	4,700,000	1848	1877
38	Wraysbury	England	Surrey	TQ0250074500 51.460205°N 0.52600813°W	26,910,000	1945	1970
158	Yarrow	England	Lancashire	SD6240015500 53.634662°N 2.5701051°W	3,252,000	1850	1877
155	Ystradfellte	Wales	Powys	SN9460017500 51.846116°N 3.5314738°W	3,277,000	1902	1914

== Largest in England and Wales (2012) ==
Rank	Name	Owner	Location	Year Built	Nominal volume m^{3}	Surface area m^{2}	Ref.
1	Kielder Water	Northumbrian Water	Northumberland	1981	199,000,000	10,860,000	
2	Rutland Water	Anglian Water	Rutland	1976	124,000,000	12,600,000	
3	Haweswater	United Utilities	Cumbria	1935	84,840,000	3,900,000	
4	Llyn Celyn	Welsh Water	Gwynedd	1965	80,930,850	3,300,000	
5	Llyn Brianne	Welsh Water	Powys	1972	64,400,000	2,096,000	
6	Llyn Brenig	Welsh Water	Denbighshire	1976	61,500,000	3,725,000	
7	Lake Vyrnwy	Severn Trent Water	Powys	1888	59,700,000	4,536,000	
8	Grafham Water	Anglian Water	Cambridgeshire	1965	57,800,000	6,280,000	
9	Clywedog Reservoir	Severn Trent Water	Powys	1967	49,940,000	2,490,000	
10	Cow Green Reservoir	Northumbrian Water	Teesdale	1971	40,914,000	3,120,000	
11	Thirlmere	United Utilities	Cumbria	1894	40,714,999	3,290,000	
12	Claerwen	Welsh Water	Powys	1952	40,307,000	2,630,000	
13	Derwent Reservoir	Northumbrian Water	County Durham	1965	40,060,000	4,050,000	
14	Roadford Lake	South West Water	Devon	1989	36,910,000	2,987,000	
15	Carsington Water	Severn Trent Water	Derbyshire	1992	36,331,000	3,000,000	
16	Caban Coch	Welsh Water	Powys	1904	35,531,000	2,023,000	
17	Llyn Trawsfynydd	Magnox Ltd	Gwynedd	1928	33,190,000	4,800,000	
18	Nant y Moch	Statkraft	Ceredigion	1964	32,564,000	2,630,000	
19	Queen Mother Reservoir	Thames Water	Greater London	1976	31,492,000	1,922,000	
20	Bewl Water	Southern Water	East Sussex	1975	31,000,000	3,120,000	
21	Queen Mary Reservoir	Thames Water	Greater London	1931	30,363,000	2,863,000	
22	Colliford Lake	South West Water	Cornwall	1983	29,100,000	3,660,000	
23	Ladybower Reservoir	Severn Trent Water	Derbyshire	1943	27,800,000	2,100,000	
24	Hanningfield Reservoir	Essex and Suffolk Water	Essex	1957	27,721,000	3,536,000	
25	Wraysbury Reservoir	Thames Water	Greater London	1970	26,910,000	2,023,000	
26	Abberton Reservoir	Essex and Suffolk Water	Essex	1939	25,721,000	4,900,000	
27	Llandegfedd Reservoir	Welsh Water	Monmouthshire	1965	24,660,000	1,760,445	
28	Draycote Water	Severn Trent Water	Warwickshire	1969	22,730,000	2,430,000	
29	Grimwith Reservoir	Yorkshire Water	North Yorkshire	1983	22,200,000	1,500,000	
30	Wimbleball Lake	South West Water	Somerset	1979	21,541,000	1,620,000	
31	Chew Valley Lake	Bristol Water	Somerset	1956	20,457,000	4,856,000	
32	Balderhead Reservoir	Northumbrian Water	County Durham	1961	19,618,000	1,170,000	
33	King George VI Reservoir	Thames Water	Greater London	1947	18,732,000	1,420,000	
34	Blithfield Reservoir	South Staffordshire Water	Staffordshire	1953	18,172,000	3,190,000	
35	Pitsford Water	Anglian Water	Northamptonshire	1956	17,545,000	3,030,000	
36	Queen Elizabeth II Reservoir	Thames Water	Greater London	1962	16,809,000	1,283,000	
37	William Girling Reservoir	Thames Water	Greater London	1951	16,500,000	1,350,000	
38	Pontsticill Reservoir	Welsh Water	Powys	1927	15,640,000	1,412,000	
39	Selset Reservoir	Northumbrian Water	County Durham	1960	15,320,000	1,110,000	
40	Alwen Reservoir	Welsh Water	Conwy	1921	14,564,200	1,490,000	
41	King George V Reservoir	Thames Water	Greater London	1912	13,970,000	1,720,000	
42	Foremark Reservoir	Severn Trent Water	Derbyshire	1977	13,193,486	930,000	
43	Usk Reservoir	Welsh Water	Powys	1955	12,253,000	1,160,000	
44	Stocks Reservoir	United Utilities	Lancashire	1932	12,006,000	1,390,000	
45	Talybont Reservoir	Welsh Water	Powys	1939	11,668,000	1,272,000	
46	Covenham Reservoir	Anglian Water	Lincolnshire	1972	10,900,000	882,000	
47	Catcleugh Reservoir	Northumbrian Water	Northumberland	1905	10,480,000	987,000	
48	Scar House Reservoir	Yorkshire Water	North Yorkshire	1936	10,069,000	700,000	

== See also ==
- Reservoirs of Wales
