= Northumbrian Water =

Water company in the United Kingdom

- Type: Private company
- Industry: Water
- Predecessor: Northumbrian Water Authority
- Founded: 1989
- Headquarters: Northumbria House, Abbey Road, Pity Me, Durham, England
- Key people: Heidi Mottram ^{OBE,} CEO
- Products: Drinking water; Recycled wastewater
- Production output: 1.15 Gl/day (drinking); 1.15 Gl/day (recycled)
- Revenue: £821.6 million (2017)
- Operating income: £356.9 million (2017)
- Net income: £201.3 million (2017) (Note: £220.3 million before tax)
- Number of employees: 3,128
- Parent: Northumbrian Water Group
- Website: www.nwl.co.uk

Northumbrian Water Limited is a water company in the United Kingdom, providing mains water and sewerage services in the English counties of Northumberland, Tyne and Wear, Durham and parts of North Yorkshire. Northumbrian Water Limited also supplies water in eastern England under the name Essex and Suffolk Water. It is a wholly owned subsidiary of Northumbrian Water Group.

== Corporate information ==
Northumbrian Water Limited is a private limited company registered in England and Wales under company number 2366703, incorporated in this form in 1989.

== History ==
The Northumbrian Water Authority (NWA) was a regional water authority created under the Water Act 1973. It became Northumbrian Water Limited when privatised in 1989.

The water authority was formed by taking over the existing public water supply infrastructure in the area:

- Darlington Corporation Water Department
- Tynemouth Corporation Waterworks
- Durham County Water Board
- Tees Valley and Cleveland Water Board

Three private statutory water companies operated within its area:

- Hartlepools Water Company
- Newcastle and Gateshead Water Company
- Sunderland and South Shields Water Company

The Newcastle and Gateshead Water Company merged with the Sunderland and South Shields Water Company in 1994 to form North East Water, which itself became part of Northumbrian Water in 1995.

=== Predecessors ===
==== Darlington Corporation Water Department ====
The Darlington Gas and Water Company's undertakings acquired by Darlington Local Board of Heath under the Darlington Local Board Act 1854 (17 & 18 Vict. c. clxxxi), becoming Darlington Corporation Water Department when Darlington became a municipal borough in 1867.

The Darlington Gas and Water Company was created by the Darlington Gas and Waterworks Act 1849 (12 & 13 Vict. c. viii).

==== Tynemouth Corporation Waterworks ====
Tynemouth Corporation Waterworks was created when the Tynemouth Corporation (Water) Act 1897 (60 & 61 Vict. c. ccx) enabled Tynemouth Corporation to take over the private North Shields Waterworks Company.

The North Shields Waterworks Company was formed by the North Shields (Water Supply) Act 1786 (26 Geo. 3. c. 110).

==== Durham County Water Board ====
The Durham County Water Board was created by the Durham County Water Board Act 1920 (10 & 11 Geo. 5. c. xcvi), acquiring the existing private Weardale and Consett Water Company.

The Weardale and Consett Water Company was formed by the Weardale Water Act 1902 (2 Edw. 7. c. clxxiv), which merged the Weardale and Shildon District Waterworks Company and the Consett Waterworks Company.

The Weardale and Shildon District Waterworks Company was formed by the Weardale and Shildon District Waterworks Act 1866 (29 & 30 Vict. c. ccc).

The Consett Waterworks Company was formed by the Consett Waterworks Act 1860 (23 & 24 Vict. c. cx).

==== Tees Valley and Cleveland Water Board ====
The Stockton and Middlesbrough Water Board was renamed to the Tees Valley Water Board by the Tees Valley Waterworks Act 1899 (62 & 63 Vict. c. li).

The Stockton and Middlesbrough Water Board was formed by the Stockton and Middlesbrough Corporations Waterworks Act 1876 (39 & 40 Vict. c. ccxxx), jointly controlled by Stockton Corporation and Middlesbrough Corporation, and acquiring the existing private Stockton and Middlesbrough Waterworks Company.

The Stockton, Middlesbrough, and Yarm Water Company was renamed the Stockton and Middlesbrough Waterworks Company by the Stockton and Middlesbrough Waterworks Act 1858 (21 & 22 Vict. c. cxxxiii).

The Stockton, Middlesbrough, and Yarm Water Company was formed by the Stockton, Middlesbrough, and Yarm Waterworks Act 1851 (14 & 15 Vict. c. xc).

== Area of operations ==
Northumbrian Water's operations cover an area of 9,400 km^{2} and extend from the urban conurbations of Tyneside, Wearside and Teesside to the sparsely populated rural districts of Durham and Northumberland. A small area around Hartlepool is excluded from NW's water supply licence; this area is supplied by Hartlepool Water, a water-only company.

The total population served by NW is 2.7m people using:

- 44 impounding reservoirs
- 57 water treatment works
- 344 water pumping stations
- 338 water service reservoirs
- 25,545 km of water mains
- 418 sewage treatment works
- 765 sewage pumping stations
- 29,724 km of sewers (including the transfer of 13,510 km of private drains and sewers on 1 October 2011)

== Resource zones ==
NW's operations are split between two resource zones: Berwick and Fowberry resource zone; and Kielder resource zone.

=== Berwick and Fowberry ===
This zone covers a small area in north Northumberland, centred on the towns of Berwick and Wooler which has no access to stored water and its water supplies come entirely from an aquifer in the underlying Fell Sandstone, from which water is abstracted via boreholes.

=== Kielder ===
99% of the population served by Northumbrian Water is in the Kielder zone, so named from Kielder Water, the largest reservoir in NW's region. The zone is split into three supply zones, Northern, Central and Southern, which correspond broadly to the catchment areas of the rivers Tyne, Wear and Tees respectively, each of which incorporates one of the region's three conurbations.

Under normal circumstances, each zone is self-sufficient in water resources, but provision exists to transfer water from the northern zone to either of the others, via the Kielder Transfer Scheme.

The zone's water supplies are supported by a system of impounding reservoirs, river pumping stations, and water treatment works. There are 29 impounding reservoirs, of which three—Kielder, Derwent and Cow Green— account for 78% of the available capacity of nearly 360,000 million litres; Kielder Water, with a capacity of 196,000 million litres, alone accounts for 55% of available resources.

Water is supplied to the treatment works either from a nearby reservoir or by abstraction from one of the major rivers. In the latter case, the flow of the river has to be maintained by discharging water from a reservoir further upstream.

==== Northern zone ====
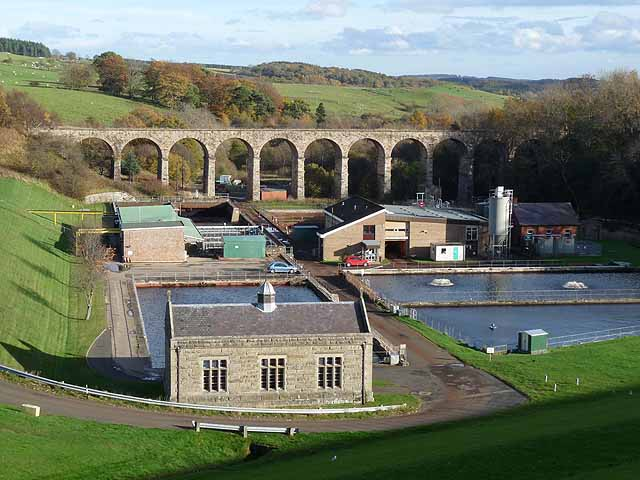
Northumbrian Water's treatment works at Fontburn, Northumberland

The major reservoir in the Northern zone is Kielder Water. Others include: Fontburn, on the River Font, which feeds an adjacent treatment works; and Catcleugh, on the River Rede, which is connected by the Rede pipeline with Gunnerton treatment works, 27 miles (44 km) downstream. Catcleugh is also at the start of a sequence that includes reservoirs at Colt Crag, two at Hallington and a complex of seven at Whittle Dene, where there is also a treatment works.

Within the Northern zone, water is abstracted from the North Tyne at Barrasford and from the Tyne at Ovingham, with discharges from Kielder Water ensuring that the minimum regulated flow is maintained in the two rivers. From Barrasford, water is pumped to West Hallington reservoir, while water abstracted at Ovingham is used to supply Horsley treatment works and can also be used to replenish the Whittle Dene complex. The treatment works at Horsley and Whittle Dean jointly meet the needs of Tyneside and south-east Northumberland.

==== Central zone ====
In the Central zone, the main reservoirs are Derwent and Burnhope; other, smaller reservoirs are at Tunstall and Waskerley, both on Waskerley Beck, and at Smiddy Shaw and Hisehope.

Derwent reservoir supplies Mosswood treatment works, 2 miles (4 km) away, and Burnhope supplies Wear Valley treatment works at Wearhead. With the opening of the new Wear Valley works, in 2004, an older facility at Tunstall was closed, and Tunstall reservoir is now used solely to maintain regulated flow on the Wear. The reservoirs at Waskerley, Hisehope and Smiddy Shaw supply Honey Hill treatment works, which lies just below Smiddy Shaw; Honey Hill is also supplied from Burnhope.

Water is abstracted from the Wear at Chester-le-Street to supply a treatment works at Great Lumley, the minimum flow being maintained through discharges from Burnhope or Tunstall.

In the event that neither Burnhope nor Tunstall can satisfy regulatory discharges to meet the minimum maintained flow on the Wear, water can be transferred into the Wear via the Kielder Transfer Scheme, which can also be used to supplement or replace water from Derwent reservoir or to replenish Waskerley reservoir.

Coastal parts of the Central zone, including Sunderland, are supplied with drinking water from boreholes and shafts that abstract groundwater from aquifers in the underlying Magnesian limestone.

==== Southern zone ====
The largest reservoir in the Southern zone is Cow Green, in upper Teesdale, which is used solely to regulate flow in the River Tees. There are two chains of reservoirs on the Lune and the Balder, tributaries of the Tees, which in combination supply a water treatment works at Lartington, just south of Cotherstone. The main reservoirs are Selset and Grassholme in Lunedale, and Balderhead, Blackton and Hury in Baldersdale. Two further reservoirs, at Lockwood Beck and Scaling Dam, on the North Yorkshire Moors, are no longer used for water supply and serve purely as recreational facilities.

Water is abstracted from the Tees for treatment at the Broken Scar treatment works, near Low Coniscliffe on the outskirts of Darlington, and for industrial water at Blackwell, just downstream from Broken Scar, and Low Worsall, near Kirklevington.

Tees Cottage Pumping Station is sited across the A67 from Broken Scar. This Victorian facility, which closed in 1980, is still owned by Northumbrian Water, but is now opened as a museum by a Preservation Trust. It contains a 1904-built rotative beam engine, and a 1914 gas engine, believed to be the largest working preserved example in Europe.

== Kielder Transfer Scheme ==
The Kielder Transfer Scheme provides a means to utilise the excess capacity of Kielder Water to meet shortfalls in either of the Central and Southern zones.

The heart of the scheme is a 21-mile-long (34 km) tunnel, the Tyne-Tees Tunnel, through which water flows under gravity to outfalls at Frosterley on the Wear and at Eggleston on the Tees. The tunnel is fed by a pipeline, nearly 4 miles long and 6.5 ft (2 metres) in diameter, between Riding Mill, on the Tyne, and Letch House, the high point in the system. There is a direct connection between the tunnel and Mosswood treatment works and further access is provided at Waskerley via a submersible pump in the tunnel's airshaft.

If water is to be transferred, it is abstracted from the Tyne at Riding Mill, a compensating discharge being made from Kielder Water into the North Tyne. From Riding Mill, the water is pumped up the rising main to Letch House, from where it flows downhill through the tunnel.

Under normal conditions, transfers to the Wear and the Tees are not required, as Tunstall and Burnhope reservoirs are usually able to meet the demand for compensating flows on the Wear and Cow Green is able to meet demands on the Tees; since the Scheme became operational, transfers to the Tees have only been required in two years, 1983 and 1989. Transfers to the Central zone are usually required for a period of 12 weeks in the summer, when the reservoirs supplying Honey Hill are unable to meet the full demand.

== Notes and references ==
Notes
