= Tunstall Reservoir =

Reservoir in County Durham, England

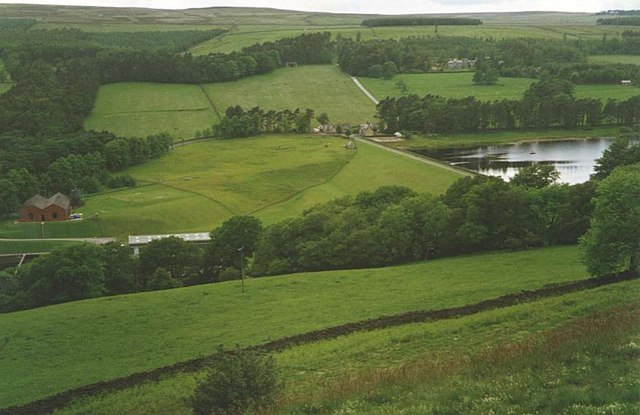
- Tunstall Reservoir, showing the dam and, on the left, the now-disused water treatment works

- Location within County Durham
- Location: County Durham, England
- Coordinates: 54°45′44″N 1°54′03″W
- Type: reservoir
- Catchment area: 23.6 km^{2} (9.1 sq mi)
- Managing agency: Northumbrian Water
- Average depth: 16.9 m (55 ft)
- Max. depth: 22.6 m (74 ft)
- Surface elevation: 220 m (720 ft) asl

Tunstall Reservoir was a water supply storage reservoir completed in 1879, and now used solely to maintain minimum regulatory flows on the River Wear in northeast England. It is situated in the north Pennines of the United Kingdom, and lies 3.5 km north of the village of Wolsingham, in Weardale, County Durham. The earthen embankment dam, which impounds the reservoir, is recognized as the location where pressure grouting with cement grout was first utilized in 1876 by engineer Thomas Hawksley, to reduce leakage within the rock foundation under an earth dam. Pressure grouting has since become normal practice for construction and remediation at dams and related water resource projects.

== Dam construction ==
The reservoir was created for the Weardale and Shildon District Waterworks Company, with construction of the dam between 1873 and 1879. The earth embankment dam was built across the valley of Waskerley Beck, and measures 1,020 feet (310 m) long and 82 feet (25 m) high. It was constructed with a puddle clay core, which extended upward from the cut-off trench excavated into the rock foundation on the hillsides. A seven-foot diameter draw-off tunnel in one abutment controls reservoir elevation.

== Early grouting ==
In 1876, with the reservoir partially filled, water was found percolating through fissures in rock to downstream of the cut-off trench. The supervising engineer, Thomas Hawksley, initially extended the cut-off with brickwork and concrete, but the leakage continued. Faced with few methods to treat such an unsafe condition, Hawksley then adopted the novel technique of pouring or pumping cement grout into holes bored in rock below the trench alignment.

In 1877 and 1878, on another dam for which Hawksley was responsible, the same process was used to reduce underseepage from the Cowm Reservoir in Rochdale; it became the second dam to use grouting for control of leakage. At the Cowm embankment, which was in construction from 1868 and opened in 1877, he injected grout under the cutoff of the embankment. The remedial treatment by grouting was successful until 1886, when leaks reappeared. Further treatment cured them. A tradition avers that Hawksley said "he wished he had never seen Rochdale."

== Changes in ownership and usage ==
As a result of amalgamations, Tunstall reservoir passed to the Weardale and Consett Water Company in 1902 and to the Durham County Water Board in 1920. Following nationalisation and subsequent privatisation, it is now owned and operated by Northumbrian Water.

Until 2004, the reservoir supplied a water treatment works located immediately below the dam wall, but, with the opening of a new treatment works adjacent to Burnhope Reservoir at Wearhead, the Tunstall works was abandoned. The reservoir is now used solely to maintain minimum regulatory flows on the River Wear, in support of raw water abstractions further downstream, at Chester-le-Street.

The reservoir borders the Backstone Bank and Baal Hill Woods Site of Special Scientific Interest. At the northern end of the reservoir, there is a small marshy area where the nationally scare Thread rush, Juncus filiformis, occurs; to protect this, Northumbrian Water has designated the marsh as a private nature reserve. The rest of the reservoir is used by Tunstall fishery for both Boat and Bank Fishing.

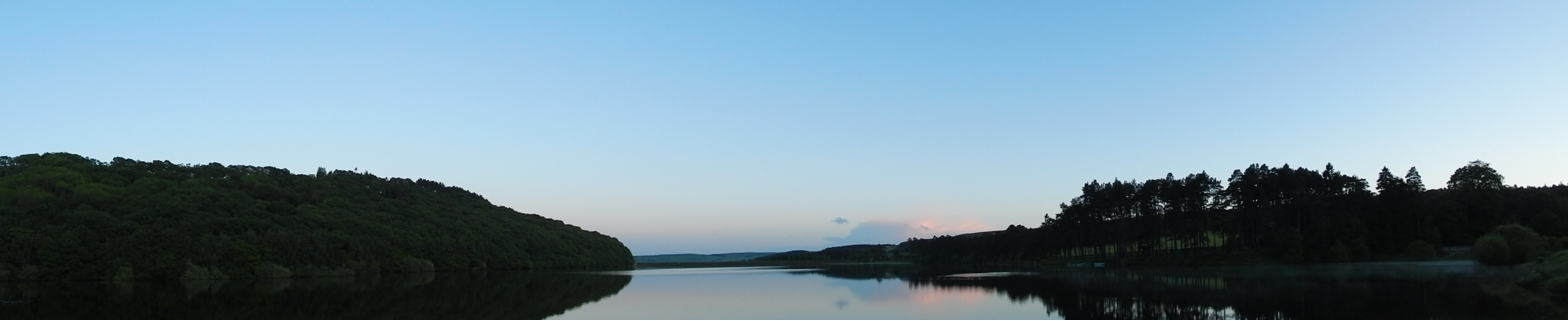
View looking south down Tunstall Reservoir at sunset with Backstone Bank wood on the left.
