= Hartlepool Water =

British water company

- Industry: Water Supply
- Founded: 1846
- Headquarters: Huntingdon, Cambridgeshire, England
- Website: www.hartlepoolwater.co.uk

Hartlepool Water is a water company that covers the town of Hartlepool in County Durham and surrounding area in the North East of England. Since 1997 it has been owned by Anglian Water.

Hartlepool Water does not provide sewerage services. These are provided by Northumbrian Water.

The company was originally formed as the Hartlepool Gas and Water Company by the Hartlepool Gas and Waterworks Act 1846 (9 & 10 Vict. c. cxv). It became Hartlepools Water Company after the gas business was nationalised. It was re-incorporated into Hartlepool Water plc by the Hartlepools Water Company (Constitution and Regulation) Order 1995 (SI 1995/79).

In 2000, the statutory water supply powers in the Hartlepool area were transferred to Anglian Water Services Limited by the Hartlepool Water (Amendment of Local Enactments) Order 2000 (SI 2000/2630), alongside the transfer in April 2000 of all assets and liabilities, with the now non-trading company becoming Hartlepool Water Ltd. one year later in April 2001. The Hartlepool Water was retained as a trading name of Anglia Water in the Hartlepool area.
