= Grafham Water =

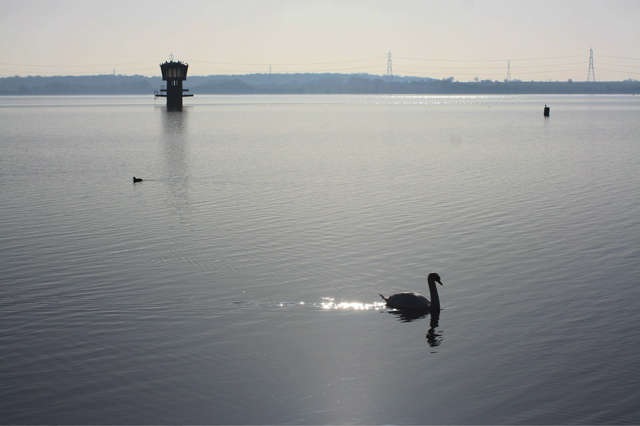
- Grafham Water

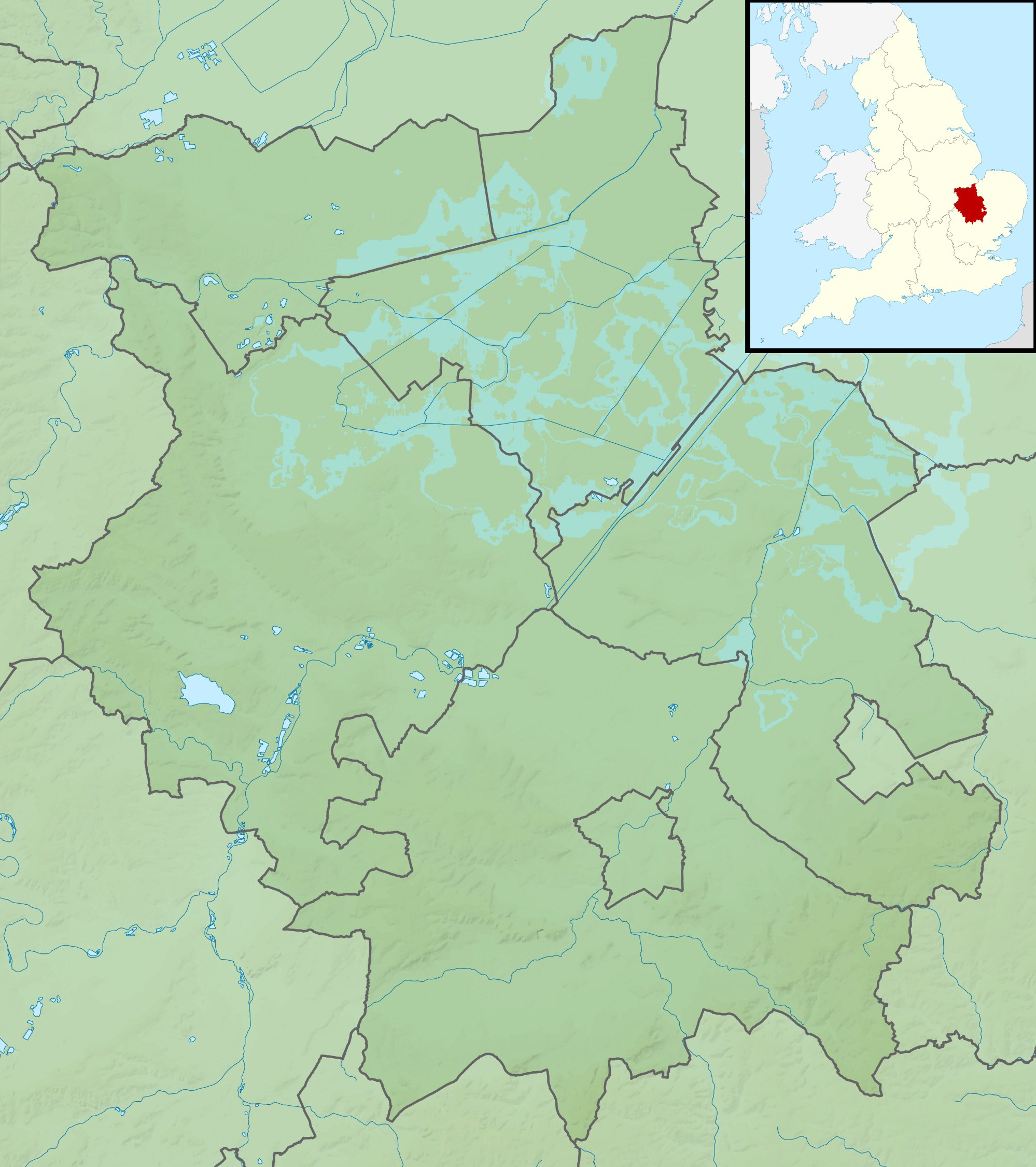
- Location within Cambridgeshire
- Location: Cambridgeshire
- Coordinates: 52.29810°N 0.31504°W
- Lake type: reservoir
- Primary inflows: pumping (River Great Ouse)
- Primary outflows: water treatment
- Managing agency: Anglian Water
- Built: 1965
- Max. length: 4.3 km (2.7 mi)
- Max. width: 2.35 km (1.46 mi)
- Surface area: 6.28 km^{2} (1,550 acres)
- Max. depth: 21 m (69 ft)
- Water volume: 57.8×10^{6} m^{3} (2.04×10^{9} cu ft)
- Shore length^{1}: 16 km (9.9 mi)
- Surface elevation: 42 m (138 ft)
- ^{1} Shore length is not a well-defined measure.

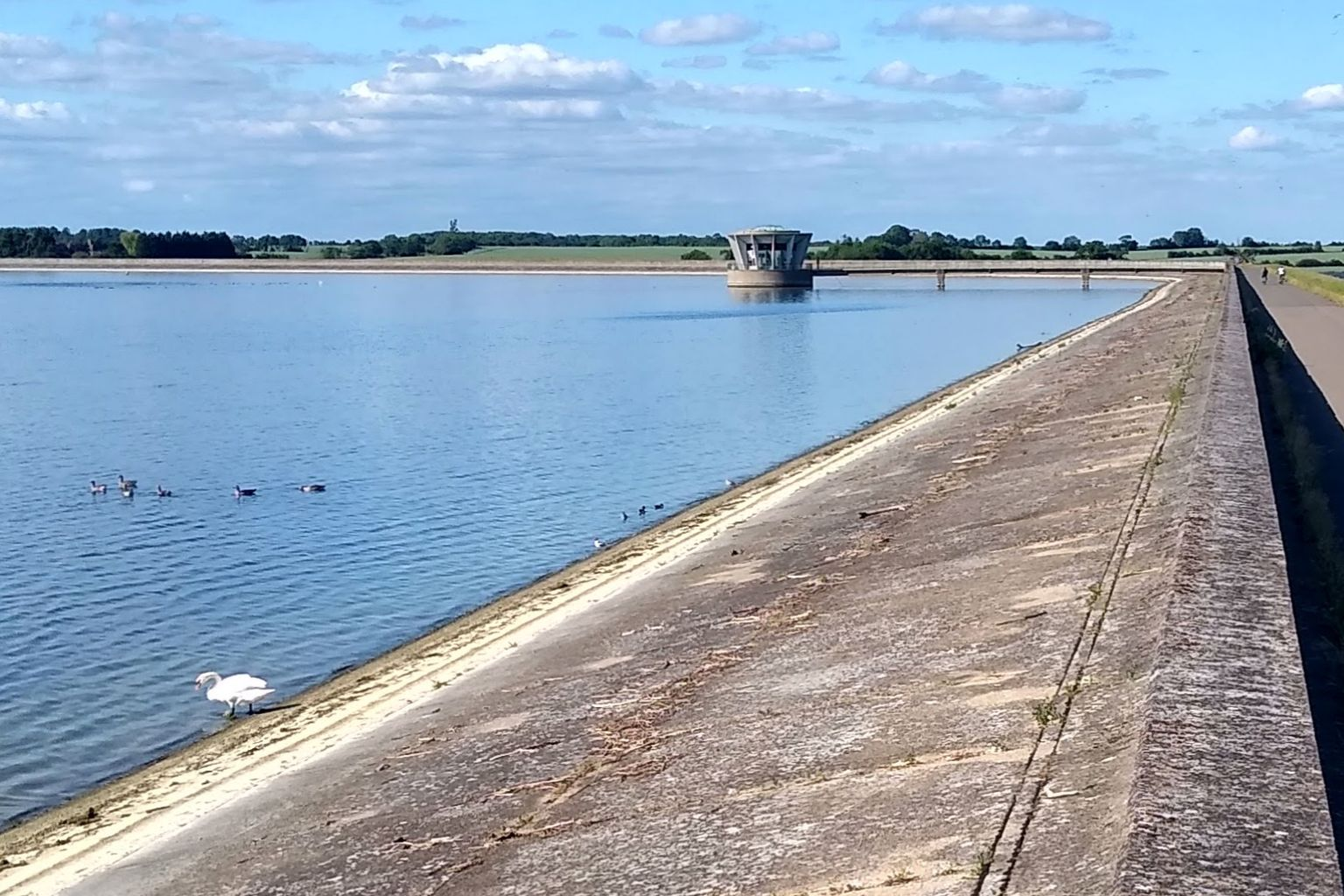
Grafham Water dam and aeration tower

Grafham Water is an 806.3-hectare (1,992-acre) biological Site of Special Scientific Interest (SSSI) north of Perry, Huntingdonshire. It was designated an SSSI in 1986. It is a reservoir with a circumference of about 16 km (10 mi), is 21 m (69 ft) deep at maximum, and is the eighth largest reservoir in England by volume and the joint third largest by area at 6.27 km^{2} (1,550 acres). An area of 114 ha (280 acres) at the western end is a nature reserve managed by the Wildlife Trust for Bedfordshire, Cambridgeshire and Northamptonshire.

== Creation ==
The lake was created by building an earth and concrete dam, constructed by W. & C. French in 1965, and water is extracted and processed at an adjacent Anglian Water treatment plant before being piped away as drinking water. It was shown from the air, before it opened, in 'Look at Life (film series)' ' 1965 episode, 'Will Taps Run Dry ?', narrated by Tim Turner.

== Wildlife ==
The reservoir was immediately colonised by wildlife and a nature reserve was created at the western side of the reservoir. The nature reserve contains semi-natural ancient (at least 400 years old) woodlands and more recent plantation woodlands, grasslands and wetland habitats such as reedbeds, willow and open water. The reservoir has nationally important numbers of wintering great crested grebes, tufted ducks and coots, and of moulting mute swans in late summer. A pond has a population of the nationally uncommon warty newt.

As of January 2011, it was the only site in England, and the first in the UK, to harbour the invasive killer shrimp (Dikerogammarus villosus).

== Operation and use ==
Water is obtained by pumping water from the River Great Ouse nearby. There are two pumping stations associated with the reservoir. One is located just behind the dam, the other at Offord Cluny alongside the River Great Ouse. At times of high potential flood risk, Grafham Water treatment works can increase the amount of water it takes up to maximum capacity to help reduce the risk of flooding along the river.

Grafham Water is popular for a range of leisure activities including sailing, fly fishing and cycling.

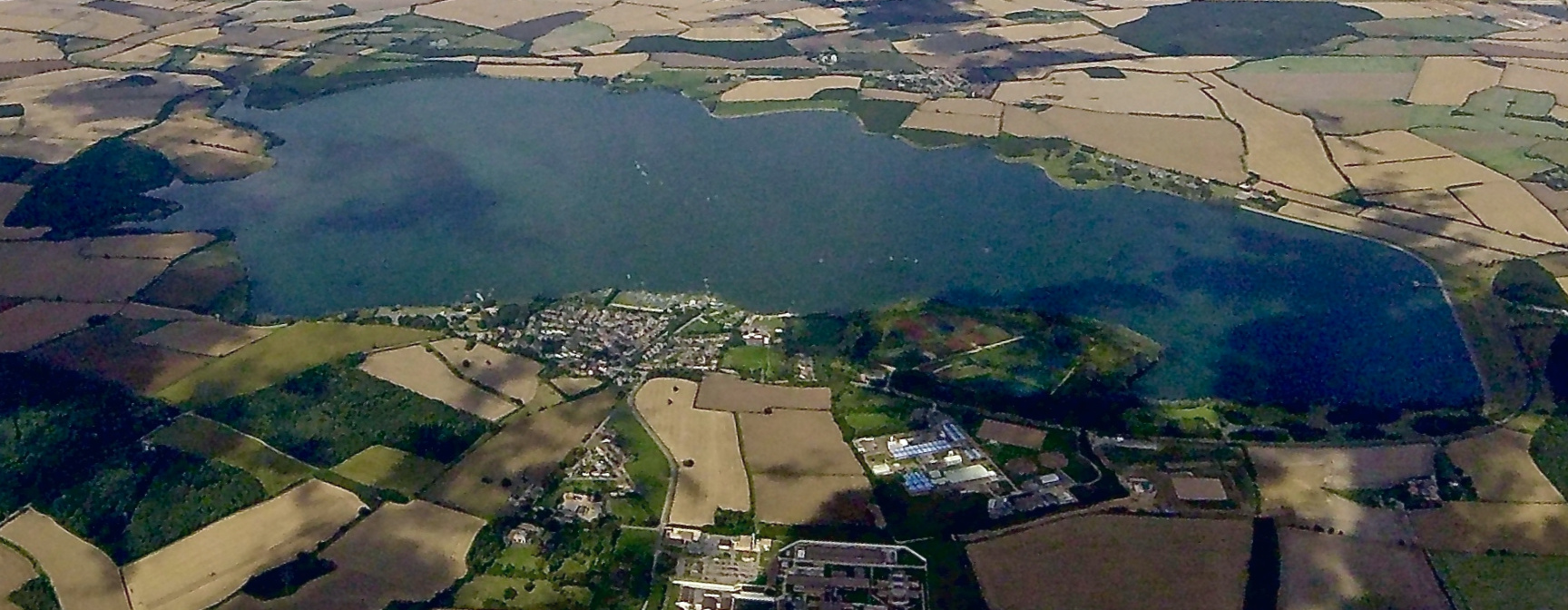
The Grafham Water reservoir from the air

== See also ==
- List of reservoirs and dams in the United Kingdom
