= Little Swinburne Reservoir =

- Location within Northumberland
- Location: Northumberland
- Coordinates: 55.090°N 2.087°W
- Type: Reservoir
- Basin countries: England
- Surface area: 8.4 acres (3.4 ha)
- Surface elevation: 531 feet (162 m)

Little Swinburne Reservoir is a small reservoir in Northumberland, England less than 1 mile (1.6 km) northeast of the A68 road, and about 9 miles (14 km) north of Corbridge. The A68 road generally follows the course of Dere Street, a Roman road, but has deviated at this point a little to the east, to facilitate a bridge crossing of the Swin Burn.

== History ==
The reservoir was built at the end of the 19th century for the Newcastle and Gateshead Water Company. The reservoir forms part of a series of reservoirs along the A68 which are connected by tunnels and aqueducts from Catcleugh Reservoir to Whittle Dene; from where drinking water is supplied to Newcastle upon Tyne, Gateshead, and some surrounding areas. The reservoirs that form the chain are, from northwest to southeast: Catcleugh Reservoir → Colt Crag Reservoir → Little Swinburne Reservoir → Hallington Reservoirs → Whittle Dene.

The first proposals for a reservoir on the Swin Burn were submitted to Parliament in 1854 by the Whittle Dean Water Company. They needed additional sources of pure water, highlighted by a disastrous outbreak of cholera in Newcastle and Gateshead in 1853, from which 1,527 people died. Their bill included provision for the building of an aqueduct which would gather water from a number of streams in the North Tyne catchment. This water would be stored in a reservoir to the north-east of Swinburne Castle, from where another aqueduct would carry the water to the River Pont near Matfen, passing through a tunnel at Ryal, where higher ground otherwise prevented the water flowing by gravity. A House of Commons select committee began considering the proposals in March 1854.

The company's engineer was James Simpson, but it appears that Thomas Hawksley supported the bill on its passage through Parliament, an engineer who had a reputation for being particularly good at presenting complex information in a clear fashion. Both men had visited the sites of the proposed works in early March, to assess what could be done to placate Thomas Riddell, who owned some of the land on which the aqueduct would be built. The company made him an offer, which he refused, making a counter claim for £7,600 in compensation, to which the company could not agree. Samuel Homersham, an engineer speaking against the bill, suggested that an additional reservoir at Whittle Dean could be built, and the opposition succeeded in having the clauses for the aqueduct to the west of Swinburne Castle and the reservoir removed from the bill. Some of Riddell's other proposals were rejected, including a clause to prevent the company from ever extracting water to the west of the Small Burn, and another to ensure that the company would ensure minimum flows in various streams, with financial penalties if they failed to do so. The bill became the Whittle Dean Waterworks Act 1854 (17 & 18 Vict. c. lx) on 2 June 1854.

The next proposal for the Swinburne area was made in 1873 by George Henry Hill, who was learning his trade by assisting the engineer John Frederick Bateman. Hill stated that measurements over ten years had shown that rainfall in the Swinburne area was 28.2 inches (720 mm) per year, and that collecting water from some 4,400 acres (1,800 ha) would yield an additional 3.75 million imperial gallons (17.0 Ml) for the company. He further proposed a reservoir on the Swin Burn, a second reservoir to augment the storage capacity at Hallington, and an aqueduct or tunnel to convey water between the two. Following an unprecedented period of dry weather lasting for 560 days and ending in November 1874, a reservoir on the Swin Burn was again considered, and Hill again recommended proceeding. The directors agreed to proceed with plans for Swinburne reservoir, and a second reservoir, which became known as Little Swinburne, for which a bill was submitted to Parliament in February 1876.

By the time the bill was submitted, it contained proposals for three reservoirs, of which Little Swinburne was the only one actually built. Lower Swinburne reservoir was immediately to the south west of Little Swinburne, while Upper Swinburne was to the north of it. The bill also included plans for West Hallington reservoir, to the south west of the first Hallington reservoir. There was opposition to the bill from Newcastle and Gateshead councils, from the Chamber of Commerce, and from John Gifford Riddell, the son of Thomas Riddell. The towns eventually withdrew their opposition, but Riddell's complaint was that the works would severely damage his 7,000-acre (2,800 ha) estate, and that its engineering was unsound. He proposed three alternatives for reservoirs on the Warksburn, at the Northumberland Lakes, and on his own estate. Hill stated that the capacities of the three reservoirs would be 417 million imperial gallons (1,900 Ml) for Upper Swinburne, 194 million imperial gallons (880 Ml) for Little Swinburne, and 345 million imperial gallons (1,570 Ml) for Lower Swinburne.

Riddell's proposal was for a reservoir of 1,043 million imperial gallons (4,740 Ml), more than that of the upper and lower reservoirs combined. He was supported by Richard Cail, a local civil engineering contractor and builder, although the idea was actually that of a mining engineer called Thomas John Bewick. They argued that the lower reservoir was too low for all of its capacity to be useful, as it was below the elevation where gravity could be used to feed the water into the rest of the company's system. The select committee decided that plans for the lower reservoir should be removed from the bill, and it then became the Newcastle and Gateshead Waterworks Act 1876 (39 & 40 Vict. c. cxcii) in July 1876. Work did not start immediately, but in October, Bateman was asked to proceed with the detailed design of the aqueduct between Swinburne and Hallington, and in December Little Swinburne reservoir was added to his remit. Exploratory borings were made in January 1877, but by then the directors had decided to abandon their plans for Upper Swinburne reservoir, and instead proceed with that proposed by Bewick and Riddell, for which they obtained the Newcastle and Gateshead Waterworks Act 1877 (40 & 41 Vict. c. lxxxvii) on 12 July 1877. It became known as Colt Crag reservoir.

The company offered Riddell £8,000 for the land needed for the Little Swinburne reservoir and aqueduct, while Riddell argued it was worth £22,600. The decision went to arbitration, and the court decided that the company's offer was reasonable. When work began, the company refused to employ two policemen, as requested by Riddell, but did agree to his request that £50 per year should be paid to the Navvy Mission for scripture readers. The contract for construction was awarded to Rigby of Worksop, and the aqueduct between Swinburne and Hallington was commissioned in late 1879. By March 1880, the depth of water in the reservoir had reached 40 feet (12 m).

No major work was needed to the reservoir until 1946, when the tunnel between Little Swinburne and Hallington collapsed, while in 1948 the overflow was improved, following similar work at Hallington in the previous year. Responsibility for the reservoirs passed to the Northumbrian Water Authority in April 1974, as a result of the passing of the Water Act 1973. It then passed to Northumbrian Water when the water industry was privatised in 1989.

== Bibliography ==
- Porter, Elizabeth (1978). Water Management in England and Wales. Cambridge University Press. ISBN 978-0-521-21865-8.
- Rennison, Robert William (1979). Water to Tyneside. Newcastle and Gateshead Water Company. ISBN 978-0-9506547-0-6.
- SRM (2008). "Structure of the UK Water Industry". Water Research Centre. Archived from the original on 3 May 2017.
