= Newcastle and Gateshead Water Company =

Former English water filtration company

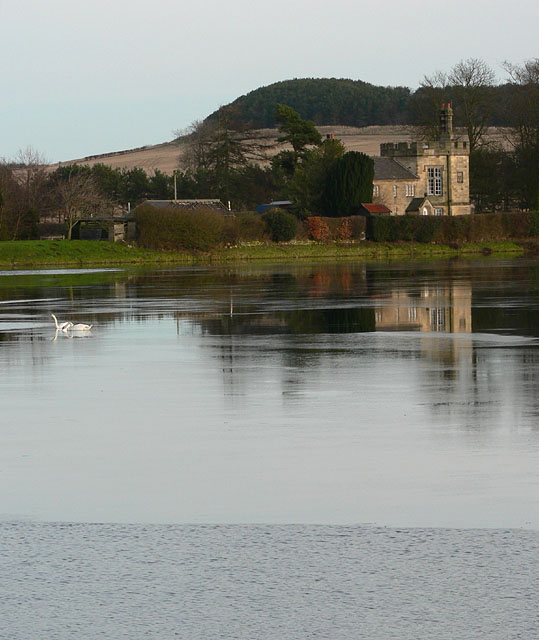
- Whittle Dean Reservoir and the Superintendent's House
- Industry: Water and sewage
- Founded: 1845
- Defunct: 1974
- Fate: nationalized
- Successor: Northumbrian Water Authority
- Headquarters: Newcastle upon Tyne, England

The Newcastle and Gateshead Water Company supplied drinking water to the towns of Newcastle upon Tyne and Gateshead, in the north east of England, from 1845 until 1974. It was initially called the Whittle Dean Water Company, but changed its name in 1863, and gradually increased the area which it supplied. It merged with the Sunderland and South Shields Water Company in 1992 to form North East Water, which was merged into Northumbrian Water in 1995.

== Early history ==
Newcastle and Gateshead were relatively small places despite being important for the export of coal, and it was not until the arrival of the railways in the second quarter of the nineteenth century that the population began to increase significantly. It became an important centre for engineering, a chemical industry developed, and following improvements to the River Tyne by the Tyne Improvement Commission, established in 1850, the trade in coal increased rapidly.

Newcastle upon Tyne Water Supply Act 1697
- Act of Parliament
- Parliament of England
- Long title: An Act for the better supplying the Town of Newcastle upon Tyne with fresh Water.
- Citation: 9 Will. 3. c. 46 Pr.
- Territorial extent: England and Wales

Dates
- Royal assent: 5 July 1698
- Commencement: 3 December 1697 (Note: Start of session.)

Status: Current legislation

Both towns were initially dependent on springs for the supply of water, but in 1680 Cuthbert Dykes built an engine at Sandgate to supply Newcastle with water extracted from the Tyne. Details are not known, but it was presumably water powered. In Gateshead, water was obtained from springs located outside of the town and supplied to the residents by the Ellison family. Both schemes were superseded by a new system, proposed by William Yarnold in 1697. He negotiated with the Common Council of Newcastle to allow him to lay pipes and build storage cisterns, but also took the precaution of obtaining an act of Parliament to authorise the works, with the Newcastle upon Tyne Water Supply Act 1697 (9 Will. 3. c. 46 Pr.) being granted in 1698. Water for both towns was obtained from springs at Heworth Common, to the south of Gateshead. He built two reservoirs with earth embankments in Gateshead, and the water was distributed through wooden pipes. The supply to Newcastle was carried across the Tyne Bridge in a lead pipe, and fed the cisterns, from where it was piped to houses. The supply was only available on one day a week, with some 50,000 imperial gallons (230 m^{3}) being supplied each week, but the scheme was not a financial success, and Yarnold soon left. Nevertheless, the works continued to operate until 1770, supplying 161 properties. During this period the Common Council also supplied water to street fountains, known locally as pants, at no cost to the residents.

In 1769 Ralph Lodge proposed taking over the Common Council's supply, but they did not give their full approval. Lodge developed a source of water at Coxlodge, around 3 miles (4.8 km) north of the town, and came to an arrangement with the council to build a reservoir on the Town Moor. He bought up Yarnold's works, so that there would not be two competing systems in the towns, and although there were complaints from the council in 1785, with the council threatening to obtain their own act of Parliament to construct works if things did not improve, they did not pursue this course of action, and Lodge's works continued to operate until 1797, when they were taken over by an insurance company, the Newcastle Fire Office. They sunk a shaft at Coxlodge, to tap into flooded coal workings, and the water fed a new reservoir on Town Moor through a 10-inch (250 mm) diameter pipe. They were supplying 75,000 imperial gallons (340 m^{3}) per day, but the supply was only available for two days per week.

1831 was a disastrous year for the Newcastle Fire Office, as some of their springs dried up and the shaft was damaged, requiring them to construct a new one. They used carts to distribute river water to customers while trying to resolve the situation, which led to an outbreak of cholera. Between December 1831 and March 1832, 306 people died of the disease in Newcastle and 234 in Gateshead. The link between the use of river water and the disease was not clearly understood at the time, and after the epidemic was over, the company proposed a scheme to filter river water on a permanent basis, but did not proceed with this option.

=== Newcastle Subscription Water Company ===
Newcastle-upon-Tyne Water Act 1834
- Act of Parliament
- Parliament of the United Kingdom
- Long title: An Act for better supplying with Water the Town and County of the Town of Newcastle-upon-Tyne, and the Neighbourhood thereof.
- Citation: 4 & 5 Will. 4. c. xviii
- Territorial extent: United Kingdom

Dates
- Royal assent: 22 May 1834
Other legislation
Repealed by	Whittle Dean Waterworks Act 1854

Status: Repealed

Text of statute as originally enacted

The Newcastle Subscription Water Company was first proposed in November 1832, at the same time as the Newcastle Fire Office were expressing their regrets at their difficulties. While the prospectus for the new company made much of service to the townspeople, the aims were clearly to break the monopoly of the Newcastle Fire Office and to make money for investors. There was some hostility between the two companies, and when a bill was put before Parliament, the corporation found that they did not have the powers to allow the new company to open up the streets to lay water mains, as they had previously granted exclusive rights to do this to the old company. Petitions were presented both for and against the new company, and there were allegations that the Newcastle Fire Office withheld water for fire fighting if a building was not insured with them. The bill eventually became the Newcastle-upon-Tyne Water Act 1834 (4 & 5 Will. 4. c. xviii) on 22 May 1834.

The Fire Office sought tenders for new cast-iron pipes, to replace wooden ones, and the enlargement of Swan Pond to form Carr Hill reservoir. The Subscription Company could only supply Newcastle and the surrounding settlements, with Gateshead specifically excluded. They constructed a pumping station at Elswick, to pump water from the river to a reservoir at Arthur's Hill. Much of the work was carried out before the enabling act of Parliament was obtained. Robert Hawthorn supplied the pump in 1834, it being the first Cornish engine to be manufactured in the North-East. The Subscription Company filtered the water before pumping it to their reservoir, the filters covering 10,000 square feet (930 m^{2}), and being capable of supplying 400,000 imperial gallons (1,800 m^{3}) per day. The designer of the works is unclear, with Thomas Hawksley, Joseph Glynn and Joshua Richardson all claiming to have done so.

Antagonism between the two companies continued for a short while, but in 1836 the Fire Office sold their works to the Subscription Company for £15,000. The new company thus were able to supply Gateshead as well as Newcastle, and served a population of some 80,000. Water was still only supplied intermittently, and this caused controversy when fires broke out, although the directors of the Subscription Company also owned the Tyne Mercury newspaper, which did not report events if they were not favourable to the company's reputation. In the aftermath of a fire at John Atkinson's coachworks, where water had not initially been available, a new company was proposed. Newcastle were supportive of the plans for Newcastle and Gateshead Union Water Company, but Gateshead appointed a committee to check progress, and as the bill went through Parliament, proposed significant changes, including the requirement that the mains should be pressurised at all times. An act of Parliament was obtained on 19 June 1840, to allow extraction of water from the River Pont and from the drainage of Prestwick Carr, but no further progress was made. The Subscription Company tried to improve their supplies, but there were regular complaints that the water was sometimes brackish.

=== Whittle Dean Water Company ===
The 1840s saw Edwin Chadwick championing sanitation for the poor, with the publication of his Report on The Sanitary Condition of the Labouring Population of Great Britain in 1842 summing up three years of research. A royal commission then looked into the sanitary conditions in the major towns of England and Wales. Dr Robert Reid, who visited Newcastle in December 1843 and January 1844 for the commission, found the poor living in overcrowded conditions. In Pipewellgate, just three privies served a population of 2,040. In Gateshead, which Reid calculated had a population of 38,747, there was only one sewer of about 100 yards (91 m). Water was sold to the rich relatively cheaply, but the poor paid five times as much for the same water. In a second report published by the commission in 1845, Newcastle was criticised, because only 8 percent of the houses were supplied with water directly, the water was often of poor quality, and the charges to the poor were unjust.

Whittle Dean Waterworks Act 1845
- Act of Parliament
- Parliament of the United Kingdom
- Long title: An Act for supplying the Borough and County of Newcastle-upon-Tyne and the Borough of Gateshead in the County of Durham, and the Neighbourhoods thereof, with Water, from Whittle Dean in the Parish of Ovingham, and other Places in Northumberland.
- Citation: 8 & 9 Vict. c. lxxi
- Territorial extent: United Kingdom

Dates
- Royal assent: 30 June 1845
- Commencement: 30 June 1845 (Note: The Acts of Parliament (Commencement) Act 1793.)
- Repealed: 2 June 1854
Other legislation
Repealed by	Whittle Dean Waterworks Act 1854

Status: Repealed

During this period, plans were formulated for the Whittle Dean Water Company, with a reservoir at Whittle Dean, capable of holding a year's supply of water. The men behind the scheme were Richard Grainger, an eminent builder, Thomas Sopwith, a consulting engineer, and the industrialist William George Armstrong. They wrote to the Duke of Northumberland to see if they could carry out exploratory work, and were informed that the Duke would support the scheme if it was one in which the inhabitants of Newcastle would take an interest, rather than a private enterprise to make money for the promoters. The Duke's interest is shown by the fact that he recommended that the main pipeline should be increased from 18 inches (460 mm) to 24 inches (610 mm) diameter, and his recommendation was accommodated. Newcastle Council were impressed by the calibre of those promoting the company, which included medical doctors, the mayor and four former mayors, together with leading industrialists. A bill was presented to Parliament on 28 February 1845, and after Sopwith, Armstrong, Grainger and the engineer James Simpson gave evidence, the Whittle Dean Waterworks Act 1845 (8 & 9 Vict. c. lxxi) received royal assent on 30 June 1845. The Subscription Company had sought to oppose the bill, but agreed to sell their undertaking to the new company for £55,000. This allowed them to use the existing reservoirs and pipework of the Subscription Company, saving the cost of duplicating these facilities. A subscription list was opened, but after seven days, requests for shares totalling £160,000 had been received, and so it was closed again.

The Whittle Dean Water Company was established with a working capital of £150,000, and powers to borrow up to £50,000, if required. Plans to extract water from the River Pont and the Tyne, which were part of the original bill, were dropped, as the Whittle Dean could supply 1.7 million imperial gallons (7.7 Ml) per day, double the amount estimated to supply Newcastle and Gateshead. With Simpson as Chief Engineer, the company used the existing infrastructure while their new works were being constructed. They renewed the lease on Carr Hill reservoir, and found that the four reservoirs on Town Moor were better than expected, only needing to be cleaned and repaired. Simpson had pioneered the use of filters, and those at Elswick were renewed. Dawson, the superintendent, was asked to conduct experiments to see if water could be supplied every day, rather than every second day as had happened under the Subscription Company. A 30 hp (22 kW) pump was installed at Holmes Close ponds in Gateshead, to pump water to Carr Hill reservoir. Tenders to construct the reservoirs at Whittle Dean were invited on 16 January 1846, and the contract was awarded to Ridley and Atkinson on 11 February.

At the first annual general meeting held on 30 January 1846, the company pledged to provide a constant supply of water to all properties. Measurement had shown that Whittle Dean could supply 3 million imperial gallons (14 Ml) per day. Armstrong was appointed as secretary to the company, which would take over the offices of the Subscription Company in the Royal Arcade. Armstrong had previously written to the town council, suggesting that water from the mains could be used to power hydraulic cranes, to enable ships to be loaded and unloaded more cheaply, and since he offered to convert one of the cranes at his own expense to prove the concept, his offer was accepted. Its success led to further cranes being erected in 1847, and Armstrong formed a partnership with the Newcastle Craneage Company to manufacture hydraulic machinery, which led to the formation of the engineering industry and a significant increase in the population.

Robert Nicholson oversaw the construction of five reservoirs at Whittle Dean, on which around 200 men were employed, and tenders were invited for 12 miles (19 km) of 24-inch (610 mm) diameter pipeline. By February 1848, work on the reservoirs was nearly finished, but although the number of houses supplied directly with water had risen from 3,205 to 6,788 in the previous year, this still only represented about one third of the houses in the towns. By September, the pipeline was being tested, and the Whittle Dean works were completed in the following month. The benefit of the new scheme was soon seen, as there was a national outbreak of cholera in December 1848, but "Newcastle escaped almost unscathed", which was attributed to the unpolluted water supply. Nearby North Shields, which drew its water from the Tyne, was much less fortunate.

Whittle Dean Waterworks Amendment Act 1853 (Note: Section 2.)
- Act of Parliament
- Parliament of the United Kingdom
- Long title: An Act to amend the Act relating to the Whittle Dean Water Company, and to enable such Company to maintain additional Works, for better supplying with Water the Inhabitants of the Boroughs of Newcastle-upon-Tyne and Gateshead, and certain Places adjacent and near thereto, in the Counties of Northumberland and Durham.
- Citation: 16 & 17 Vict. c. iv
- Territorial extent: United Kingdom

Dates
- Royal assent: 9 May 1853
- Commencement: 9 May 1853
- Repealed: 2 June 1854
Other legislation
Amends	Whittle Dean Waterworks Act 1845
Repealed by	Whittle Dean Waterworks Act 1854

Status: Repealed

Text of statute as originally enacted

The directors decided to retain the Elswick works, to be used if the new works at Whittle Dean could not supply enough water. They were supplying water to an increasing number of industrial clients, and they were soon facing problems. Another small reservoir was built at Whittle Dean in 1850, but with rainfall in 1850 being the lowest for many years, water was also obtained from the Town Moor, the Coxlodge shaft and pumping from the Tyne restarted. Consumption had risen from 0.7 million imperial gallons (3.2 Ml) per day in 1845 to 1.6 million imperial gallons (7.3 Ml) per day in 1850. Land surrounding the Whittle Dean reservoirs was drained to augment the supply, and negotiations to use the River Pont were started. The network was still being expanded rapidly, to supply additional houses and factories in Gateshead. The company opposed parts of Newcastle's Town Improvements Bill, as it would make digging up streets to lay pipes more difficult, and also promoted their own bill to include more parishes in their area of supply, to increase their working capital, and to regularise the construction of the Great Northern reservoir at Whittle Dean, which had already been built. The Whittle Dean Waterworks Amendment Act 1853 (16 & 17 Vict. c. iv) was obtained in May 1853, and the company took pride in the fact that water was available 24 hours per day, whereas in London this would not be achieved until 1899. However, on 2 September 1853, the first of many to die of cholera occurred in Newcastle, and the company came under severe scrutiny from the town authorities.

=== Expansion ===
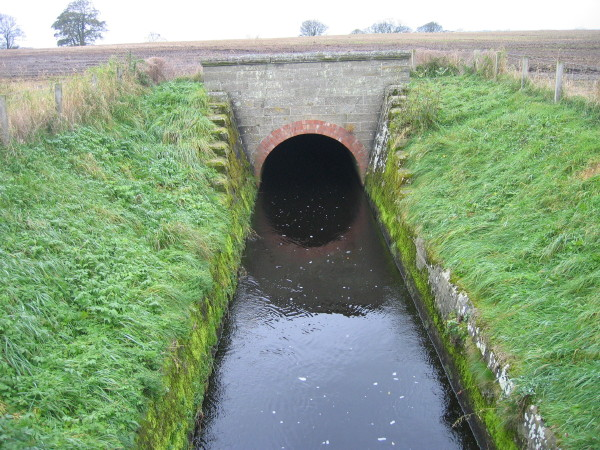
The southern end of the tunnel beneath Thornham Hill, which carries water from the River Pont to Whittle Dean. It was completed in 1859.

With deaths from cholera rising rapidly, the Whittle Dean Water Company hastily built a dam across the Matfen branch of the River Pont, which supplied 6 million imperial gallons (27 Ml) along a culvert to the Whittle Dean reservoirs in just three days. The cholera epidemic subsided after pumping was stopped on 15 September, but not before 1,527 deaths had occurred in Newcastle. A deputation from the town council on the same day was informed that the company had stopped pumping, and that it would never be restarted. This meant that they had to inform several industrial consumers that water would be severely limited until the emergency was over. They contacted the engineer James Simpson on 26 September to advise on how their resources could be increased, while the Town Council formed a committee to "regulate the sanitary measures in the town". They contacted John Frederick Bateman and Thomas Hawksley and considered setting up their own water company, but the idea was dropped as the Whittle Dean Water Company made progress.

Whittle Dean Waterworks Act 1854
- Act of Parliament
- Parliament of the United Kingdom
- Long title: An Act for enabling the Whittle Dean Water Company to extend their Works, and to obtain a further Supply of Water from certain Rivers and Streams in the County of Northumberland, in order to afford a better Supply of Water to the Inhabitants of Newcastle-upon-Tyne, Gateshead, and other Places in the Counties of Northumberland and Durham; and for consolidating and amending the Acts relating to such Company.
- Citation: 17 & 18 Vict. c. lx
- Territorial extent: United Kingdom

Dates
- Royal assent: 2 June 1854
- Commencement: 2 June 1854
- Repealed: 11 May 1863
Other legislation
Repeals/revokes	Newcastle-upon-Tyne Water Act 1834; Whittle Dean Waterworks Act 1845; Whittle Dean Waterworks Amendment Act 1853
Repealed by	Newcastle and Gateshead Waterworks Act 1863

Status: Repealed

Text of statute as originally enacted

Simpson, working with the Whittle Dean engineer John Nicholson, produced a report on 24 October 1853, and a bill was submitted to Parliament. Negotiations with mill owners on the River Pont meant that they withdrew their objections, and the bill became the Whittle Dean Waterworks Act 1854 (17 & 18 Vict. c. lx) on 2 June 1854. It would allow water to be taken from the River Pont, and conveyed to Whittle Dean by an aqueduct, where the Great Southern reservoir would be built. The act included clauses, inserted by the town council, allowing them to buy the new works within ten years, and ensuring that water could only be pumped from the Tyne if they gave their consent. The works on the Town Moor were to be abandoned, as the water was contaminated by cattle. The epidemic was followed by a fire, started by an explosion in Gateshead, which destroyed 800 homes, but on this occasion, the water company came off well, as the pressure in the mains far exceeded that produced by fire engines, and some 7 million imperial gallons (32 Ml) were taken from standpipes to extinguish the blaze, at no cost to the town.

A new pumping station was built at Newburn, which reused the engine from Elswick, and obtained water from the river after it had passed through 33 feet (10 m) of gravel. The new reservoir at Whittle Dean was nearly completed by the end of 1855. Plans for the aqueduct to bring water from the River Pont were varied somewhat from the parliamentary plans, and its size was subsequently increased. The final part of the scheme was an aqueduct to intercept streams between Hallington and Ryal, which included a tunnel. There were problems, with two contractors failing to complete it, but a third finally succeeded and the work was finished on 31 December 1859. The tunnel was 3,887 yards (3,554 m) long, and had been excavated from up to 20 faces at a time. A proposed reservoir at Elswick was moved to Benham, and a pumping engine to ensure houses in the higher parts of Newcastle could have water was installed, while pumps at Gateshead were upgraded. The unused site at Elswick was sold to the gas company. The company experienced some difficulties, with equipment breaking down, pipes bursting, reservoirs leaking and further dry years in 1858 and 1859, but by 1861, they were supplying 26,065 tenants, with consumption having risen seven-fold since 1845, to 5 million imperial gallons (23 Ml) per day.

=== Newcastle and Gateshead Water Company ===
Although the new works were finished, the company received regular complains and letters in the newspapers about the quality of the water. They approached Simpson, Hawksley and Bateman to see what could be done, and wrote to Newcastle Corporation explaining the difficulties. Bateman came to observe the situation in August 1861, and noted that the water contained vegetable and animal matter. He suggested changes to the way the Great Northern reservoir was used to improve the water quality, and that an additional engine was needed in Gateshead to pump water to Carr Hill reservoir. This was implemented, and one of the reservoirs was re-used as a cooling pond for the engines. Both Newcastle and Gateshead were expanding rapidly, onto higher ground away from the river, and most of the new houses had water closets, with many also having baths. The demand for water was increasing correspondingly.

Batesman's second report, produced on 8 October 1861, dealt with increasing supplies. He suggested diverting the Swinburn, building a new reservoir at Hallington, and installing a new pipeline between Newcastle and the Great Northern reservoir. Filters would be built at Benwell, supplied from a 24-inch (610 mm) pipeline from Newburn. This would be adequate until consumption exceeded 10 million imperial gallons (45 Ml) per day. The company then proposed a separate supply for manufacturers, pumped from the river, which would increase the amount of water available for domestic users. Bateman suggested that a new reservoir at Swinburn would be needed in due course. When constructed, the size of the new pipeline from Newburn to Benwell was increased to 30 inches (760 mm), with that from Benwell into the town remaining at 24-inch (610 mm). Further problems were caused by leakage from the reservoirs at Fenham and Benwell, due to the Delaval Coal Company mining coal from beneath them.

Newcastle and Gateshead Waterworks Act 1863
- Act of Parliament
- Parliament of the United Kingdom
- Long title: An Act for better supplying with Water the Towns of Newcastle-upon-Tyne and Gateshead, and the Neighbourhood thereof, and for amending and consolidating the Provisions of the Acts relating to the Whittle Dean Water Company.
- Citation: 26 & 27 Vict. c. xxxiv
- Territorial extent: United Kingdom

Dates
- Royal assent: 11 May 1863
- Commencement: 11 May 1863
Other legislation
Repeals/revokes	Whittle Dean Waterworks Act 1854
Amended by	Newcastle and Gateshead Waterworks Act 1866; Newcastle and Gateshead Waterworks Act 1922; Newcastle and Gateshead Waterworks Act 1935; Newcastle and Gateshead Waterworks Act 1938; Newcastle and Gateshead Waterworks Act 1940; Newcastle and Gateshead Water Order 1956; Newcastle and Gateshead Water Order 1957; Newcastle and Gateshead Water Order 1958; Newcastle and Gateshead Water (Consolidation etc.) Order 1982

Status: Partially repealed

The company submitted a bill to Parliament for the new works, which was amended due to opposition from Newcastle Council, but the Newcastle and Gateshead Waterworks Act 1863 (26 & 27 Vict. c. xxxiv) received royal assent on 11 May 1863. The name of the company was changed to the Newcastle and Gateshead Water Company, its working capital was increased by £100,000, and authorised works included Hallington reservoir, two aqueducts which fed it, and pipelines from Newburn to Newcastle. The company was only required to supply water to homes which were situated below 380 feet (120 m) above sea level. The right of the corporation to buy the works was reiterated, but only if they obtained the necessary act of Parliament before 2 June 1864, as enshrined in the Whittle Dean Waterworks Act 1854. While the bill was in Parliament, two of the directors, Sanderson and Tone, looked at whether pumping water from the North Tyne was an alternative to the Hallington reservoir, and found that costs would be similar. However, this avenue was not pursued at the time, although it was subsequently adopted in 1940.

Newcastle and Gateshead Waterworks Act 1866
- Act of Parliament
- Parliament of the United Kingdom
- Long title: An Act to authorize the Newcastle and Gateshead Water Company to construct additional Works; to extend the Time limited for completing and purchasing the Lands for certain Works; to amend the Act relating to the Company; and for other Purposes.
- Citation: 29 & 30 Vict. c. xlix
- Territorial extent: United Kingdom

Dates
- Royal assent: 18 May 1866
- Commencement: 18 May 1866
- Repealed: 16 December 1982
Other legislation
Amends	Newcastle and Gateshead Waterworks Act 1863
Amended by	Newcastle and Gateshead Waterworks Act 1922; Newcastle and Gateshead Water Order 1956; Newcastle and Gateshead Water Order 1958
Repealed by	Newcastle and Gateshead Water (Consolidation etc.) Order 1982

Status: Repealed

There was a dispute between the company and Bateman soon afterwards. The company thought his charges were too high, while Bateman was unhappy with the quality of the workmanship at Benwell filters and on the pipeline. He wished not to be associated with such shoddy work, but some agreement was reached, and Bateman was appointed as Consulting Engineer for future works. With 1864 and 1865 being very dry years, larger engines were installed at Newburn. Work on Hallington reservoir did not start immediately, and another act of Parliament, the Newcastle and Gateshead Waterworks Act 1866 (29 & 30 Vict. c. xlix), was obtained in 1866, extending the time allowed to build it, and authorising a new aqueduct from Whittle Dean to Benwell via Throckley. Bateman oversaw the reservoir construction between 1868 and 1872. He subsequently designed filters at Throckley, a second reservoir at Hallington, a reservoir on the Swinburn and a service reservoir at Carr Hill.

Water and gas was carried between Newcastle and Gateshead by pipelines on the Tyne Bridge. In 1864 the Tyne Commissioners notified the company that they would be replacing the bridge with a swing bridge, and offered £10,000 to the company in compensation for the loss of the crossing. Both pipelines were routed over a temporary wooden bridge while the new bridge was being built, but both companies invested in a project to build Redheugh Bridge further upstream, and when it opened in 1871, it carried both services. The pumping station in Gateshead was moved to a new site at Rabbit Banks on Askew Road, nearer to the new river crossing, and a second-hand 60-inch (150 cm) beam engine was bought from the Manchester and Salford Water Company.

1874 was another year of drought, and the quantity and quality of the water supplied by the company again came under scrutiny. Robert Sterling Newall propounded a scheme to bring water 78 miles (126 km) from Ullswater in the Lake District to Whittle Dean by gravity. There was considerable support in the press for this scheme, although the Daily Chronicle favoured a scheme to use the Northumberland Lakes, proposed by Thomas John Bewick. The River Coquet was also proposed as a potential source. There was significant support for taking over the water company in Newcastle Council Meetings were held in Gateshead, at which it was suggested that water could be obtained from the Sunderland and South Shields Water Company instead. The discussions subsided a little with the coming of rain at the end of the year, although Newcastle Council passed a motion to take over the company in February 1875. Terms were nearly agreed, but the cost to the Corporation led to the decision being dropped in early 1876.

Newcastle and Gateshead Waterworks Act 1876 (Note: Section 1.)
- Act of Parliament
- Parliament of the United Kingdom
- Long title: An Act to enable the Newcastle and Gateshead Water Company to construct additional works and raise additional capital; and for other purposes.
- Citation: 39 & 40 Vict. c. cxcii
- Territorial extent: United Kingdom

Dates
- Royal assent: 24 July 1876
- Commencement: 24 July 1876
Other legislation
Amends	Newcastle and Gateshead Waterworks Act 1863
Amended by	Newcastle and Gateshead Waterworks Act 1889; Newcastle and Gateshead Waterworks Act 1938; Newcastle and Gateshead Water Order 1956; Newcastle and Gateshead Water Order 1958; Newcastle and Gateshead Water (Consolidation etc.) Order 1982

Status: Partially repealed

Text of statute as originally enacted

Two reservoirs were built on the Swinburn, known as Little Swinburn and Colt Crag. The contract for construction was awarded to Rigby of Worksop and work began in 1878. There were problems with leakage, but the company ignored Bateman's proposal to concrete over fissures in the Dry Burn, and used direct labour to make the repairs. There were also problems with movement of the embankment, and the Carr Hill service reservoir suffered from the same issue. Throckley filters were also affected by movement, and when one filter wall failed, it was blamed on poor workmanship. Direct labour was again used to fix the faults, and when West Hallington reservoir was built, this principle was extended, with Forster, the company's Resident Engineer, overseeing the work. Colt Crag reservoir remained problematic for some 20 years, and Bateman ceased to be the Consulting Engineer for the company after 1884. The construction of a second reservoir at Hallington, authorised by the Newcastle and Gateshead Waterworks Act 1876 (39 & 40 Vict. c. cxcii), began in 1884. There were delays, caused by slippage of the dams, bad weather in the winters of 1886 and 1887, and a spring beneath an embankment, but by May 1889 work was sufficiently complete that the reservoir started to fill.

Newcastle and Gateshead Waterworks Act 1889 (Note: Section 1.)
- Act of Parliament
- Parliament of the United Kingdom
- Long title: An Act for the granting of further powers to the Newcastle and Gateshead Water Company; and for other purposes.
- Citation: 52 & 53 Vict. c. xxxvi
- Territorial extent: United Kingdom

Dates
- Royal assent: 24 June 1889
- Commencement: 24 June 1889
Other legislation
Amends	Newcastle and Gateshead Waterworks Act 1863; Newcastle and Gateshead Waterworks Act 1870; Newcastle and Gateshead Waterworks Act 1876
Amended by	Newcastle and Gateshead Waterworks Act 1890; Newcastle and Gateshead Water Act 1894; Newcastle and Gateshead Water Order 1956; Newcastle and Gateshead Water Order 1958; Newcastle and Gateshead Water (Consolidation etc.) Order 1982

Status: Partially repealed

Text of statute as originally enacted

With the number of customers supplied expected to reach 500,000 by 1908, and the volume of water required by then expected to be 20 million imperial gallons (91 Ml), Thomas Hawksley was asked to look at new sources in 1888. His report favoured using water from the River Rede and constructing a reservoir at Catcleugh. A 30-inch (760 mm) diameter pipeline would carry water from there to Hallington. Despite considerable opposition, the Newcastle and Gateshead Waterworks Act 1889 (52 & 53 Vict. c. xxxvi) was obtained in June 1889.

== Bibliography ==
- Binnie, G M (1981). Early Victorian Water Engineers. Thomas Telford. ISBN 978-0-7277-0128-2.
- Cross-Rudkin, Peter; Chrimes, Mike (2008). A Biographical Dictionary of Civil Engineers in Great Britain and Ireland: Vol 2: 1830 to 1890. Thomas Telford. ISBN 978-0-7277-3504-1.
- Rennison, Robert William (1979). Water to Tyneside. Newcastle and Gateshead Water Company. ISBN 978-0-9506547-0-6.
- Skempton, Sir Alec; et al. (2002). A Biographical Dictionary of Civil Engineers in Great Britain and Ireland: Vol 1: 1500 to 1830. Thomas Telford. ISBN 978-0-7277-2939-2.
