= Scaling, North Yorkshire =

Village in North Yorkshire, England

Coordinates: 54.510°N 0.852°W

Scaling
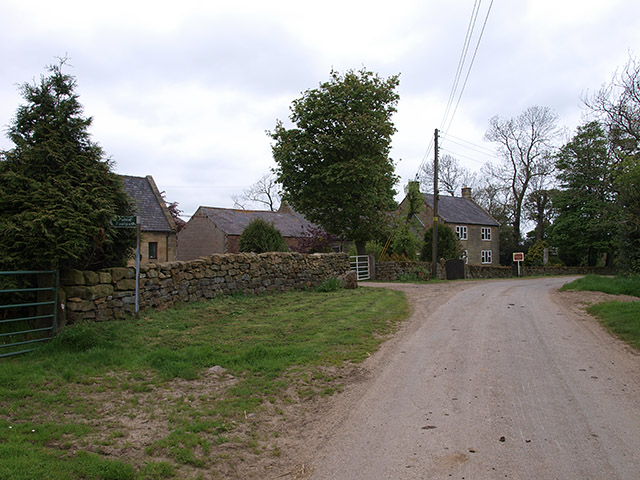
- Scaling village

- Location within North Yorkshire
- OS grid reference: NZ7413
- Unitary authority: Redcar and Cleveland
- Ceremonial county: North Yorkshire
- Region: North East
- Country: England
- Sovereign state: United Kingdom
- Police: Cleveland
- Fire: Cleveland
- Ambulance: North East

Scaling is a village in the borough of Redcar and Cleveland and the ceremonial county of North Yorkshire, England. The name of Scaling is first recorded in 1243 as Scalingis, and it is thought to be derived from Old Norse meaning a shieling, or pastureland. Although not specifically mentioned, John Christopher Atkinson theorised that Scaling was one of the unknown settlements mentioned as part of the parish of Hinderwell in the Domesday Book.

Most of the village lies within the unitary authority of Redcar and Cleveland, and the civil parish of Loftus, however, the eastern side of the settlement is in North Yorkshire and the civil parish of Roxby. Population statistics are included within the 2011 census report for Loftus. The village is just north of the A171 road where it passes Scaling Dam Reservoir.
