= Whittle Dene =

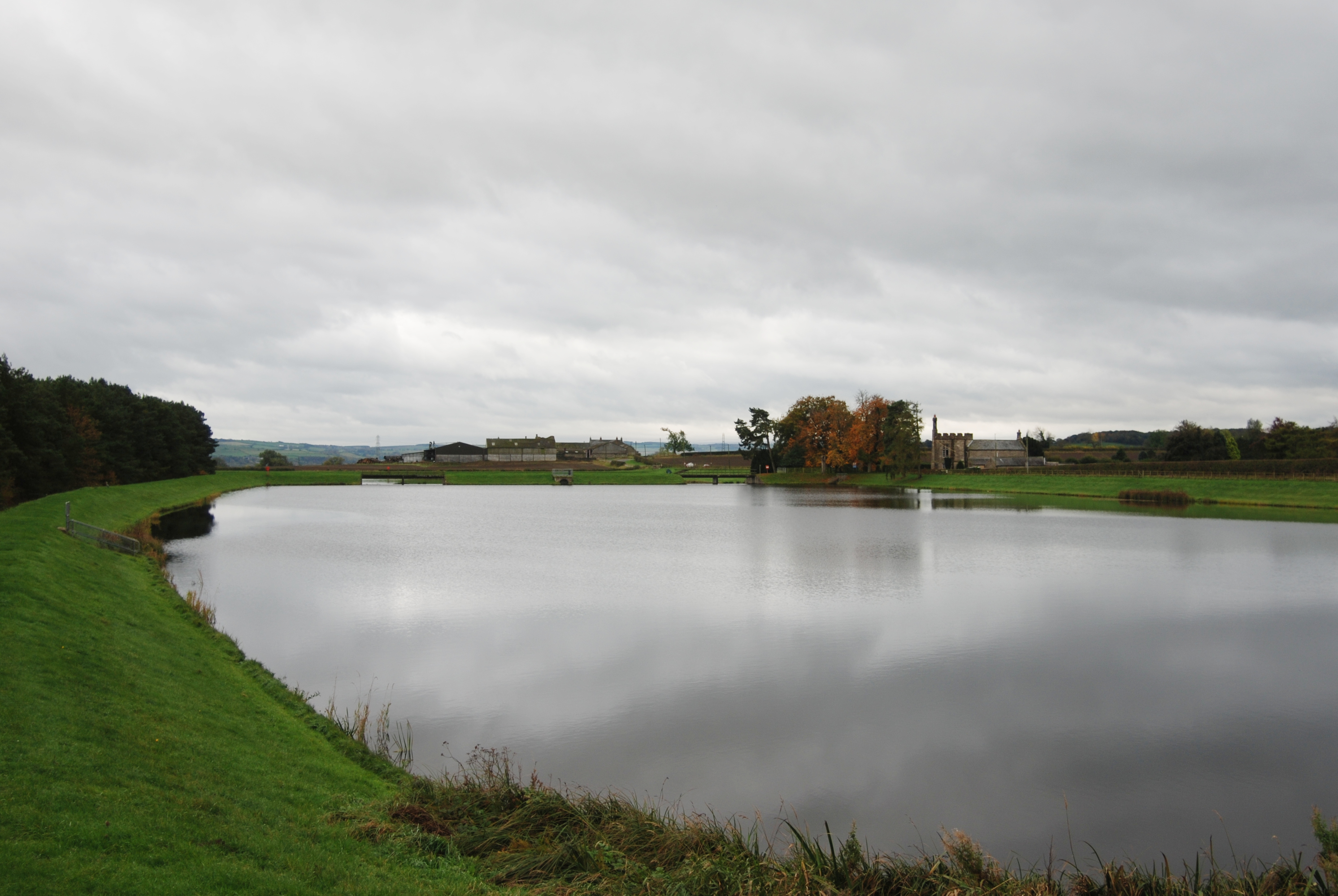
- Whittle Dene middle reservoir

- Location in Northumberland
- Location: Northumberland, England, UK
- Coordinates: 55.009°N 1.900°W grid reference NZ064682
- Type: reservoir
- Basin countries: United Kingdom

Whittle Dene is 12 miles (19 km) west of Newcastle upon Tyne, England, straddling the B6318 Military Road, and is a complex of reservoirs and treatment works forming the last stage in the supply of drinking water to Newcastle upon Tyne and Gateshead.

== History ==
A major need for piped water within Newcastle was for fire-fighting, and it was a local insurance company, the Newcastle Fire Office, which provided some of the earliest water supply points. The fire office obtained much of its water from flooded colliery workings in the Coxlodge area, the water being pumped out by a windmill and run via a brick conduit to a reservoir on the Town Moor. Better-planned proposals led to the Whittle Dean Water Company being established in 1845. Reservoirs were planned at Whittle Dene above the village of Ovingham. These reservoirs, completed in 1848, at last gave Newcastle and Gateshead a steady, clean and regular supply of water. At this point the major works of the new company were completed and later described as "the greatest step with reference to the hydraulic supply of a Town that has been taken in the Kingdom". Following those early beginnings the Newcastle and Gateshead Water Company came into being, gradually extending its area of supply and increasing its supply points.

The complex forms part of a series of reservoirs along the A68 which are connected by tunnels and aqueducts from Catcleugh Reservoir to Whittle Dene; from where drinking water is supplied to Newcastle upon Tyne, Gateshead, and some surrounding areas. The reservoirs that form the chain are, from northwest to southeast: Catcleugh Reservoir → Colt Crag Reservoir → Little Swinburne Reservoir → Hallington Reservoirs → Whittle Dene.

== Buildings ==
The reservoir keeper's house at Whittle Dene was designed by John Dobson.

== Flora and fauna ==
There are a huge variety of habitats including conifer and mixed plantations, neutral grassland and marshy grassland. The whole complex is designated as a Local Wildlife Site due to its importance for wildlife. By the end of March, the first sand martins can usually be seen over the reservoirs and summer visitors continue to increase throughout April and May when large numbers of swallows and swifts gather to feed on the insects around the site. Breeding birds usually include great crested grebe and tufted duck. A floating raft, installed on the Great Northern Reservoir in 2008, is designed to attract nesting terns. The presence of both fish and freshwater mussels mean that the site is frequented by otter.
