= Audenshaw Reservoirs =

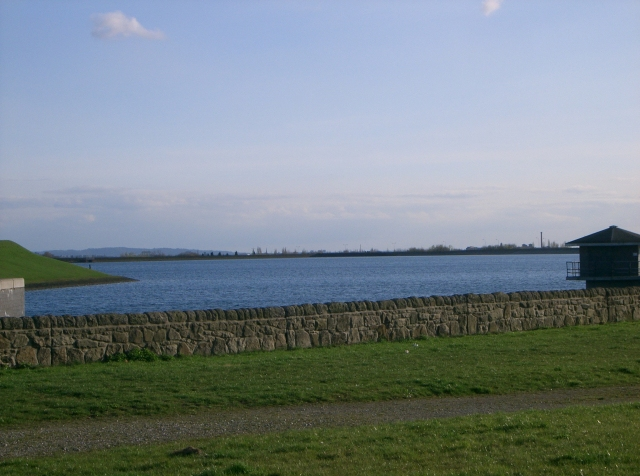
- Interactive map of Audenshaw Reservoirs
- Location: Between Audenshaw and Denton, Greater Manchester, England
- Coordinates: 53°28′50″N 2°07′14″W
- Type: Reservoirs
- Basin countries: United Kingdom
- Surface area: 101.5 ha (251 acres)
- Water volume: 5,500 cubic metres (1,200,000 imp gal) (original)

The Audenshaw Reservoirs were constructed between 1877 and 1882 by Manchester Corporation. They are located between Audenshaw and Denton, in Greater Manchester, England. Their construction was overseen by John Frederick Bateman. Part of the village of Audenshaw was demolished to make way for the three reservoirs. Also destroyed to allow their construction was a section of Nico Ditch.

== Description ==
The three reservoirs – Audenshaw No.1, Audenshaw No. 2, and Audenshaw No. 3 – originally covered an area of 101.5 hectares (251 acres), and had a total capacity of 5,500 cubic metres (1,200,000 imp gal). Reservoir number 3 was partly filled in during the 1990s, to make way for the M60 motorway.

The reservoirs are currently maintained by United Utilities plc and are not open to the general public. However, it is possible to obtain a permit to visit the reservoirs for leisure use. More recently, the reservoirs have been fenced off to the public, in preparation for the creation of a sailing club on the water.

== See also ==
- List of reservoirs and dams in the United Kingdom
