= Scaling Dam Reservoir =

Reservoir in North Yorkshire, England

- Scaling Reservoir
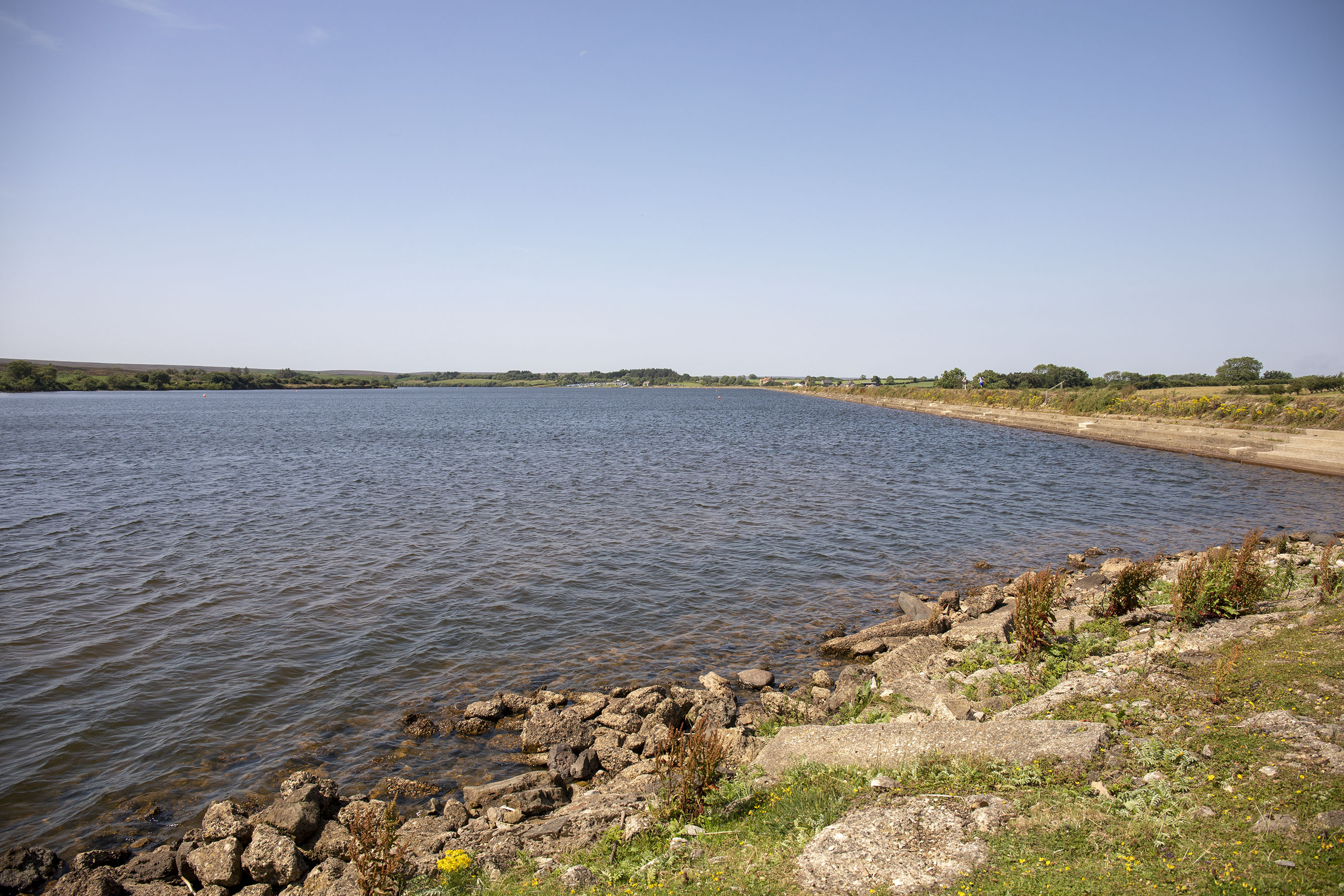
- Scaling Dam Reservoir from the east

- Location within North Yorkshire
- Location: Scaling, North Yorkshire
- Coordinates: 54.5038°N 0.8508°W
- Type: Reservoir
- Primary outflows: Dam Beck; Roxby Beck; Staithes Beck
- Catchment area: 1,510 acres (612 hectares)
- First flooded: 1958
- Surface area: 100 acres (41 hectares)
- Average depth: 12 feet (3.6 m)
- Water volume: 51,275,600 cubic feet (1,451,962 m^{3})
- Shore length^{1}: 2.5 miles (4 km)
- Surface elevation: 607 feet (185 m)
- ^{1} Shore length is not a well-defined measure.

Scaling Dam Reservoir is a freshwater man-made lake on the edge of the A171 road in North Yorkshire, England. The reservoir is near to the hamlet of Scaling from where it derives its name, and was built in 1958.

The reservoir lies inside the North York Moors National Park and the western half is in the Borough of Redcar and Cleveland, whilst the eastern half is in the Borough of Scarborough.

== History ==
Scaling Dam Reservoir was built between 1952 and 1958 at a cost of £450,000 and is the largest lake in the North York Moors. The area that the reservoir is built in was named Scaling Dam long before the reservoir was built in 1958; mapping and records show a hamlet of Scaling Dam in the early nineteenth century, and the name is mentioned in Camden's 17th century "Britannia". The dam was constructed by the Tees Valley and Cleveland Water Company and despite being in North Yorkshire (though its on the border between Redcar and Cleveland and the Borough of Scarborough), the dam is owned and regulated by Northumbrian Water. However, fresh water from the dam was historically supplied to Yorkshire Water, though this practice stopped in 2012.

Unusually, the dam wall is long, running along the width of the reservoir on the northern side. Dam walls are usually narrow against the water that they hold back. As such the deepest point, near the dam wall, is only 30 feet (9 m).

Water leaving the dam exits as Dam Beck, which on its 3.7-mile (6 km) journey to the North Sea via the fishing village of Staithes, changes to Roxby Beck, Easington Beck and then finally Staithes Beck.

== Recreational uses ==
As the Environment Agency classify the water quality as being good, Scaling Dam Reservoir is a suitable venue for angling, walking and swimming. The dam also is home to the Scaling Dam Sailing Club. There is a visitor centre and shop which sells angling supplies and parts of the reservoir are accessible for disabled anglers.

== Wildlife ==
Besides the fish (which have been introduced for angling), the site is noted for a regular appearance of ospreys during the spring and summer months, and the Nathusius' pipistrelle bat. As Scaling Dam is located close to the North Sea coast, it is an attractive site for migratory birds during the winter months, when human activity on the dam is not allowed.

The western edge of the reservoir is also the site of a nature reserve, and whilst there is no public access, people can walk around the edges of the reserve and the reservoir.
