= Colt Crag Reservoir =

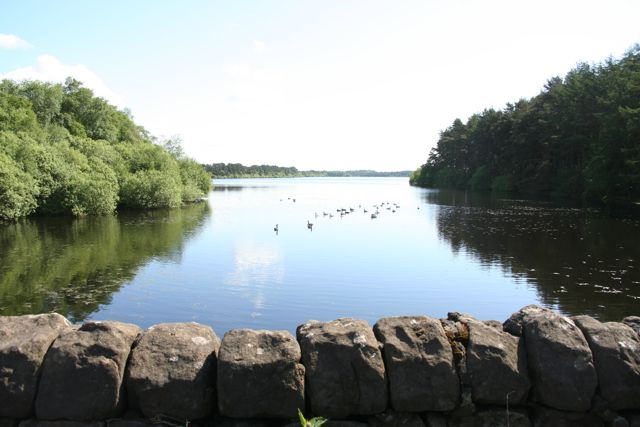
- Colt Crag Reservoir

- Location within Northumberland
- Location: Northumberland, England, UK
- Coordinates: 55.098°N 2.103°W
- Type: Reservoir
- Basin countries: England

Colt Crag Reservoir is a relatively shallow reservoir in Northumberland, England adjacent to the A68 road, and 9 miles (14 km) north of Corbridge. The A68 road at this point runs along the course of Dere Street, a Roman road.

== History ==
The reservoir was built at the end of the 19th century for the Newcastle and Gateshead Water Company. The reservoir forms part of a series of reservoirs along the A68 which are connected by tunnels and aqueducts from Catcleugh Reservoir to Whittle Dene; from where drinking water is supplied to Newcastle upon Tyne, Gateshead, and some surrounding areas. The reservoirs that form the chain are, from northwest to southeast: Catcleugh Reservoir → Colt Crag Reservoir → Little Swinburne Reservoir → Hallington Reservoirs → Whittle Dene.

== Flora and fauna ==
Much of the reservoir is fringed by mature coniferous plantation, although birch and beech also grow here with bramble and raspberry providing much of the field layer.

One of Colt Crag's main attractions are the great crested grebes, and there is also a colony of 20-30 pairs of house martins that return each year to nest under the eaves of the boathouse. The rough grassland adjacent to the site provides ideal breeding habitat for the cuckoo, meadow pipit, whinchat, and wheatear.

Badgers are known to use the site during the summer months, and both pipistrelle and noctule bats may be seen feeding around the sheltered north eastern end of the reservoir.
