= Burnhope Reservoir =

Reservoir in County Durham, England

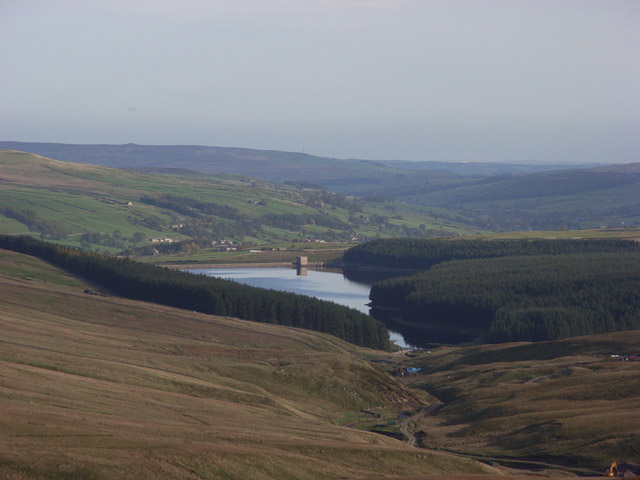
- Burnhope reservoir

- Location within County Durham
- Location: County Durham, England
- Coordinates: 54°44′40″N 2°14′40″W
- Type: reservoir
- Catchment area: 43 km^{2} (17 sq mi)
- Managing agency: Northumbrian Water
- Max. depth: 40 m (130 ft)
- Water volume: 6.4 million cubic metres (5,200 acre⋅ft)
- Surface elevation: 398 m (1,306 ft) asl

Burnhope Reservoir (/ˈbʊnəp/ BUUN-əp) is a reservoir above the village of Wearhead, County Durham, England.

The reservoir was created by the construction of an earth embankment dam across the valley of Burnhope Burn, a tributary of the River Wear, 1 kilometre (0.62 mi) above Wearhead. Construction of the dam began in 1931 and was completed in 1937; an extensive network of narrow gauge railways, the Burnhope Reservoir railway, was used during the construction of the dam. Filling of the reservoir commenced in 1936 and resulted in the drowning of the former village of Burnhope.

Burnhope Reservoir was a joint project of the Durham County Water Board and the Sunderland and South Shields Water Company. It is now owned and operated by Northumbrian Water. The reservoir supplies water to the Wear Valley treatment works at Wearhead and there is a pipeline connection to Waskerley Reservoir, which supplies Honey Hill water treatment works. The reservoir serves as the source to meet regulated discharges into the River Wear and to compensate for abstraction of water at Chester-le-Street further downstream.

== See also ==
- List of reservoirs and dams in the United Kingdom
