= Catcleugh Reservoir =

Reservoir in Northumberland, England

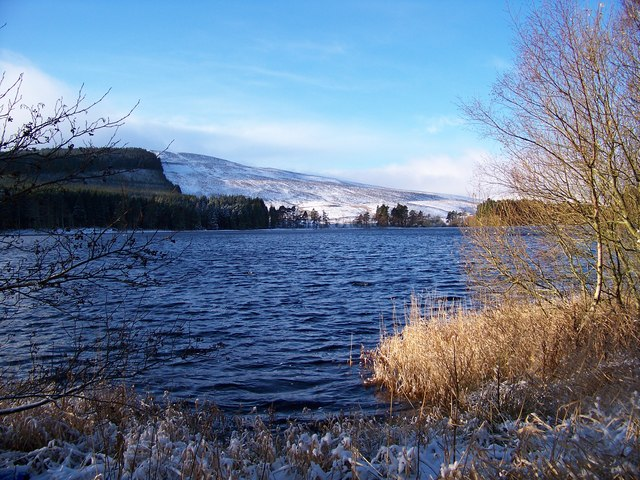
- Catcleugh Reservoir

- Location within Northumberland
- Location: Northumberland
- Coordinates: 55.324°N 2.418°W
- Type: Reservoir
- Basin countries: England

Catcleugh Reservoir is a reservoir in Northumberland, England, adjacent to the A68 road just north of Byrness and to the southeast of the border with Scotland. It has a surface area of 98.654 ha and a mean depth of 9.8 m, a catchment area of 4007.5 ha, and is situated at 247 m altitude.

== History ==
The reservoir was constructed between 1884 and 1905 for the Newcastle and Gateshead Water Company. The reservoir forms part of a series of reservoirs along the A68, which are connected by tunnels and aqueducts from Catcleugh Reservoir to Whittle Dene; from where drinking water is supplied to Newcastle upon Tyne, Gateshead, and some surrounding areas. The reservoirs that form the chain are, from northwest to southeast: Catcleugh Reservoir → Colt Crag Reservoir → Little Swinburne Reservoir → Hallington Reservoirs → Whittle Dene. The reservoir is fed by the River Rede. The steam shovel was a large factor in building this reservoir as it could easily do the work of many men.

== Flora and fauna ==
Catcleugh Reservoir has been designated as a Local Wildlife Site, and is surrounded by a mixture of native and conifer woodlands. The surrounding moorland is a Site of Special Scientific Interest because of the mosaic of heather and upland grassland. The higher moorland is home to breeding golden plover and dunlin. Ospreys are known to have used this site for roosting; buzzards are regular visitors, and there are occasional records of golden eagles.

A variety of mammals occur here including otter, red squirrel, badger, roe deer, and bat. Red squirrels live in the conifer plantations around the reservoir where mature trees provide a good supply of seeds. The young and mature conifer plantations are also a good habitat for roe deer whilst the network of watercourses provides excellent habitat for the otter.
