= List of lakes of England =

This is a list of lakes and reservoirs in England that are over 5 ha (12 acres).

== Lakes and reservoirs over 5 km^{2} ==
	Lake	Area (km^{2})	Area (sq mi)
1	Windermere	14.73	5.69
2	Rutland Water	10.86	4.19
3	Kielder Water	10.00	3.86
4	Ullswater	8.91	3.44
5	Grafham Water	6.27	2.42
6	Bassenthwaite Lake	5.34	2.06
7	Derwent Water	5.34	2.06

== Lakes larger than 5 hectares ==
This list is restricted to open bodies of fresh-water over 5 ha in area, because of the difficulty in establishing what is a pond and what is a lake.

It excludes service reservoirs used within the water supply network for the storage of drinking water and excludes water bodies on industrial sites used exclusively for industrial purposes (works ponds).

=== A ===
- Abberton Reservoir – Essex
- Agden Reservoir – South Yorkshire
- Aldenham Reservoir – Hertfordshire
- Alderfen Broad – Norfolk
- Anglezarke Reservoir – Lancashire
- Angram Reservoir – North Yorkshire
- Aqualate mere – Staffordshire/Shropshire
- Ardingly Reservoir – West Sussex
- Ardleigh Reservoir – Essex
- Argal and College Reservoirs – Cornwall
- Arnfield Reservoir – Derbyshire
- Arrow Valley Lake – Worcestershire
- Ashford Reservoir – Somerset
- Ashworth Moor Reservoir – Lancashire
- Audenshaw Reservoirs – Greater Manchester
- Avon Dam Reservoir – Devon

=== B ===
- Baitings Reservoir – West Yorkshire
- Bakethin Reservoir – Northumberland
- Balderhead Reservoir – County Durham
- Banbury Reservoir – Greater London
- Barrow Gurney Tanks – Somerset
- Bartley Reservoir – West Midlands
- Barton Broad – Norfolk
- Bassenthwaite Lake – Cumbria
- Beaver Dyke Reservoirs – West Yorkshire
- Belaugh Broad – Norfolk
- Belmont Reservoir – Lancashire
- Belvide Reservoir – Staffordshire
- Benacre Broad – Suffolk
- Besom Hill Reservoir – Greater Manchester
- Bessborough Reservoir – Surrey
- Bewl Water – Kent/East Sussex
- Bittell Reservoirs (Upper and Lower) – Worcestershire
- Black Moss Reservoirs – Greater Manchester
- Blackbrook Reservoir – Leicestershire
- Blackmoorfoot Reservoir – West Yorkshire
- Blackstone Edge Reservoir – Greater Manchester
- Blackton Reservoir – County Durham
- Blagdon Lake – Somerset
- Blithfield Reservoir – Staffordshire
- Boddington Reservoir – Northamptonshire
- Bolton Reservoir – Greater Manchester
- Bomere Pool – Shropshire
- Booth Wood Reservoir – West Yorkshire
- Borrans Reservoir – Cumbria
- Boscathnoe Reservoir – Cornwall
- Bosley Reservoir – Cheshire
- Bottoms Reservoir – Derbyshire
- Bough Beech Reservoir – Kent
- Brent Reservoir (also known as the Welsh Harp) – Greater London
- Bridge Broad – Norfolk
- Broad Fen – Norfolk
- Broadstone Reservoir – South Yorkshire
- Brookvale Park Lake – West Midlands
- Broomhead Reservoir – South Yorkshire
- Brownhouse Wham Reservoir – Lancashire
- Brundall Broad – Norfolk
- Brushes Clough Reservoir – Greater Manchester
- Brushes Reservoir – Greater Manchester
- Burnhope Reservoir – County Durham
- Burnt Fen Broad – Norfolk
- Burrator Reservoir – Devon
- Bussow Reservoir – Cornwall
- Buttermere – Cumbria

=== C ===
- Calf Hey Reservoir – Lancashire
- Calthorpe Broad – Norfolk
- Canvey Lake – Essex
- Cargenwen Reservoir – Cornwall
- Carleton Broad – Norfolk
- Carr Mill Dam – Merseyside
- Carsington Reservoir – Derbyshire
- Castleshaw Reservoir – Greater Manchester
- Catcleugh Reservoir – Northumberland
- Catfield Broad – Norfolk
- Caversham Lakes – Berkshire
- Challacombe Reservoir – Devon
- Chapelhouse Reservoir – Cumbria
- Chard Reservoir – Somerset
- Chasewater – Staffordshire
- Cheddar Reservoir – Somerset
- Chelburn Reservoir – Greater Manchester
- Chelker Reservoir – North Yorkshire
- Chelmarsh Reservoir – Shropshire
- Chew Reservoir – Greater Manchester
- Chew Valley Lake – Somerset
- Chigborough Mere – Heybridge
- Clattercote Reservoir – Oxfordshire
- Clatworthy Reservoir – Somerset
- Cockshoot Broad – Norfolk
- Cod Beck Reservoir – North Yorkshire
- Colemere – Shropshire
- Colliford Lake – Cornwall
- Colt Crag Reservoir – Northumberland
- Coniston Water – Cumbria
- Covehithe Broad – Suffolk
- Covenham Reservoir – Lincolnshire
- Cow Green Reservoir – Cumbria
- Cowm Reservoir – Lancashire
- Cransley Reservoir – Northamptonshire
- Crome's Broad – Norfolk
- Crook Gate Reservoir – Greater Manchester
- Cropston Reservoir – Leicestershire
- Crowdy Reservoir – Cornwall
- Crummock Water – Cumbria

=== D ===
- Dale Dyke Reservoir – South Yorkshire
- Damflask Reservoir – South Yorkshire
- Darracott Reservoir – Devon
- Darwell Reservoir – East Sussex
- Daventry Country Park reservoir – Northamptonshire
- Decoy Broad – Norfolk
- Delph Reservoir – Lancashire
- Denton Reservoirs – Greater Manchester
- Derwent Reservoir – Derbyshire
- Derwent Reservoir – County Durham
- Derwent Water – Cumbria
- Devoke Water – Cumbria
- Diggle Reservoir – Greater Manchester
- Dilham Broad – Norfolk
- Dingle Reservoir – Lancashire
- Dorney Lake – Buckinghamshire
- Dovestones Reservoir – Greater Manchester
- Dowdeswell Reservoir – Gloucestershire
- Dowry Reservoir – Greater Manchester
- Dozmary Pool – Cornwall
- Draycote Water – Warwickshire
- Drayton Reservoir – Northamptonshire
- Drift Reservoir – Cornwall
- Dubbs Reservoir – Cumbria
- Durleigh reservoir – Somerset

=== E ===
- Earlswood Lakes – Warwickshire
- East Warwick Reservoir – Greater London
- Easton Broad – Suffolk
- Eccup Reservoir – West Yorkshire
- Edgbaston Reservoir – West Midlands
- Elsecar Reservoir – South Yorkshire
- Elslack Reservoir – North Yorkshire
- Embsay Reservoir – North Yorkshire
- Emborough Pond – Somerset
- Ennerdale Water – Cumbria
- Errwood Reservoir – Derbyshire
- Esthwaite Water – Cumbria
- Eyebrook Reservoir – Leicestershire/Rutland

=== F ===
- Farmoor Reservoir – Oxfordshire
- Fernilee Reservoir – Derbyshire
- Fernworthy Reservoir – Devon
- Fewston Reservoir – Yorkshire
- Filby Broad – Norfolk
- Fisher Tarn – Cumbria
- Fleet Pond – Hampshire
- Fontburn Reservoir – Northumberland
- Fonthill Lake – Wiltshire
- Fountains Fell Tarn – Yorkshire
- Foxcote Reservoir – Buckinghamshire
- Frankley Reservoir – West Midlands

=== G ===
- Gadwall Lake – Heybridge
- Gailey Reservoir – Staffordshire
- Gammaton Reservoirs – Devon
- Gormire Lake – North Yorkshire
- Gorton Reservoirs – Greater Manchester
- Gouthwaite Reservoir – North Yorkshire
- Grafham Water – Cambridgeshire
- Grasmere – Cumbria
- Grassholme Reservoir – County Durham
- Green Withens Reservoir – West Yorkshire
- Greenbooth Reservoir – Greater Manchester
- Greenfield Reservoir – Greater Manchester
- Grimwith Reservoir – North Yorkshire

=== H ===
- H's Lake – Great Totham
- Hallington Reservoirs – Northumberland
- Hamer Pasture Reservoir – Greater Manchester
- Hanch Reservoir – Staffordshire
- Hanging Lees Reservoir – Greater Manchester
- Hanningfield Reservoir – Essex
- Hardley Flood – Norfolk
- Harlock Reservoir – Cumbria
- Hatherton Reservoir – Staffordshire
- Haweswater Reservoir – Cumbria
- Hawkridge Reservoir – Somerset
- Heybridge Mere – Heybridge
- Hayeswater – Cumbria
- Heaton Park Reservoir – Greater Manchester
- Hickling Broad – Norfolk
- High Maynard Reservoir – Greater London
- High Rid Reservoir – Greater Manchester
- Higher Swineshaw Reservoir – Greater Manchester
- Hisehope Reservoir – County Durham
- Holden Wood Reservoir – Lancashire
- Hollingworth Lake – Greater Manchester
- Hollowell reservoir – Northamptonshire
- Holywell Reservoir – Devon
- Home Water – Heybridge
- Hornsea Mere – East Riding of Yorkshire
- Horsey Mere – Norfolk
- Hoveton Great Broad – Norfolk
- Hoveton Little Broad – Norfolk
- Howden Reservoir – South Yorkshire
- Hurworth Burn Reservoir – County Durham
- Hury Reservoir – County Durham

=== I ===
- Ingbirchworth Reservoir – South Yorkshire
- Island Barn Reservoir – Surrey

=== J ===
- Jennetts Reservoir – Devon
- Jumbles Reservoir – Lancashire

=== K ===
- Kennick Reservoir – Devon
- Kentmere Reservoir – Cumbria
- Kielder Water – Northumberland
- Killington Reservoir – Cumbria
- King George V Reservoir – Greater London
- King George VI Reservoir – Surrey
- Kitcliffe Reservoir – Greater Manchester
- Knight Reservoir – Surrey
- Knighton Reservoir – Shropshire
- Knipton Reservoir – Leicestershire
- Knypersley Reservoir – Staffordshire

=== L ===
- Ladybower Reservoir – Derbyshire
- Lamaload Reservoir – Cheshire
- Laneshaw Reservoir – Lancashire
- Langsett Reservoir – South Yorkshire
- Leigh Reservoir – Somerset
- Leighton Reservoir – North Yorkshire
- Lifford Reservoir – West Midlands
- Light Hazzles Reservoir – Greater Manchester
- Lily Broad – Norfolk
- Lindley Wood Reservoir – North Yorkshire
- Little Swinburne Reservoir – Northumberland
- Litton Reservoirs – Somerset
- Lockwood Reservoir – Greater London
- Longdendale Chain of reservoirs – Derbyshire
- Lothing Lake – Suffolk
- Low Maynard Reservoir – Greater London
- Lower Chelburn Reservoir – Greater Manchester
- Lower Rivington Reservoir – Lancashire
- Lower Roddlesworth Reservoir – Lancashire
- Lower Swineshaw Reservoir – Greater Manchester
- Loweswater – Cumbria
- Lumley Moor Reservoir – North Yorkshire
- Luxhay Reservoir – Somerset

=== M ===
- Main Lake – Heybridge
- Malham Tarn – North Yorkshire
- Malthouse Broad – Norfolk
- Manchester, Bolton and Bury Reservoir – Greater Manchester
- March Ghyll Reservoir – Cumbria
- Martham Broad – Norfolk
- Martin Mere – Lancashire
- Marton Mere – Lancashire
- May Water – Heybridge
- Meadley Reservoir – Cumbria
- Melbury Reservoir – Devon
- Meldon Reservoir – Devon
- Midhope Reservoir – South Yorkshire
- Molesey Reservoirs – Surrey
- More Hall Reservoir – South Yorkshire
- Mossy Moor Reservoir – North Yorkshire

=== N ===
- Naden Reservoirs (Higher, Middle and Lower) – Greater Manchester
- Nanpantan Reservoir – Leicestershire
- Naseby Reservoir – Northamptonshire
- Netherton Reservoir – West Midlands
- New Years Bridge Reservoir – Greater Manchester
- Norfolk Broads – Norfolk
- Norman Hill Reservoir – Greater Manchester
- Nutscale Reservoir – Somerset

=== O ===
- Ogden Reservoir – Greater Manchester
- Ogden Reservoir (Lancashire) – Lancashire
- Ogston Reservoir – Derbyshire
- Old Ford – Greater London
- Oldbury Reservoir – Warwickshire
- Olton Reservoir – West Midlands
- Orchardleigh Lake – Somerset
- Ormesby Broad – Norfolk
- Ormesby Little Broad – Norfolk
- Oulston Reservoir – North Yorkshire
- Oulton Broad – Suffolk

=== P ===
- Packington Lakes – Warwickshire
- Pebley Reservoir – South Yorkshire
- Pennington Flash – Leigh
- Pennington Reservoir – Cumbria
- Piethorne Reservoir – Greater Manchester
- Pitsford Water – Northamptonshire
- Poaka Beck Reservoir – Cumbria
- Pochard Lake – Heybridge
- Porth Reservoir – Cornwall
- Powdermill Reservoir – East Sussex

=== Q ===
- Queen Elizabeth II Reservoir – Surrey
- Queen Mary Reservoir – Surrey
- Queen Mother Reservoir – Surrey

=== R ===
- Rake Brook Reservoir – Lancashire
- Ranworth Broad – Norfolk
- Ravensthorpe Reservoir – Northamptonshire
- Readycon Dean Reservoir – Greater Manchester
- Redbrook Reservoir – West Yorkshire
- Redmires Reservoirs – South Yorkshire
- Rhodeswood Reservoir – Derbyshire
- Ridgegate Reservoir – Cheshire
- Ringstone Edge Reservoir – West Yorkshire
- Rivelin Dams – South Yorkshire
- Roadford Lake – Devon
- Rockland Broad – Norfolk
- Rollesby Broad – Norfolk
- Rooden Reservoir – Greater Manchester
- Roundhill Reservoir – North Yorkshire
- Royd Moor Reservoir – South Yorkshire
- Rudyard Lake – Staffordshire
- Rumworth Lodge Reservoir – Greater Manchester
- Rutland Water – Rutland
- Ryburn Reservoir – West Yorkshire
- Rydal Water – Cumbria

=== S ===
- Saddington Reservoir – Leicestershire
- Salhouse Broad – Norfolk
- Sandhill Lake – Nottinghamshire
- Scammonden Reservoir – West Yorkshire
- Scar House Reservoir – North Yorkshire
- Scarborough Mere – North Yorkshire
- Scargill Reservoir – North Yorkshire
- Scout Dike Reservoir – South Yorkshire
- Selset Reservoir – County Durham
- Semerwater – North Yorkshire
- Serpentine – Greater London
- Shustoke Reservoirs – Warwickshire
- Siblyback Lake – Cornwall
- Simpson Ground Reservoir – Cumbria
- Slade Reservoir – Devon
- Smiddy Shaw Reservoir – County Durham
- Snailsden Reservoir – South Yorkshire
- Spring Mill Reservoir – Lancashire
- Springs Reservoir – Lancashire
- Stain Hill Reservoirs – Surrey
- Staines Reservoirs – Surrey
- Stanford Reservoir – Leicestershire/Northamptonshire
- Staunton Harold Reservoir – Leicestershire
- Stithians Reservoir – Cornwall
- Stoke Newington West Reservoir – Greater London
- Stowe Pool – Staffordshire
- Strines Reservoir – South Yorkshire
- Strinesdale Reservoir – Greater Manchester
- Strumpshaw Fen – Norfolk
- Sulby Reservoir (Northamptonshire) – Northamptonshire
- Sunnyside Reservoir – Surrey
- Sutton reservoir – Cheshire
- Sutton Bingham Reservoir – Somerset
- Sutton Broad – Norfolk
- Swellands Reservoir – West Yorkshire
- Swineshaw Reservoirs – Greater Manchester
- Swinsty Reservoir – North Yorkshire
- Swithland Reservoir – Leicestershire
- Sywell Reservoir – Northamptonshire

=== T ===
- Talkin Tarn – Cumbria
- Tardebigge Reservoir – Worcestershire
- Ten Acre Reservoir – North Yorkshire
- The Mere – Shropshire
- Thirlmere – Cumbria
- Thornton Reservoir – Leicestershire
- Thornton Steward Reservoir – North Yorkshire
- Thorpe Malsor reservoir – Northamptonshire
- Thrapston Sailing Lake – Northamptonshire
- Thruscross Reservoir – Yorkshire
- Tilgate Lake – West Sussex
- Tittesworth Reservoir – Staffordshire
- Torside Reservoir – Derbyshire
- Tottiford Reservoir – Devon
- Trenchford Reservoir – Devon
- Trentabank Reservoir – Cheshire
- Tring Reservoirs – Hertfordshire
- Turkey Broad – Norfolk
- Turnstall Reservoir – County Durham
- Turton and Entwistle Reservoir – Lancashire

=== U ===
- Ullswater – Cumbria
- Underbank Reservoir – South Yorkshire
- Upper Barden Reservoir – North Yorkshire
- Upper Derwent Valley – Derbyshire
- Upper Rivington Reservoir – Lancashire
- Upper Roddlesworth Reservoir – Lancashire
- Upton Broad – Norfolk

=== V ===
- Valehouse Reservoir – Derbyshire
- Ventford Reservoir – Devon
- Virginia Water Lake – Berkshire

=== W ===
- Walkerwood Reservoir – Greater Manchester
- Walshaw Dean Reservoirs – West Yorkshire
- Walthamstow Reservoirs – Greater London
- Warwick Reservoir – Greater London
- Waskerley Reservoir – County Durham
- Wast Water – Cumbria
- Watergrove Reservoir – Greater Manchester
- Wayoh Reservoir – Lancashire
- Weecher Reservoir – South Yorkshire
- Weir Wood Reservoir – West Sussex
- Welford Reservoir – Northamptonshire
- West Warwick Reservoir – London
- Weston Turville Reservoir – Buckinghamshire
- Wet Sleddale Reservoir – Cumbria
- Wharncliffe Reservoir – South Yorkshire
- Wheatfen Broad – Norfolk
- Whitlingham Great Broad – Norfolk
- William Girling Reservoir – Greater London
- Wilton Water – Wiltshire
- Wimbleball Lake – Somerset
- Windermere – Cumbria
- Windleden Reservoirs – South Yorkshire
- Winscar Reservoir – South Yorkshire
- Winsford flashes – Cheshire
- Winterburn Reservoir – North Yorkshire
- Wistlandpound Reservoir – Devon
- Witton Lakes – West Midlands
- Womack Water – Norfolk
- Woodhead Reservoir – Derbyshire
- Wormleighton Reservoir – Warwickshire
- Worsbrough Reservoir – South Yorkshire
- Worthington Lakes – Greater Manchester
- Wraysbury Reservoir – Surrey
- Wroxham Broad – Norfolk
- Wychall Reservoir – Birmingham

=== Y ===
- Yarrow Reservoir – Lancashire
- Yeoman Hey Reservoir – Greater Manchester

== See also ==
- List of lakes in the Lake District
- List of loughs of Ireland
- List of lochs of Scotland
- List of lakes of Wales
- List of dams and reservoirs in the United Kingdom
- List of lakes and tarns in North Yorkshire
