= Welford, Northamptonshire =

Village in Northamptonshire, England

Coordinates: 52.417°N 1.058°W

Welford
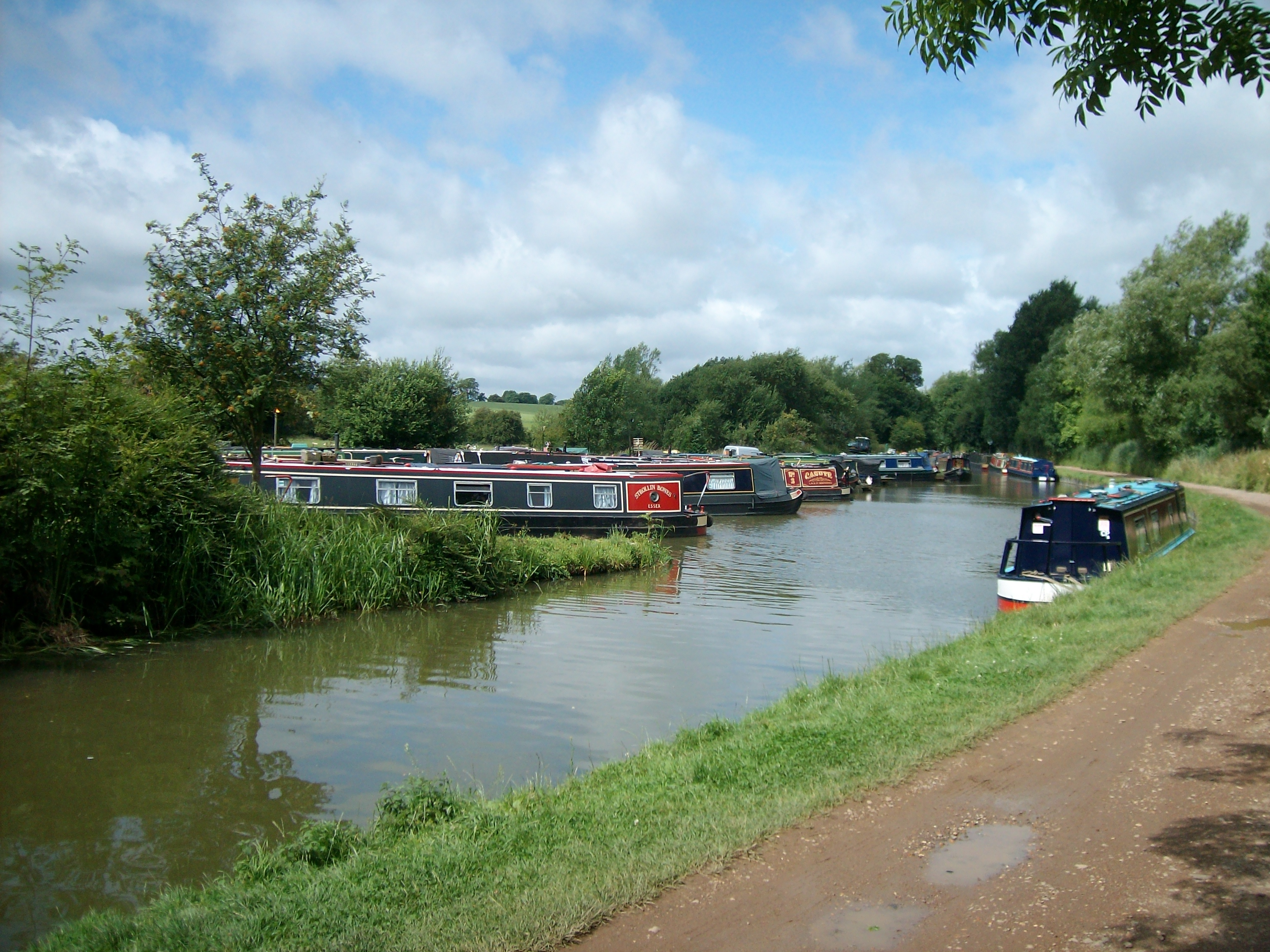
- Welford Marina

- Location within Northamptonshire
- Population: 1,043 (2011 census)
- OS grid reference: SP6480
- Civil parish: Welford
- Unitary authority: West Northamptonshire
- Ceremonial county: Northamptonshire
- Region: East Midlands
- Country: England
- Sovereign state: United Kingdom
- Post town: NORTHAMPTON
- Postcode district: NN6
- Dialling code: 01858
- Police: Northamptonshire
- Fire: Northamptonshire
- Ambulance: East Midlands
- UK Parliament: Daventry

Welford is a village and civil parish in the West Northamptonshire unitary authority area of Northamptonshire, England, just south of the River Avon and the border with Leicestershire. At the 2011 census, the population of the parish was 1,043.

== Location ==
It is on the main A5199 road connecting Northampton and Leicester and, being halfway between the two, was an important stagecoach stop. The A5199 is known as the 'Welford Road' for much of its length. It is close to the junction of the two major motor routes in England – the M1 motorway and the M6 motorway – and is 1½ miles north of Junction 1 of the A14, which connects that junction with the east of England.

== History ==
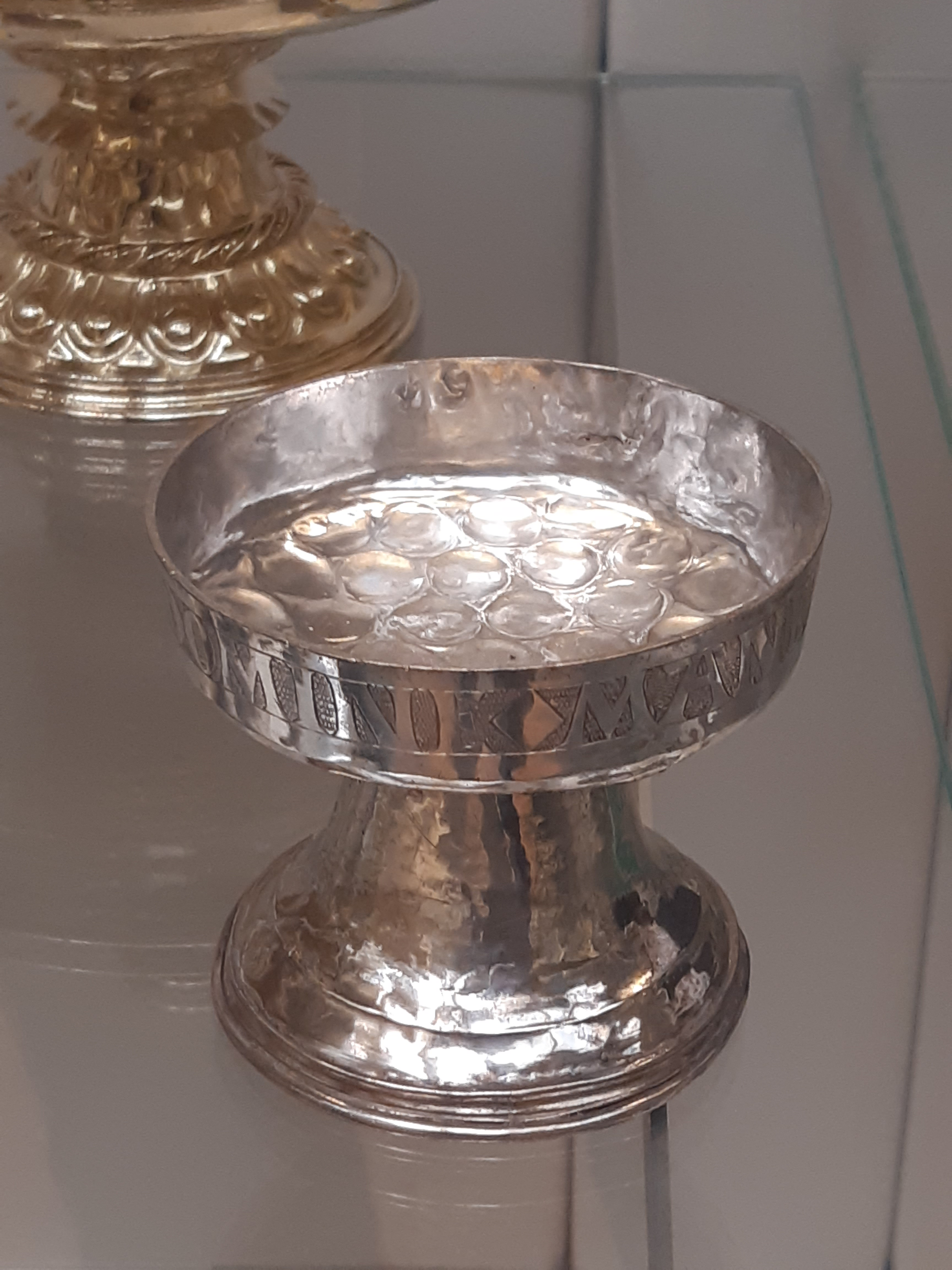
The Welford Cup in the British Museum

The village's name means 'ford with a spring/stream'.

In medieval times its Premonstratensian Abbey moved to Sulby some two miles to the east and Welford lost its market charter which was sold to West Haddon. There is clear evidence that Welford shrank considerably during the medieval period and it is notable that three of its neighbouring civil parishes – Elkington, Stanford-on-Avon and Sulby – are almost entirely depopulated.

In 2016, a new housing estate was built called Miller's Lock. While the builders were digging up the foundations, they found the remains of an Iron Age roundhouse.

A silver cup dating from the sixteenth century that was found in the village is in the British Museum.

The history of the parish has been the subject of two books:

- Welford: Portrait of a Northamptonshire Village"
- Welford: The Legacy 1856 to 1980

== Notable buildings ==
The Historic England website contains a total of 38 entries for listed buildings in the parish of Welford. These are all Grade II, apart from St Mary's Church, which is Grade II*. They include:

- St Mary's Church, Church Lane
- The Talbot, High Street
- Manor House, West Street
- Welford Congregational Church, West End

== Facilities ==
It is served by a short arm from the Grand Union Canal and has two marinas. The Jurassic Way long distance footpath passes through the village on a southwest–northeast axis; although it officially makes its way through the fields to the east of the village, many walkers prefer to walk along the High Street to make use of the village's facilities.

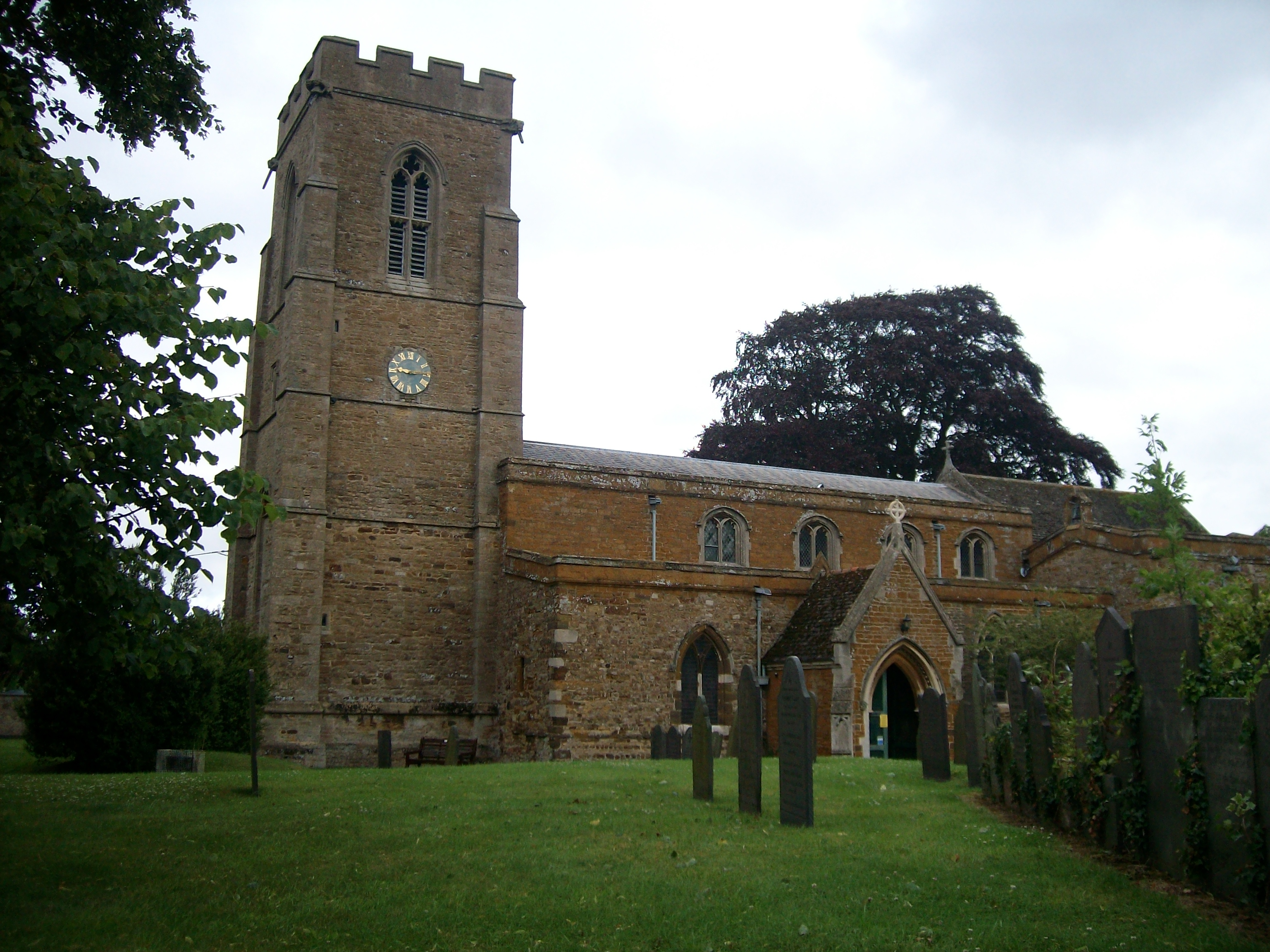
The Parish Church of St Mary the Virgin

Welford has a village shop and post office, a beauty therapy studio, a Church of England Endowed primary school, a garage, and one public house. Another public house lies just over the Leicestershire border, but is reached by walking through the Welford Pocket Park.

The primary school is part of the Peterborough Diocese Education Trust and accepts children from the surrounding parishes, giving the name Welford, Sibbertoft and Sulby Endowed School (WSSES). There are around 85 pupils at the school. WSSES is a feeder school to the secondary provision of Guilsborough Academy, in the neighbouring village of Guilsborough, Northamptonshire.

Other amenities include a village hall, a sports field which is home to Welford Victoria F.C., a youth centre and a pocket park. There is also a spinney which is near the park and was a gravel quarry in the 19th century. To the North East of the village lie Welford Reservoir and Sulby Reservoir.

A painted wood carving of Postman Pat and his black and white cat, Jess stands at the junction of High Street and West Street. It was crowd funded by villagers and installed in 2019 after the previous statues, which stood in the same spot for 25 years, rotted away.

It is now administered as part of West Northamptonshire. Previously it was in Daventry District (1974–2021) having earlier been part of Oxendon Rural District (1894–1935) followed by Brixworth Rural District (1935–74).
