= Welford Congregational Church =

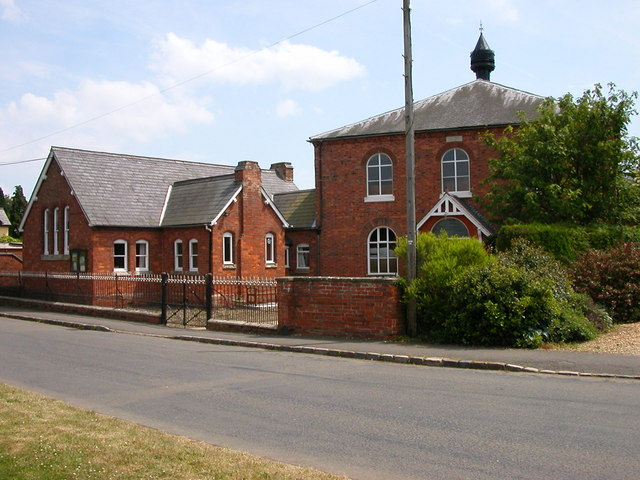
- Welford Congregational Church
- 52.4165°N 1.0607°W
- Denomination: Congregational Federation
- Website: http://www.congregational.org.uk/find-a-church/church-finder/126/welford

Welford Congregational Church is a Congregational church built in 1793 in the village of Welford, Northamptonshire. It is a Grade II listed building and stands on the east side of West End.

== History ==
A 19th-century history of the church, then referred to as Welford Independent Church, states that a dissenting congregation first met at Welford in 1674, on the premises of Mr Edmund Miles, its first minister being Rev John Shuttleworth (1632-1688). In 1698, Rev John Norris was called to be minister at Welford and two years later a meeting house capable of seating 500 hearers was opened. By 1743, when Mr King became pastor, it was reported that the congregation included people drawn from Welford and thirteen neighbouring villages. In 1793 this was replaced by the present church, which occupies a different site.

Extensive details of the history of the congregation and the buildings in which it has met appear in a chapter of "Welford: Portrait of a Northamptonshire Village".

== Building ==
The church is built of red brick, with a datestone of 1793. It contains a worship area with vestibule and gallery supported by cast iron columns at the west end. A detailed description appears on the Historic England website. A Sunday School was erected in 1866.
