= Piethorne Brook =

Stream in Greater Manchester, England

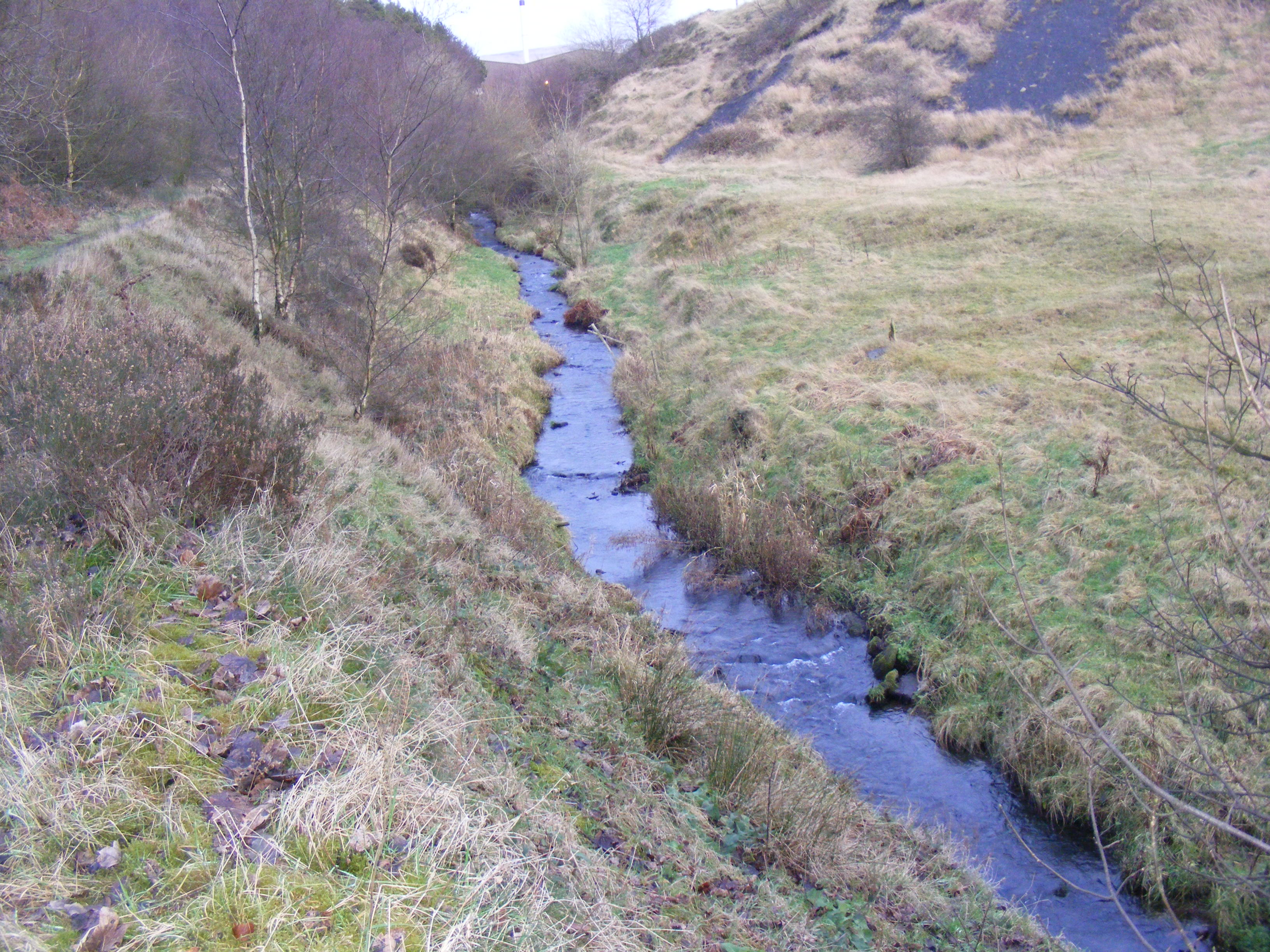
- Looking upstream to Ogden from Newhey

Location
- Country: England

Physical characteristics
- Source
  - location: Windy Hill
- Mouth
  - location: River Beal, Newhey
  - coordinates: 53°35′56.57″N 2°05′44.31″W

Piethorne Brook is a watercourse in Greater Manchester. It is a tributary of the River Beal.

== Sources ==
Piethorne Brook and its feeder streams originate on the area of high moorland at Windy Hill on the south side of the M62 motorway close to its summit near the old boundary between Lancashire and Yorkshire. The source of the brook, and its immediate feeder stream, is beside Rock Stones Hill, at 415 metres above sea level (1360 ft.), to the south west of the telecommunications mast beside the A672 Oldham-Ripponden road. The brook has ten other feeder streams including two from Axletree Edge beyond Bleakedgate Moor, which rises to 425 metres (1400 ft), two from Millstone Moss between Green Hole Hill and Readycon Hill, rising at 445 metres (1450 ft.) and flowing down Great Whinning Gulf and Little Whinning Gulf, via Culvert Clough, into Cold Greave Brook.

== Course ==
Piethorne Brook feeds and flows through a series of reservoirs constructed during the 19th century. From its source, they are Norman Hill Reservoir, Piethorne Reservoir, into which Cold Greave Brook and Tom Brook flow, Kitcliffe Reservoir, and Ogden Reservoir, into which Rag Hole Brook flows. The reservoirs and Hanging Lees Reservoir and Rooden Reservoir are in the Piethorne Valley. Below Ogden Reservoir, close to Lanebottom, the brook is joined by Wickenhall Brook. It then flows under Peppermint Bridge to Haugh Lane and is culverted under the tram line (the former railway line) to its confluence with the River Beal at Two Bridges in Newhey.

== History ==
A Celtic spearhead unearthed during excavations for Piethorne Reservoir provides evidence of habitation in the Bronze Age. Binns Farm dated from the 13th century was demolished to make way for the reservoir. Other farms including Piethorn and Norman Hill were mentioned in court documents or leases of 1606 and 1608. The ancient packhorse route, Rapes Highway (named after Rapes Hill) passed across the brook and its feeder streams. In the hamlet of Haugh near Newhey, residents were said to have panned for gold in the brook until the 19th century. The brook marked the end of the Shaw to Featherstall (Littleborough) turnpike road after funding from mill-owners in Crompton and Two Bridges was withdrawn. In 1851 the Piethorne Brook bridge on Shaw Road was shown as a wooden bridge, whereas the adjacent Beal bridge had been improved. In the 19th century, the brook was used in the creation of several reservoirs in the area including Norman Hill, Piethorne, Kitcliffe, Ogden, Rooden and Hanging Lees. The importance of the brook to the locality was recognized by the Oldham historian Edwin Butterworth, circa 1837, when he marked the brook as the River Haugh in one of his early maps of the Oldham district.

=== Name ===
One explanation of the brook's name is that "pie" is short for magpie, and "thorne" for hawthorn, both bird and bush re common in the area. The lowest mill on the brook was called Salt Pye Cotton Mill in the 19th century. The name "salt pye" is connected to the old packhorse routes and signifies a building, on or near a packhorse route, used for the distribution of salt from Cheshire.

=== Mills ===
Butterworth, writing in 1828, described the area above Newhey, where Piethorne Brook enters the River Beal; he wrote that "there are many woollen mills, supplied with numerous streams of water". The earliest woollen mills were established at farmhouses; Kitcliffe Farm had a fulling mill, powered by a wooden waterwheel, and some of the mill structure can still be seen. In the 19th century, larger mills were built below the brook's confluence with Wickenhall Brook, to use the waters for processing rather than power. The mills were Ogden Mill (bleaching and finishing), Wood Mill (fellmongering), Haugh Mill (woollen), Haugh Mill (cotton), and Salt Pye Mill (cotton waste spinning). Each mill, apart from Haugh Mill, had a reservoir or millpond fed by the brook; Ogden Mill had a reservoir and millpond. Another mill, Lower Two Bridges Mill, took water from the River Beal and also from the brook via the discharge from the Salt Pye Mill reservoir. The latter mill subsequently changed its name to Two Bridges Mill and, after 1919, to Coral Mill.

=== Reservoirs ===
Oldham Corporation began work on Piethorne Reservoir, to be fed by the brook and Cold Greave Brook, in 1858, and it was completed and filled ten years later. It was found that the brooks carried moorland silt into the reservoir and Hanging Lees Reservoir was built as a (silt) settling reservoir, and Norman Hill Reservoir as a higher reservoir. A stone-step cascade, or man-made waterfall, was built for the brook to pass from Norman Hill into Piethorne Reservoir.

Diverting the brooks' waters resulted in a significant reduction of flow into the lower brook. In consequence, and as a result of the Gas and Water Works Facilities Act 1870 (33 & 34 Vict. c. 70), Kitcliffe Reservoir and Ogden Reservoir were built below Piethorne Reservoir and Oldham Corporation Waterworks was required to discharge one million gallons a day into the brook.

== Lower tributaries ==
Rag Hole Brook, whose name derives from the Lancashire dialect word "rag", meaning hoar frost, enters Ogden Reservoir. Wickenhall Brook is the major lower tributary. Its source is in high moorland near the A640 Huddersfield Road, in Little Rochdale Parish. After passing beneath the road, it flows down a deep clough, feeds two former mill ponds, is culverted beneath the site of a former mill and print works, and is finally culverted at Lanebottom, before flowing down to join Piethorne Brook before Ogden Mill. An overflow drain arcs round to Ogden Reservoir. It falls 200 m (610 ft.) in a little over 2 km (1.3 miles).

Wickenhall Brook is named after the Lancashire dialect word "wicken", meaning rowan or mountain ash, found in its Clough at a place called Wicken Hole.

== Tributaries ==
- Haugh Brook
- Wickenhall Brook
- Rag Hole Brook (Into Ogden Reservoir)
- Tom Brook (Into Kitcliffe Reservoir)
- Cold Greave Brook
  - Little Whinning Gulf
  - Great Whinning Gulf
- Ashworth Brook
- Griffiths Brook

== Gallery ==
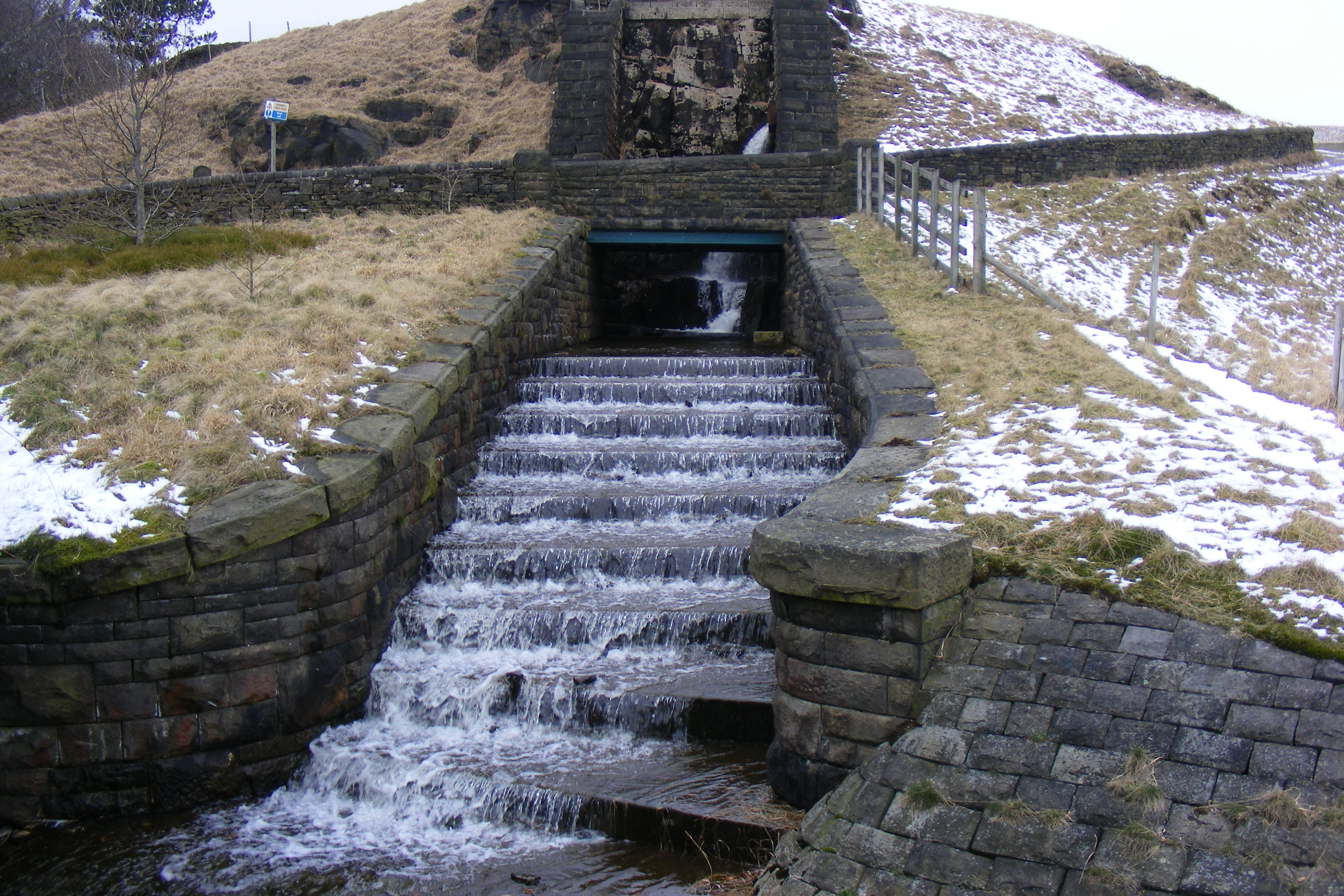
Waterfall between Norman Hill and Piethorne Reservoirs

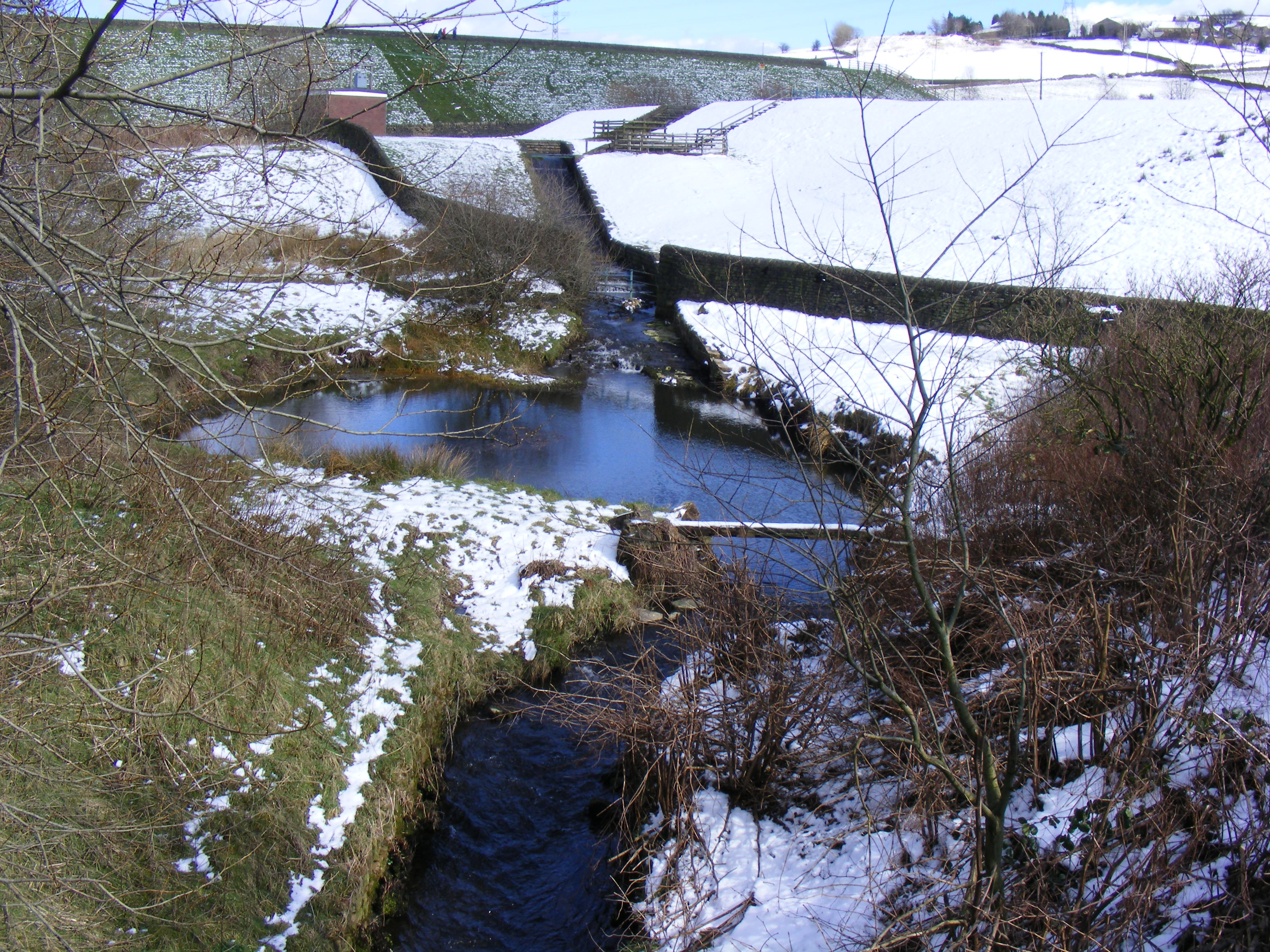
Looking upstream to Ogden Reservoir

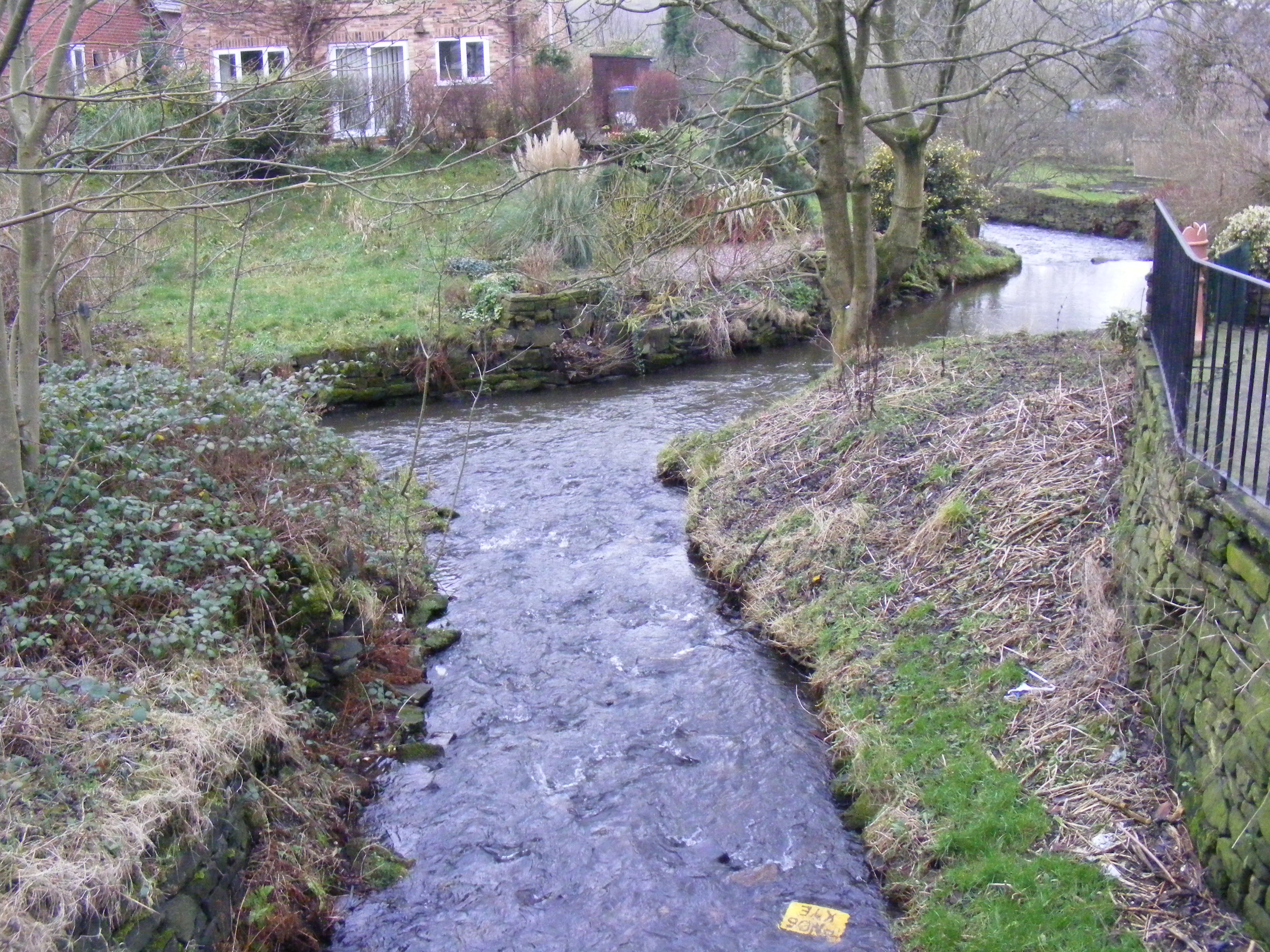
Confluence with River Beal

== See also ==
- Piethorne Reservoir
- River Beal
