= Higher Swineshaw Reservoir =

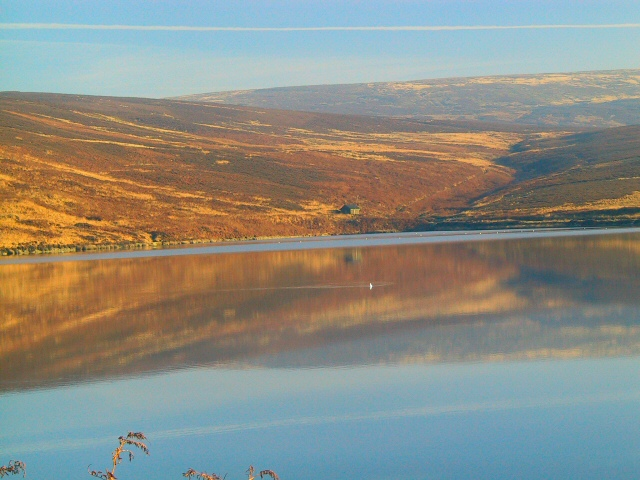
- Higher Swineshaw Reservoir and the moors

- Location within Greater Manchester
- Location: Greater Manchester
- Coordinates: 53.4930°N 1.9940°W
- Type: reservoir
- Max. depth: 53 ft (16 m)
- Water volume: 168,908,000 US gal (639,390,000 L; 140,645,000 imp gal)

Higher Swineshaw Reservoir is the highest reservoir in a series of four in the Brushes Valley above Stalybridge in Greater Manchester. It was built in the 19th century by the corporations of Ashton-under-Lyne and Stalybridge to provide a supply of safe drinking water, one of four reservoirs authorised by the Ashton-under-Lyne and Stalybridge (Corporations) Waterworks Act 1864 (27 & 28 Vict. c. xlvii). Though the reservoir and its watershed are totally in Greater Manchester it is within a mile of the Derbyshire border. It is owned and operated by United Utilities.

The reservoir dam consists of a clay core within an earth embankment. The Peak District Boundary Walk runs across the dam on the south side of the reservoir.

== Capacity ==
Brushes Valley reservoirs
Name	Depth of reservoir	Capacity of reservoir
Walkerwood Reservoir	61 ft (19 m)	202,084,000 US gal (764,970,000 L; 168,270,000 imp gal)
Brushes Reservoir	44 ft (13 m)	52,165,000 US gal (197,470,000 L; 43,436,000 imp gal)
Lower Swineshaw Reservoir	33 ft (10 m)	55,500,000 US gal (210,000,000 L; 46,200,000 imp gal)
Higher Swineshaw Reservoir	53 ft (16 m)	168,908,000 US gal (639,390,000 L; 140,645,000 imp gal)
Total	-	882,939,000 US gal (3.34229×10^{9} L; 735,201,000 imp gal)

== See also ==
- Walkerwood Reservoir
- Brushes Reservoir
- Lower Swineshaw Reservoir
