= Hanging Lees Reservoir =

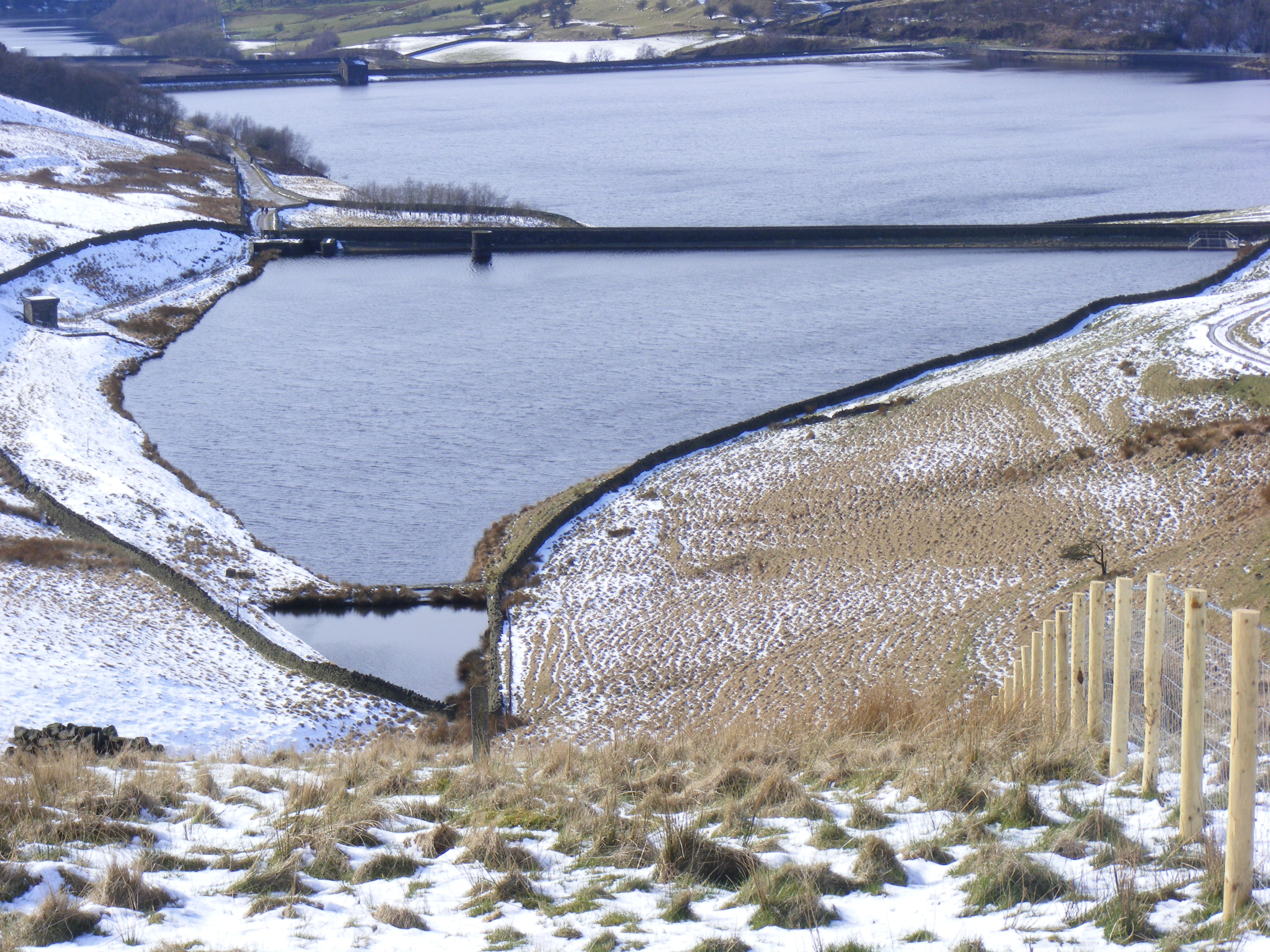

- Location within Greater Manchester
- Location: Greater Manchester
- Coordinates: 53°36′28″N 2°2′53″W
- Type: reservoir
- Basin countries: United Kingdom

Hanging Lees Reservoir is a small reservoir in the Piethorne Valley in the Metropolitan Borough of Rochdale, within Greater Manchester, England. It is situated between Rooden and Piethorne Reservoirs.

The area around the reservoir has trails for walking.

Next reservoir upstream	Piethorne Valley	Next reservoir downstream
Rooden Reservoir	Hanging Lees Reservoir; Grid reference SD96921236	Piethorne Reservoir
