= Kitcliffe Reservoir =

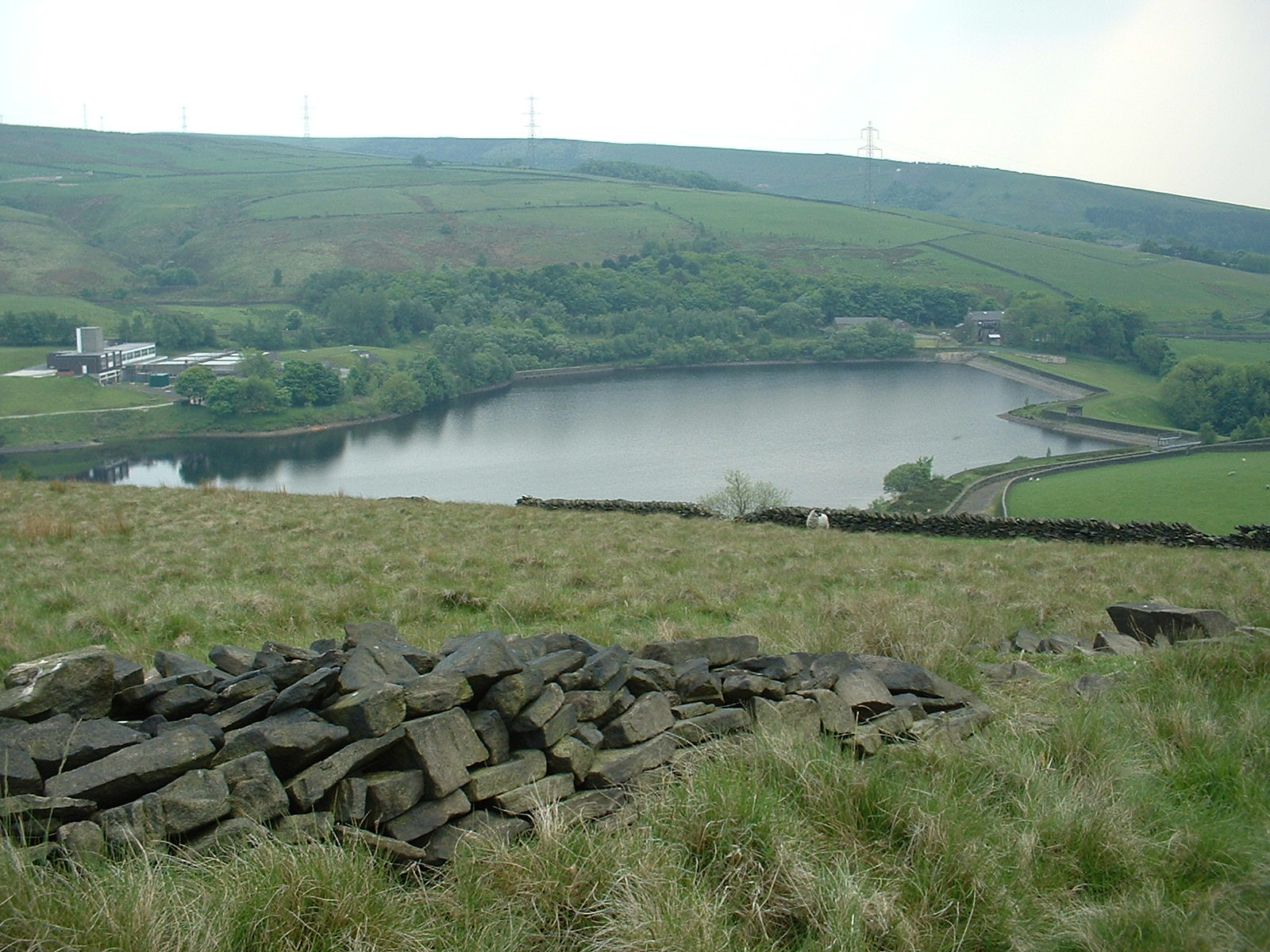

- Location within Greater Manchester
- Location: Greater Manchester
- Coordinates: 53°36′33″N 2°3′42″W
- Type: reservoir
- Primary inflows: Piethorne Brook
- Primary outflows: Piethorne Brook
- Basin countries: United Kingdom

Kitcliffe Reservoir is a reservoir in Piethorne Valley in between Ogden and Piethorne Reservoirs in the Metropolitan Borough of Rochdale, within Greater Manchester, England.

Next reservoir upstream	Piethorne Valley	Next reservoir downstream
Piethorne Reservoir	Kitcliffe Reservoir; Grid reference SD96021249	Ogden Reservoir
