= Waskerley Reservoir =

Reservoir in County Durham, England

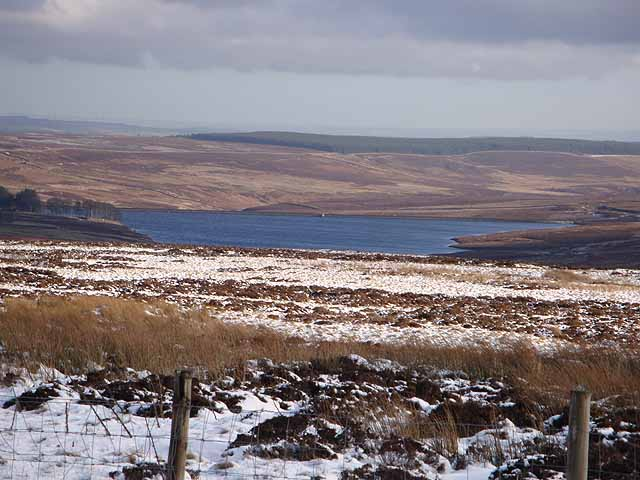
- Waskerley Reservoir

- Location within County Durham
- Location: County Durham, England
- Coordinates: 54°47′33″N 1°58′00″W
- Type: reservoir
- Catchment area: 15 km^{2} (5.8 sq mi)
- Managing agency: Northumbrian Water
- Max. depth: 24.3 m (80 ft)
- Water volume: 2.0 million cubic metres (1,600 acre⋅ft)
- Surface elevation: 355 m (1,165 ft) asl

Waskerley Reservoir is the largest of a group of three reservoirs located on Muggleswick Common, County Durham, with the others being Smiddy Shaw and Hisehope Reservoirs.

The reservoir, which was constructed in 1877, is owned and operated by Northumbrian Water. It and Smiddy Shaw—which in turn is fed by Hisehope—feed water under gravity to a water treatment works at Honey Hill. Because the three reservoirs cannot meet the full demand of Honey Hill, Waskerley can be replenished by a gravity feed from Burnhope Reservoir or, if necessary, by pumping water from the Tyne-Tees Tunnel via an airshaft.

Waskerley and its two neighbouring reservoirs are located within the Muggleswick, Stanhope and Edmundbyers Commons and Blanchland Moor Site of Special Scientific Interest, which itself forms part of the North Pennines Area of Outstanding Natural Beauty.

== See also ==
- List of reservoirs and dams in the United Kingdom
