= Sywell Country Park =

Sywell Reservoir
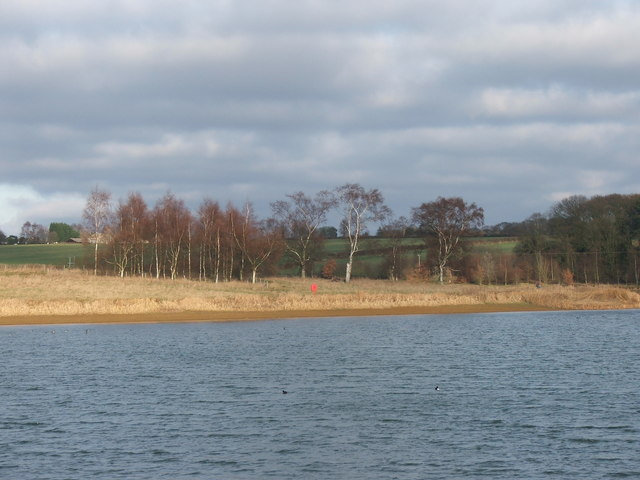
- Sywell Reservoir

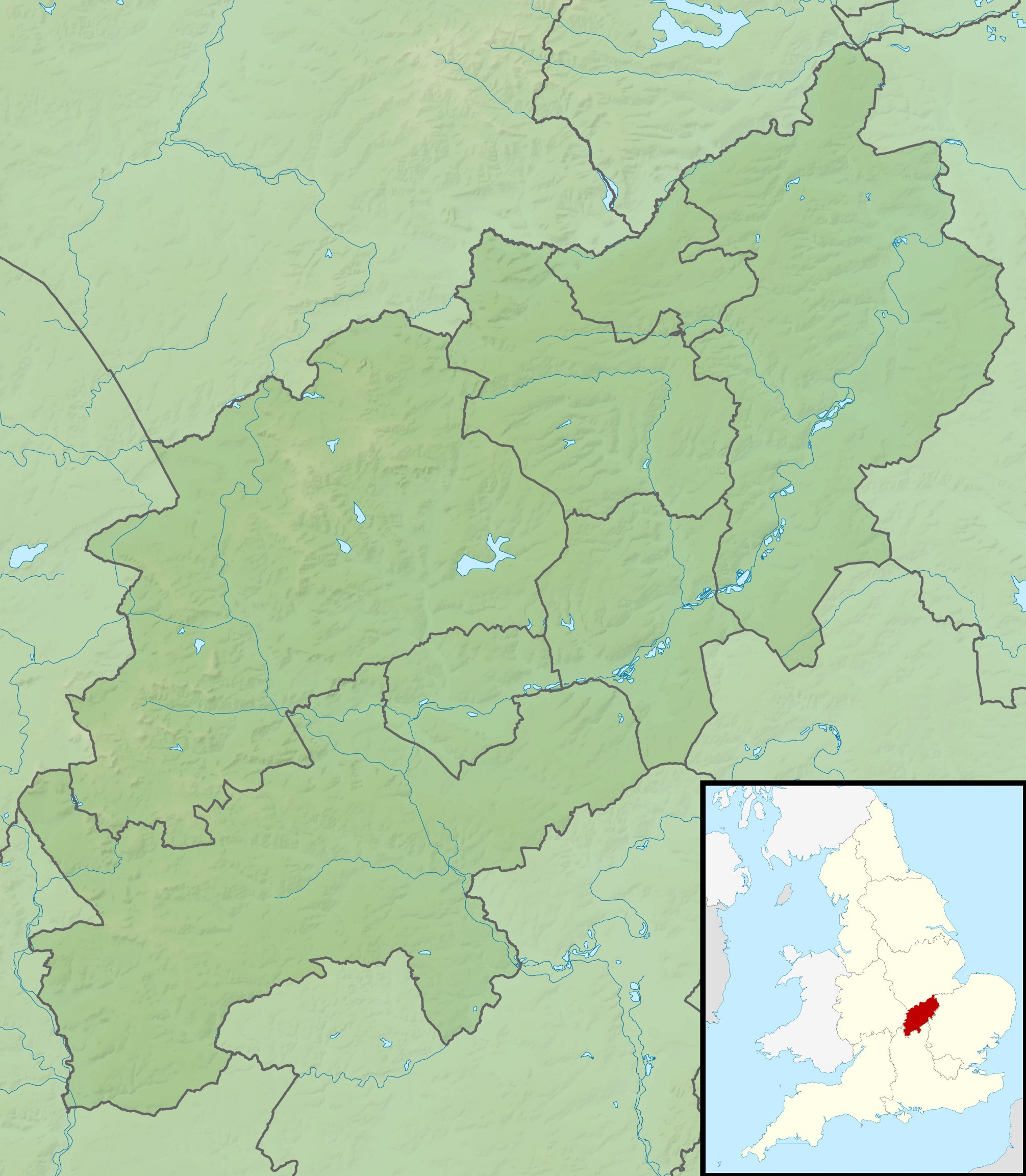
- Location within Northamptonshire
- Location: Northamptonshire
- Coordinates: 52°16′52″N 0°46′55″W
- Type: Reservoir
- Basin countries: United Kingdom

Sywell Country Park exists on the site of a former drinking water reservoir near the village of Sywell in East Northamptonshire, England.

The reservoir was built at the turn of the 20th century to supply water to the Higham Ferrers and Rushden areas. It operated between 1906 and 1979 and is now a country park run by Northamptonshire County Council. It has an area of 280,000 square metres. The land for the reservoir was purchased from the Stockdale family estate at adjoining Mears Ashby.

The site includes a small tea room. There is also a project which aims to use both oral and written records to interpret the route of the water supply throughout the site.

== Angling ==
The reservoir is considered as one of the leading tench fisheries in the country.
