= Piethorne Reservoir =

Reservoir in Rochdale, England

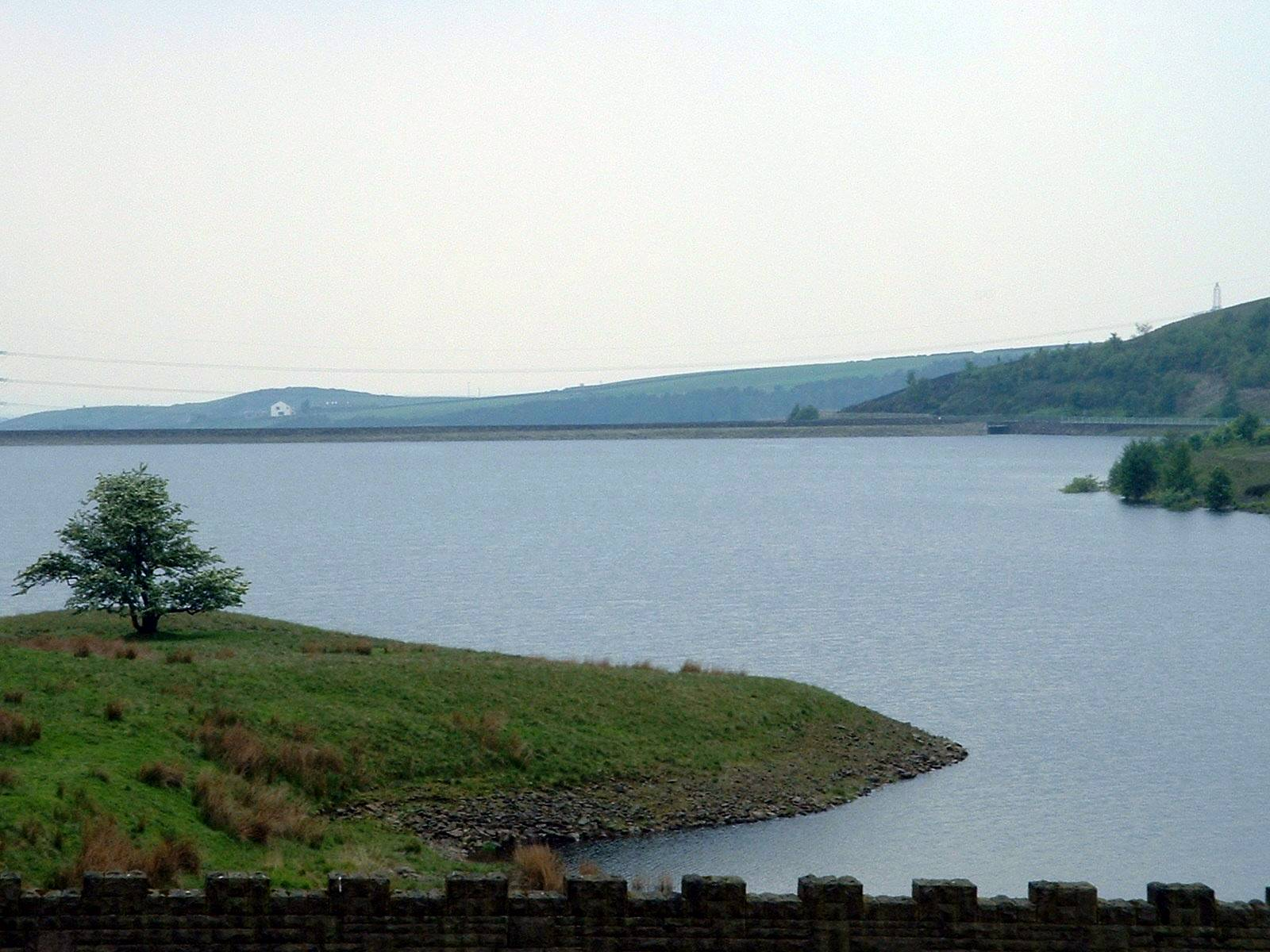

- Location within Greater Manchester
- Location: Rochdale, Greater Manchester, England
- Coordinates: 53°36′35″N 2°3′18″W
- Type: reservoir
- Primary inflows: Piethorne Brook; Cold Greave Brook
- Primary outflows: Piethorne Brook
- Basin countries: United Kingdom
- Max. depth: 22 m (72 ft)
- Water volume: 344 million imperial gallons (1,270 acre⋅ft)

Piethorne Reservoir is the largest of several reservoirs in the Piethorne Valley above Newhey, by Milnrow, in the Metropolitan Borough of Rochdale, Greater Manchester, England. It was built between 1858 and 1868.

During excavations at Piethorne in the mid-19th century, a Celtic spear-head with a 5-inch (130 mm) blade was unearthed, implying human habitation in the locality during the Bronze Age.

== History ==
=== Reasons for construction ===
The population of Oldham expanded from 25,000 in the 1830s to 120,000 in 1870, and there was insufficient water supply from the town's first two reservoirs and local wells to provide more than a few hours' supply a day. Oldham Corporation bought watershed land at Piethorne Valley, about 8 miles (13 km) from Oldham, in the area, subsequently, of Milnrow Local Board, to build a new reservoir.

=== Construction ===
Construction work started in 1858, the reservoir being first completely filled ten years later. During the excavations for the reservoir, a Celtic spear-head with a 5-inch (130 mm) blade was discovered, implying human habitation in the area during the Bronze Age. It was soon found that moorland silt was being carried into the reservoir from its feeder streams, Piethorne Brook and Cold Greave Brook; Hanging Lees Reservoir was next built as a settling reservoir. Four further reservoirs were built; Kitcliffe and Norman Hill in the 1870s, Ogden, started in 1878, to compensate mills further down Piethorne Brook for loss of water supply, following the Gas and Water Works Facilities Act 1870, and Rooden Reservoir later. A stone-step cascade, or man-made waterfall, carried Piethorne Brook from Norman Hill Reservoir to Piethorne Reservoir. Another stone-step cascade was built as an overflow from Ogden Reservoir. Horses were used to pull wagons along tramways to haul materials on site. Piethorne and the other reservoirs were built using an impermeable clay puddle core to seal the dams, supported by strong earth material. Navvies trod the clay wearing boots with sacking tied around their legs until the full reservoir height was reached.

=== The "Butty Gang" system ===
Navvies, shorthand for navigational engineers, worked on the reservoir under the "Butty Gang" system, whereby groups of navvies were paid on a fixed lump sum basis, leaving the workers to divide the money between themselves. They were well-paid, hard-working, and hard-living; some were lodged in the Long Shed at Kitcliffe. One Betty Whitehead, a seventy-year old local woman, recalled in the Oldham Chronicle newspaper in 1957 that the navvies "usually had a pocketful of money and a bellyful of beer". It was said that navvies "spilt more beer than locals drank". Fights were common.

=== Early water treatment ===
The moorland soil and water was, and remains, acidic. This put at risk Oldham Corporation's cast iron water pipes. Even before the reservoir was fully filled, lime had to be added to the water in Piethorne Reservoir to reduce its acidity. A stone building called the Lime House was built beside the reservoir in or about 1866 to store lime. The building remains, although a modern water treatment plant was built later.

== Piethorne Reservoir today ==
Piethorne Reservoir today carries 344 million gallons of water, enough for 7 million baths. It is 22 metres (72 ft) deep at its deepest point, and has embankments of 25 m (82 ft). The entire 736 hectare watershed, known as the Piethorne Valley, also hosts walking trails, angling, and provides opportunities for observing wildlife. The latter includes a wide variety of birds, including curlews, meadow pipits, wheatears, skylarks, and great crested grebes. Occasional sightings are made of buzzards and peregrines. Also many mammals and butterflies live in the vicinity of the reservoirs.

Next reservoir upstream	Piethorne Valley	Next reservoir downstream
Norman Hill Reservoir; Hanging Lees Reservoir	Piethorne Reservoir; Grid reference SD96501259	Kitcliffe Reservoir

== See also ==
Piethorne Brook

== External sources ==
http://www.unitedutilities.com/piethorne-valley.aspx https://visitrochdale.com/rochdale-all/where-to-go/piethorne-valley-p100181 http://www.manchesterscountryside.com https://www.geograph.org.uk/photo/2525952
