= Sandhill Lake =

Lake in Worksop, Nottinghamshire, England

Coordinates: 53°18′31″N 1°7′49″W

A panoramic photography picture showing Sandhill Lake at sunset on 20 April 2014.

Sandhill Lake is a small lake and park, west of the centre of Worksop, Nottinghamshire, England. It is passed by the Chesterfield Canal and the National Cycle Route 6. The lake is 7.6 hectares in area and the path around it has a circumference of 1.21 miles (1.95 km). The River Ryton passes just to the southwest of the canal. The lake, formerly known as Godfrey's Pond, is popular with local anglers, and the area is also used for other leisure activities.

== History ==
The lake is formed on the site of earlier mineral extraction activity from the Ryton floodplain.

On 3 November 2010 the park reopened after improvements under the Nottinghamshire County Council's ‘Local Improvement Scheme', funded by Groundwork Creswell, Ashfield and Mansfield and Crestra Ltd.

A £100,000 project in 2014 included installation of rwo rubber fishing platforms to encourage more recreational use of the lake, which were the subject of an arson attack on 12 October 2014.
