= Hisehope Reservoir =

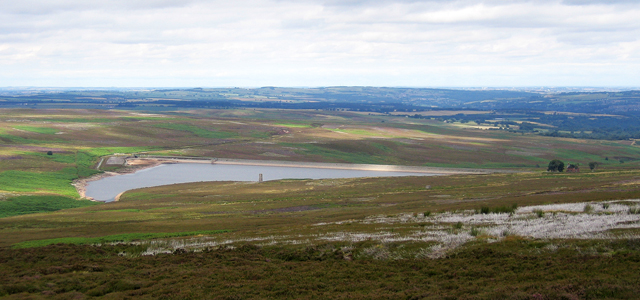
- Hisehope Reservoir

- Location within County Durham
- Location: County Durham, England
- Coordinates: 54°48′45″N 1°58′01″W
- Type: reservoir
- Managing agency: Northumbrian Water
- Surface elevation: 345 m (1,132 ft) asl

Hisehope Reservoir is the smallest of a group of three reservoirs located on Muggleswick Common, County Durham, the others being Waskerley and Smiddy Shaw Reservoirs.

The reservoir was completed 1906, and is owned and operated by Northumbrian Water. It feeds, via an open aqueduct, into Smiddy Shaw reservoir, which in turn feeds water under gravity to a water treatment works at Honey Hill.

The reservoir has a lengthy catchwater extending from the north end of its dam around Cross Rigg on Muggleswick Common. This significantly extends the catchment area.

Hisehope and its two neighbouring reservoirs are located within the Muggleswick, Stanhope and Edmundbyers Commons and Blanchland Moor Site of Special Scientific Interest, which itself forms part of the North Pennines Area of Outstanding Natural Beauty.

== See also ==
- List of reservoirs and dams in the United Kingdom
