= Nutscale Reservoir =

Reservoir in Somerset, England, UK

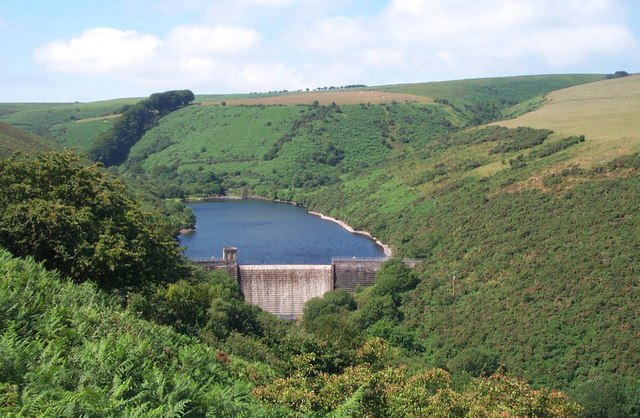

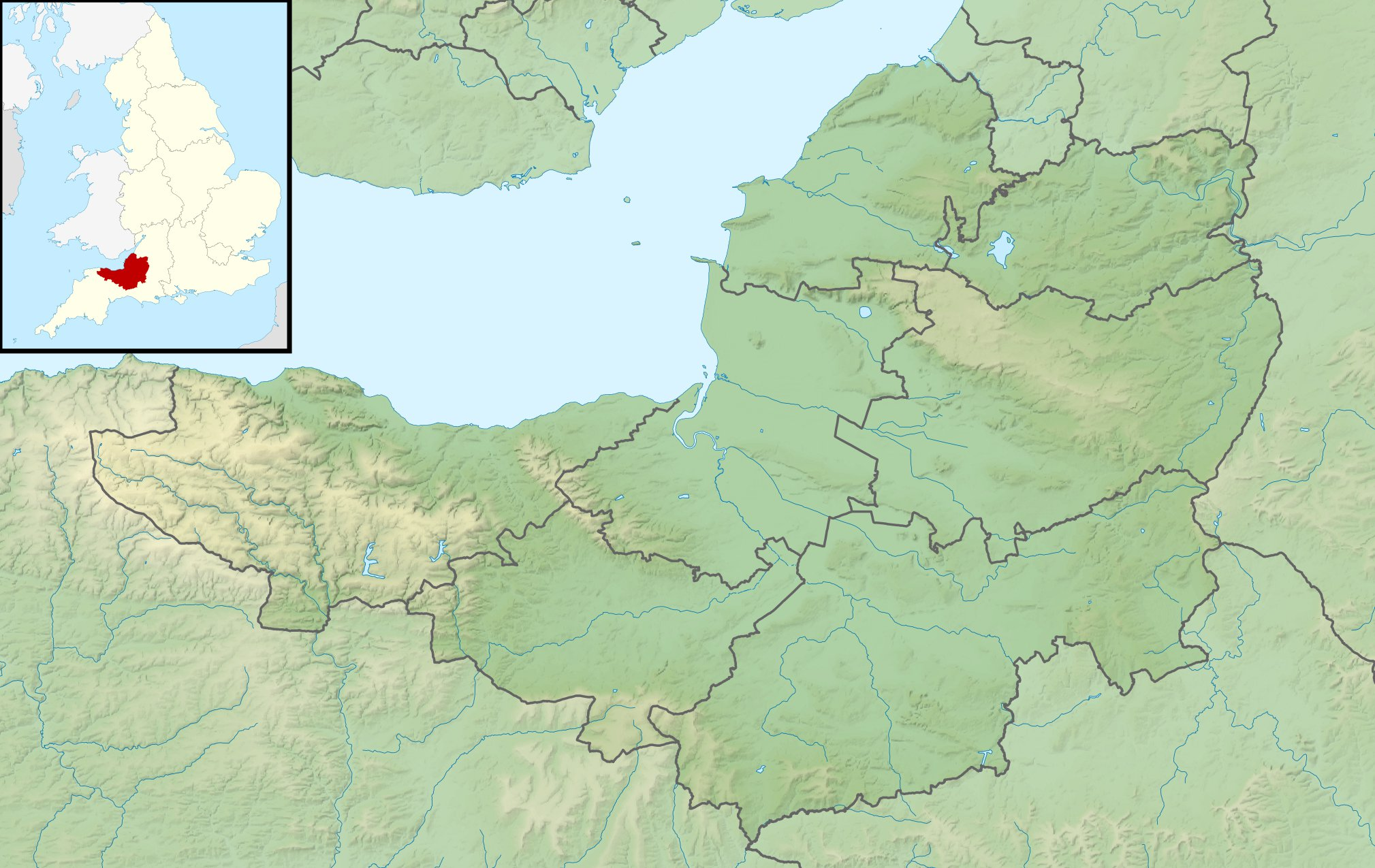
- Location within Somerset
- Location: Exmoor, Somerset, England
- Coordinates: 51.177°N 3.631°W
- Primary inflows: Nutscale Water
- Primary outflows: Nutscale Water
- Managing agency: Wessex Water
- Built: 1942
- Surface area: 8 acres (3.2 ha)
- Average depth: 12.2 metres (40 ft)
- Water volume: 277,000 m^{3} (225 acre⋅ft)
- Shore length^{1}: 1,140 metres (3,740 ft)
- ^{1} Shore length is not a well-defined measure.

Nutscale Reservoir is a reservoir located in Exmoor in north west Somerset, England. It was intended to supply the town of Minehead and nearby Porlock and Porlock Weir. The reservoir is part of the River Horner catchment area and is fed by Nutscale Water . The reservoir is no longer used for public drinking water supply.

The reservoir was built in 1942. A mass concrete gravity arch dam, 90m along the crest and 14m high impounds 36,000,000 imperial gallons (160,000,000 L; 43,000,000 US gal). This was intended to relieve summer droughts in Minehead.

High levels of geosmin were recorded in 2008. To manage the effects of this on tap water systems were developed to remove this reservoir from the drinking water supply when necessary and flush the pipe carrying the water.

The site is operated by Wessex Water whose drought plan suggests that six months would be required to bring Nutscale back into supply operations in a severe drought.

The fishing rights to the reservoir are owned by the National Trust, as part of its Holnicote Estate, and leased out privately.
