= Walkerwood Reservoir =

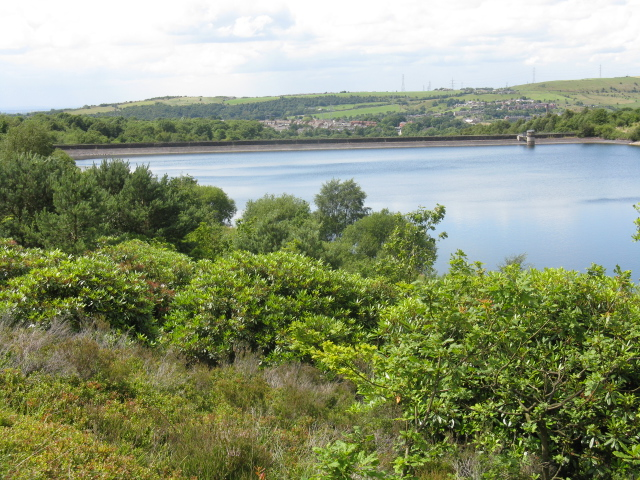
- Walkerwood Reservoir and dam

- Location within Greater Manchester
- Location: Greater Manchester
- Coordinates: 53.48802°N 2.02305°W
- Type: reservoir
- Max. depth: 61 ft (19 m)
- Water volume: 202,084,000 US gal (764,970,000 L; 168,270,000 imp gal)

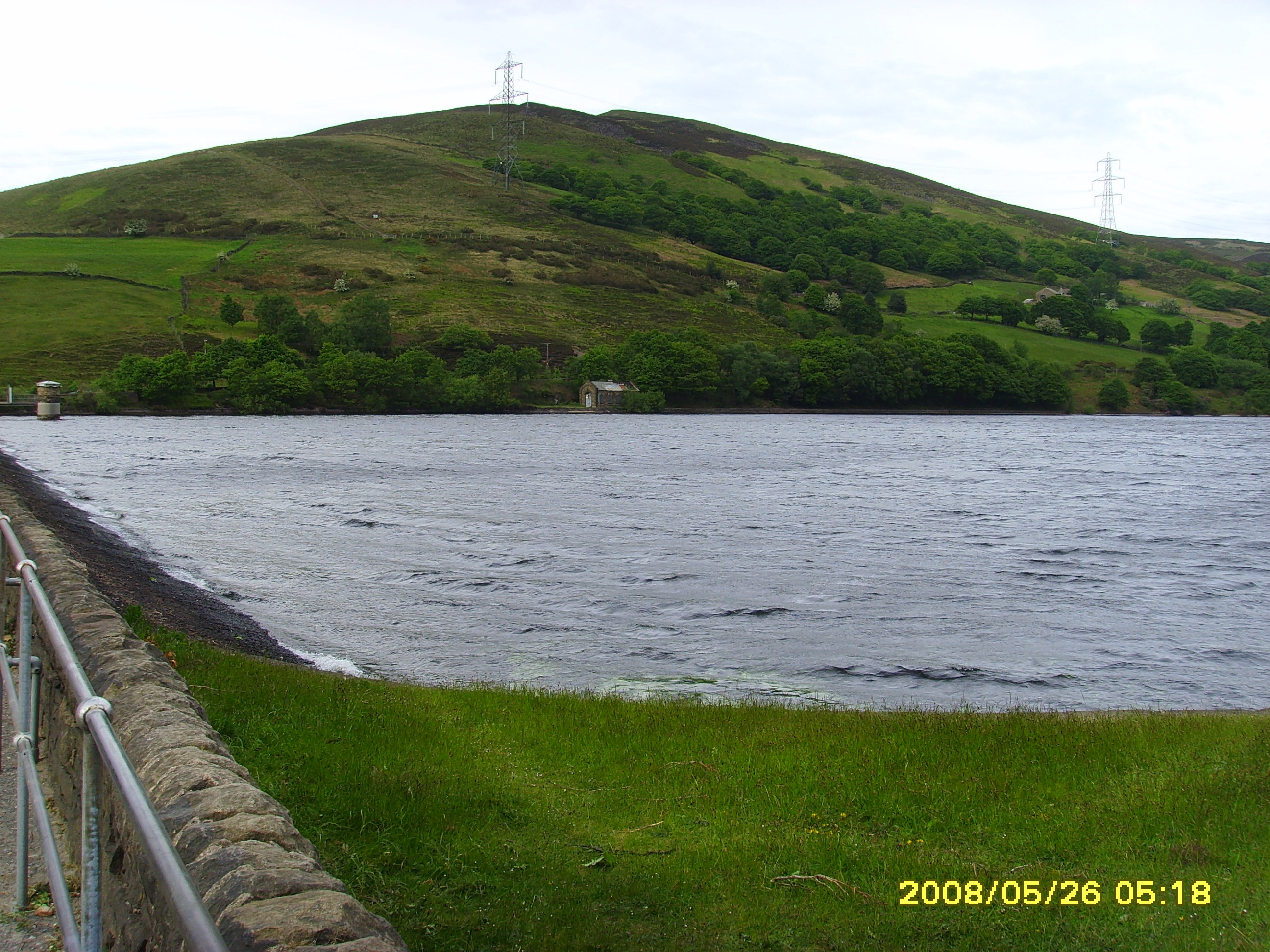
Walkerwood Reservoir (2008)

Walkerwood Reservoir is a reservoir in the Brushes Valley above Stalybridge in Greater Manchester. It was built in the 19th century by the corporations of Ashton-under-Lyne and Stalybridge to provide a supply of safe drinking water, one of four reservoirs authorised by the Ashton-under-Lyne and Stalybridge (Corporations) Waterworks Act 1864 (27 & 28 Vict. c. xlvii). It is owned and operated by United Utilities.

The revetment was increasingly vulnerable to wave action so has been strengthened by filling existing holes in the concrete with lean sand asphalt (LSA) and overlaying with open stone asphalt (OSA).

== Capacity ==
Brushes Valley reservoirs
Name	Depth of reservoir	Capacity of reservoir
Walkerwood Reservoir	61 ft (19 m)	202,084,000 US gal (764,970,000 L; 168,270,000 imp gal)
Brushes Reservoir	44 ft (13 m)	52,165,000 US gal (197,470,000 L; 43,436,000 imp gal)
Lower Swineshaw Reservoir	33 ft (10 m)	55,500,000 US gal (210,000,000 L; 46,200,000 imp gal)
Higher Swineshaw Reservoir	53 ft (16 m)	168,908,000 US gal (639,390,000 L; 140,645,000 imp gal)
Total	-	882,939,000 US gal (3.34229×10^{9} L; 735,201,000 imp gal)

== See also ==
- Brushes Reservoir
- Lower Swineshaw Reservoir
- Higher Swineshaw Reservoir
