= Rooden Reservoir =

Freshwater lake in North-West England

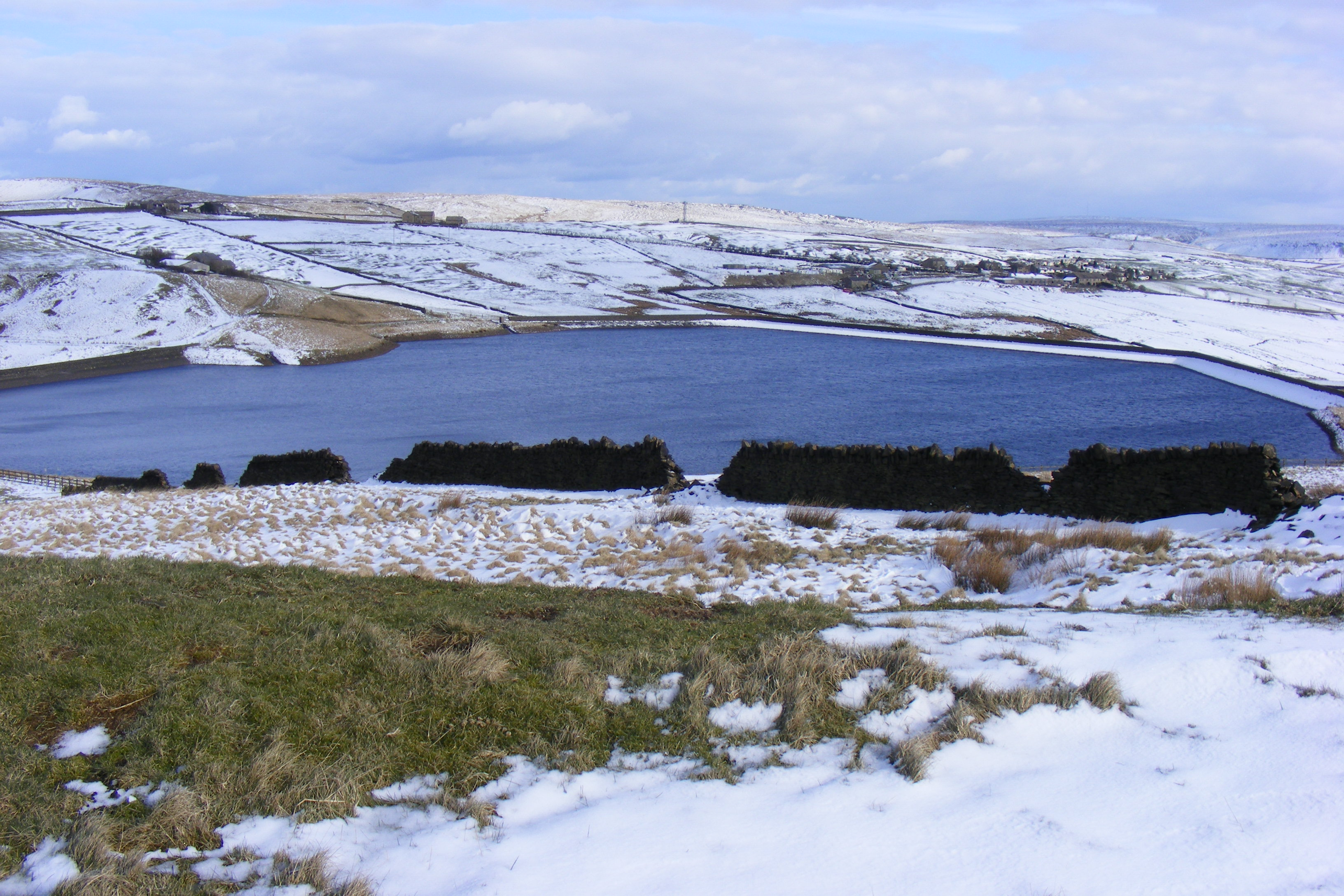

- Location within Greater Manchester
- Location: Greater Manchester
- Coordinates: 53°36′10″N 2°2′43″W
- Type: Reservoir
- Primary inflows: Rooden Catchwater from Piethorne Brook
- Basin countries: United Kingdom

Rooden Reservoir is a reservoir in the Piethorne Valley in the Metropolitan Borough of Rochdale, within Greater Manchester, England. It is close to Denshaw in the Metropolitan Borough of Oldham.

Next reservoir upstream	Piethorne Valley	Next reservoir downstream
none	Rooden Reservoir; Grid reference SD97101182	Hanging Lees Reservoir
