= Drayton Reservoir =

Reservoir in Northamptonshire, England

- The Drayton offers 123 individual fishing platforms

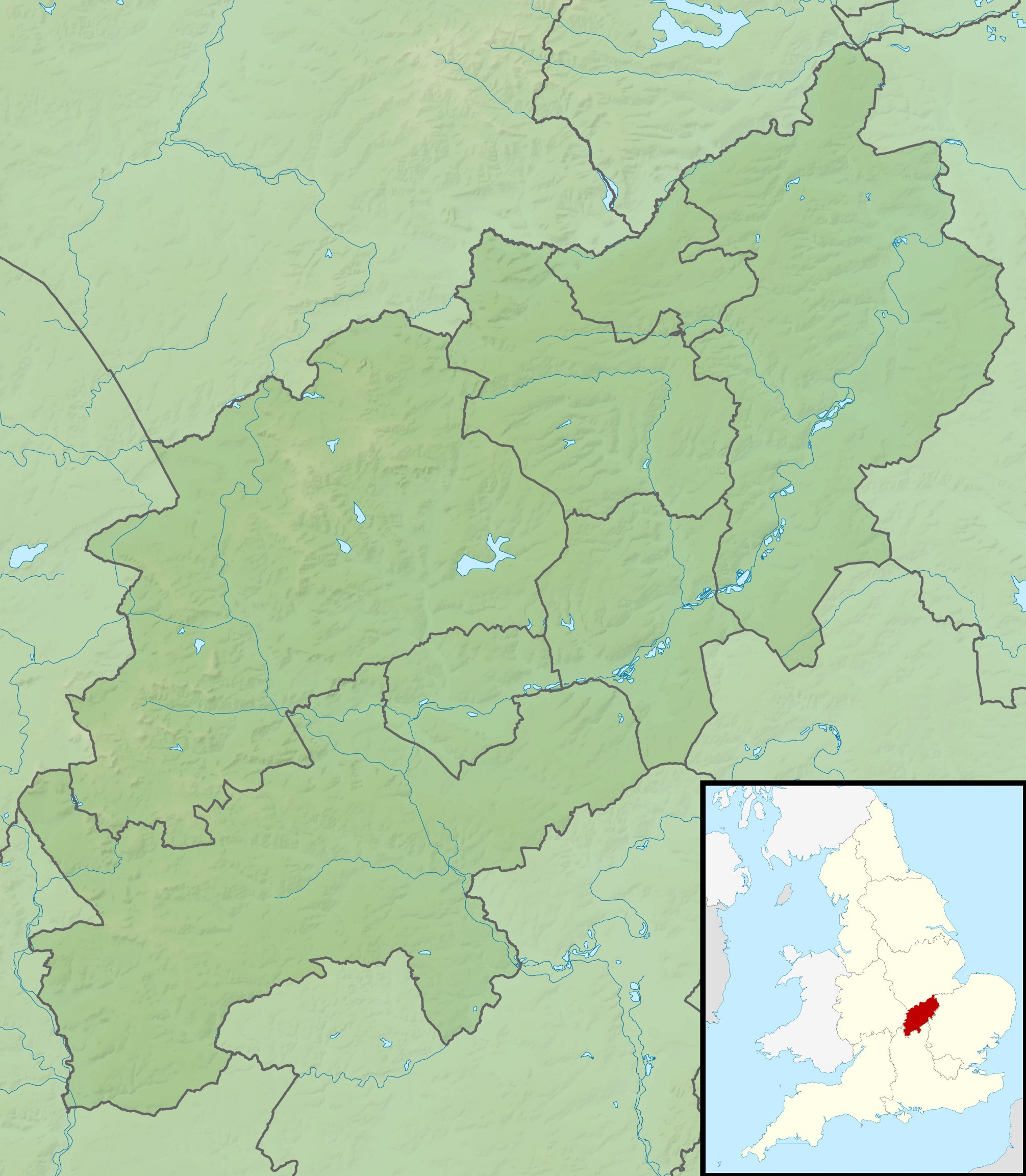
- Location within Northamptonshire
- Location: Daventry, Northamptonshire
- Coordinates: 52.279°N 1.169°W
- Lake type: reservoir
- Basin countries: United Kingdom
- Surface elevation: 135 m (443 ft)

Drayton Reservoir is a reservoir in Daventry, Northamptonshire, England. The reservoir is accessible from the A361 near the northern edge of Daventry. Drayton Reservoir is a feeder reservoir for the Grand Union Canal. When water is required for the canal the water level at Drayton can drop by 30 cm or more in a day. Drayton Reservoir was controlled by British Waterways until their responsibilities for waterways in England and Wales were transferred to the Canal & River Trust and is home to Rugby Sailing Club.

It lies near another Grand Union Canal feature, Braunston Tunnel.

== Angling ==
Drayton Reservoir is known to UK anglers as one of England's premier match fishing venues. It was stocked with 50,000 small carp and these have grown quickly. 9lb (4 kg) Drayton Reservoir carp are commonplace. 20lb (9 kg) carp are caught very regularly with larger specimens available. Anglers are advised to ensure they have angling equipment that can handle the large fish and that they watch their rods and poles; hundreds of rods and poles have been pulled into the reservoir by fish.

British Waterways manage the fishery with bailiffs patrolling every few hours. They provide advice in addition to selling day tickets. There is limited parking by the dam wall and a toilet. With the exception of the dam wall most of the well managed fishing pegs are open to wheelchair access.
