= Brushes Reservoir =

Reservoir in Greater Manchester, England

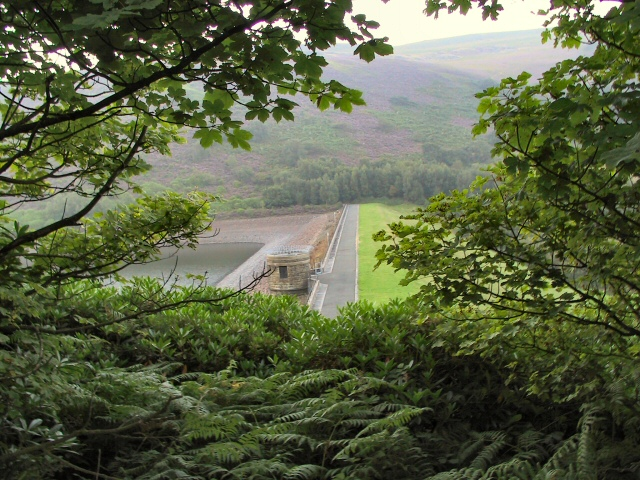
- Brushes Reservoir and dam

- Location within Greater Manchester
- Location: Stalybridge, Greater Manchester, England
- Coordinates: 53.4887°N 2.0116°W
- Type: Reservoir
- Max. depth: 44 ft (13 m)
- Water volume: 52,165,000 US gal (197,470,000 L; 43,436,000 imp gal)

Brushes Reservoir is the second lowest reservoir of a series of four in the Brushes Valley above Stalybridge in Greater Manchester, England. It was built in the 19th century by the corporations of Ashton-under-Lyne and Stalybridge to provide a supply of safe drinking water, one of four reservoirs authorised by the Ashton-under-Lyne and Stalybridge (Corporations) Waterworks Act 1864 (27 & 28 Vict. c. xlvii).

It is owned and operated by United Utilities. The reservoir dam consists of a clay core within an earth embankment.

== Capacity ==
Brushes Valley reservoirs
Name	Depth of reservoir	Capacity of reservoir
Walkerwood Reservoir	61 ft (19 m)	202,084,000 US gal (764,970,000 L; 168,270,000 imp gal)
Brushes Reservoir	44 ft (13 m)	52,165,000 US gal (197,470,000 L; 43,436,000 imp gal)
Lower Swineshaw Reservoir	33 ft (10 m)	55,500,000 US gal (210,000,000 L; 46,200,000 imp gal)
Higher Swineshaw Reservoir	53 ft (16 m)	168,908,000 US gal (639,390,000 L; 140,645,000 imp gal)
Total	-	882,939,000 US gal (3.34229×10^{9} L; 735,201,000 imp gal)

== See also ==
- Walkerwood Reservoir
- Lower Swineshaw Reservoir
- Higher Swineshaw Reservoir
