= Rumworth Lodge Reservoir =

Reservoir in Greater Manchester, England

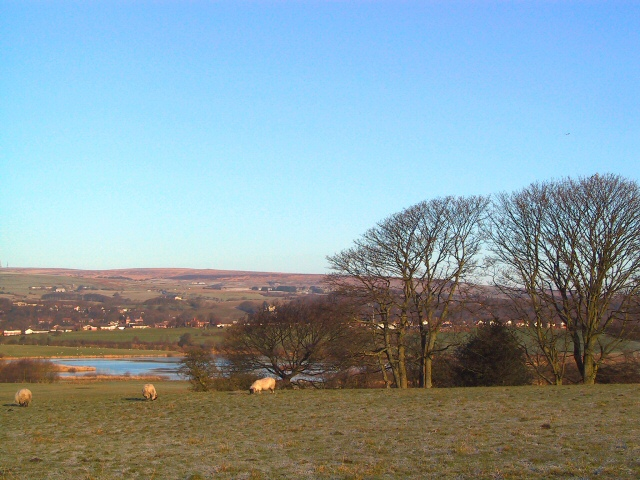

- Location within Greater Manchester
- Location: Greater Manchester, England
- Coordinates: 53°34′1″N 2°29′15″W

Rumworth Lodge Reservoir is a large shallow reservoir in Bolton, Greater Manchester, England.

It is located to the west of Bolton's A58 (Beaumont Road) and to the South-East of Lostock railway station. The water from the reservoir is not used for drinking water but provides compensation water so that the Middlebrook, which downstream becomes the River Croal, never runs dry. It is a magnet for birds, particularly on spring and autumn passage when many rare species have been recorded. Fields between the wood and the lodge are also the site of rare autumn crocus.

== Fishing ==
The 33 acres (13 ha) reservoir is used for fishing and an annual fishing permit and the appropriate Environment Agency licences are required. The reservoir is stocked with bream, carp, roach and perch.

== Ornithology ==
Rumworth Lodge Reservoir is of great ornithological interest. The Reservoir's reedbeds have both reed and sedge warbler in summer and once played host to the county's first ever marsh warbler. Many other species of bird have been recorded at the site. These include

- Arctic skua
- Avocet
- Brent goose
- Little egret
- Great grey shrike
- Great northern diver
- Marsh warbler
- Pectoral sandpiper
- Purple sandpiper
- Temminck's stint
- Red-necked grebe
- Ring-necked duck
- Richard's pipit
