= Norman Hill Reservoir =

Freshwater lake in North-West England

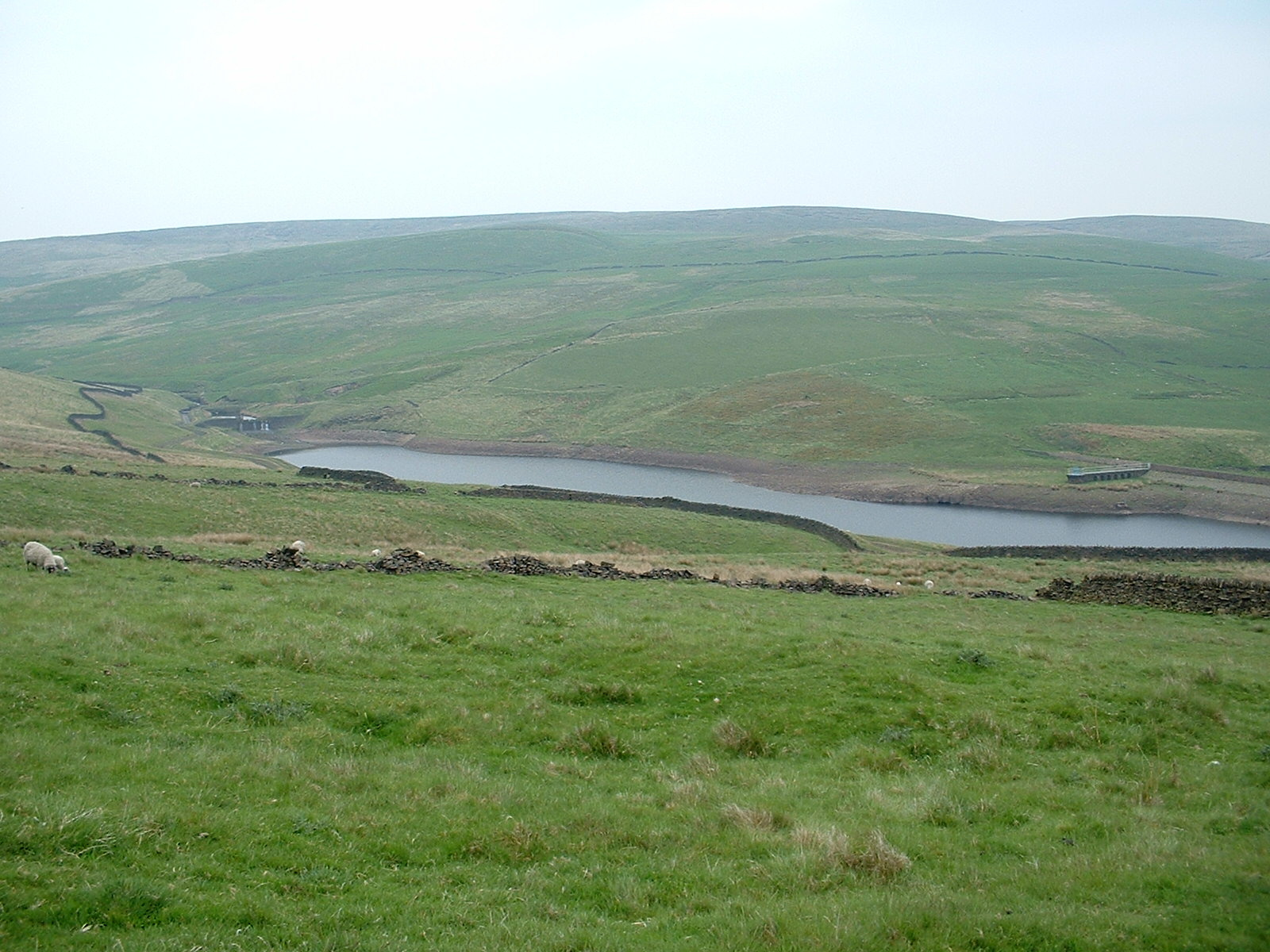

- Location within Greater Manchester
- Location: Greater Manchester
- Coordinates: 53°36′53″N 2°2′55″W
- Type: reservoir
- Primary inflows: Piethorne Brook
- Primary outflows: Piethorne Brook
- Basin countries: United Kingdom

Norman Hill Reservoir is a reservoir in the Piethorne Valley in the Metropolitan Borough of Rochdale, within Greater Manchester, England.

Next reservoir upstream	Piethorne Valley	Next reservoir downstream
none	Norman Hill Reservoir; Grid reference SD96891311	Piethorne Reservoir
