= Ogden Reservoir (Greater Manchester) =

Reservoir in Rochdale, England

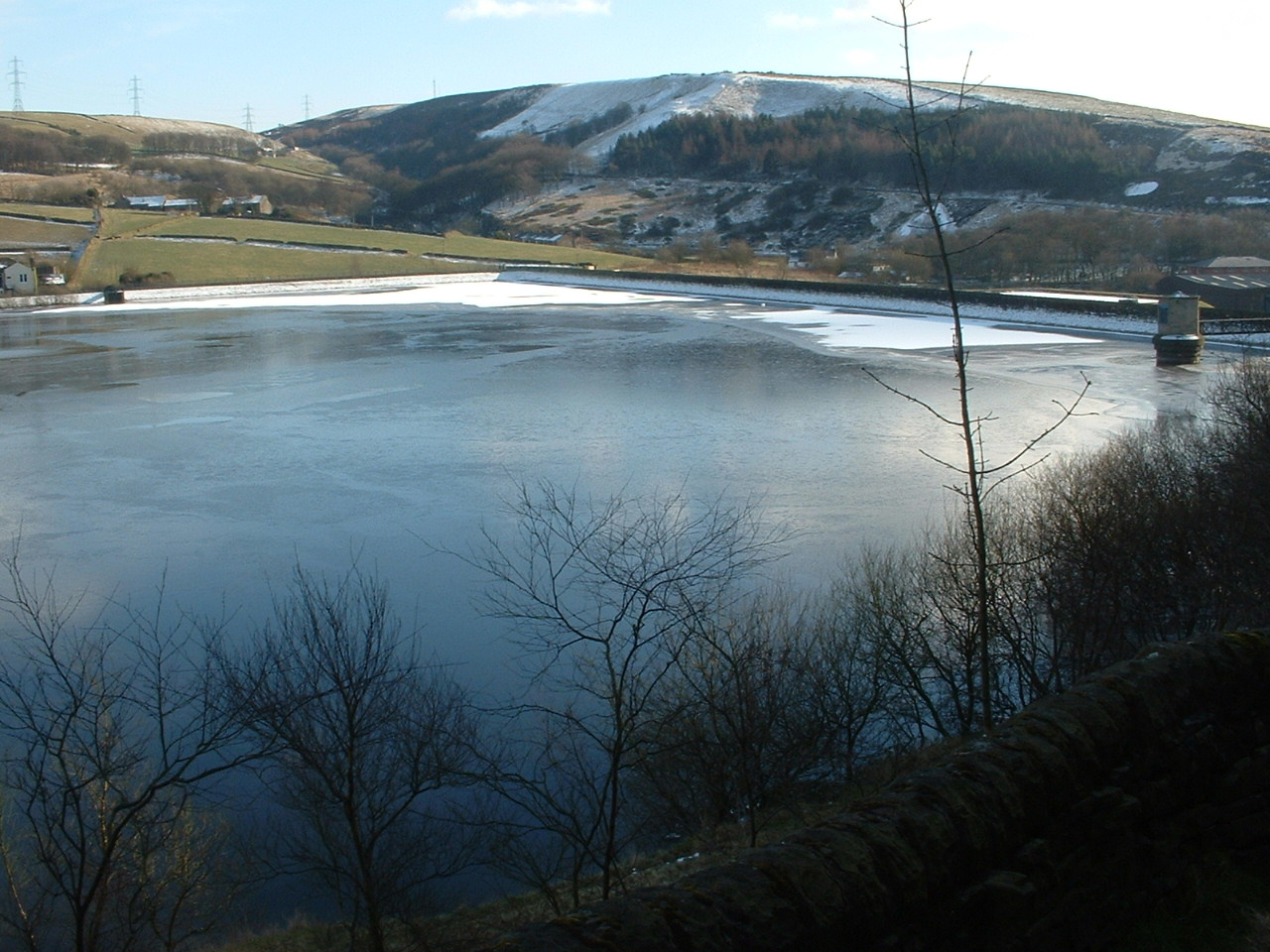
- Ice cover in early 2006

- Location within Greater Manchester
- Location: Greater Manchester
- Coordinates: 53.609°N 2.073°W
- Type: reservoir
- Primary inflows: Piethorne Brook; Wickenhall Brook; Rag Hole Brook
- Primary outflows: Piethorne Brook
- Basin countries: England, United Kingdom

Ogden Reservoir is a reservoir in the Piethorne Valley, close to Milnrow and Newhey in the Metropolitan Borough of Rochdale, within Greater Manchester, England.

== History ==
The reservoir was commissioned in 1878 collecting water from Piethorne Brook and Wickenhall Brook, to provide drinking water for Oldham.

The reservoir is used for coarse fishing. Fish caught in the 2007 and 2008 seasons include Bream to 13 lb, Carp to 28 lb and Pike to 25 lb. Day tickets are available.

In the year 2005, the body of a man was discovered floating on a nearby overflow.

Next reservoir upstream	Piethorne Valley	Next reservoir downstream
Kitcliffe Reservoir	Ogden Reservoir; Grid reference SD95291245	None
