= Smiddy Shaw Reservoir =

Reservoir in County Durham, England

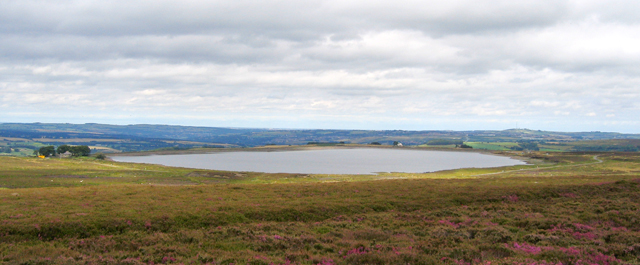
- Smiddy Shaw Reservoir

- Location within County Durham
- Location: County Durham, England
- Coordinates: 54°48′40″N 1°56′02″W
- Type: reservoir
- Catchment area: 6 km^{2} (2.3 sq mi)
- Managing agency: Northumbrian Water
- Max. depth: 12.3 m (40 ft)
- Water volume: 1.35 million cubic metres (1,090 acre⋅ft)
- Surface elevation: 340 m (1,120 ft) asl

Smiddy Shaw Reservoir is one of a group of three reservoirs located on Muggleswick Common, County Durham, the others being Waskerley and Hisehope Reservoirs.

The reservoir, which was completed by 1872, is owned and operated by Northumbrian Water. It, and Waskerley, feed water under gravity to a water treatment works at Honey Hill, while Hisehope feeds into Smiddy Shaw.

Smiddy Shaw and its two neighbouring reservoirs are located within the Muggleswick, Stanhope and Edmundbyers Commons and Blanchland Moor Site of Special Scientific Interest, which itself forms part of the North Pennines Area of Outstanding Natural Beauty.

== See also ==
- List of reservoirs and dams in the United Kingdom
