= Lower Swineshaw Reservoir =

Reservoir in Greater Manchester, England

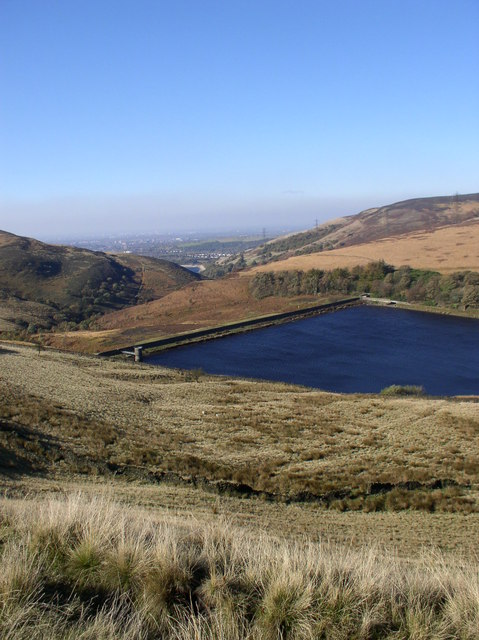
- Lower Swineshaw Reservoir and dam

- Location within Greater Manchester
- Location: Greater Manchester
- Coordinates: 53.4883°N 1.9970°W
- Max. depth: 33 ft (10 m)
- Water volume: 55,500,000 US gal (210,000,000 L; 46,200,000 imp gal)

Lower Swineshaw Reservoir is the second reservoir from the top of a series of four in the Brushes Valley above Stalybridge in Greater Manchester. It was built in the 19th century by the corporations of Ashton-under-Lyne and Stalybridge to provide a supply of safe drinking water, one of four reservoirs authorised by the Ashton-under-Lyne and Stalybridge (Corporations) Waterworks Act 1864 (27 & 28 Vict. c. xlvii). It is owned and operated by United Utilities. The reservoir dam consists of a clay core within an earth embankment.

== Capacity ==
Brushes Valley reservoirs
| Name | Depth of reservoir | Capacity of reservoir |
|---|---|---|
| Walkerwood Reservoir | 61 ft (19 m) | 202,084,000 US gal (764,970,000 L; 168,270,000 imp gal) |
| Brushes Reservoir | 44 ft (13 m) | 52,165,000 US gal (197,470,000 L; 43,436,000 imp gal) |
| Lower Swineshaw Reservoir | 33 ft (10 m) | 55,500,000 US gal (210,000,000 L; 46,200,000 imp gal) |
| Higher Swineshaw Reservoir | 53 ft (16 m) | 168,908,000 US gal (639,390,000 L; 140,645,000 imp gal) |
| Total | - | 882,939,000 US gal (3.34229×10^{9} L; 735,201,000 imp gal) |

== See also ==
- Walkerwood Reservoir
- Brushes Reservoir
- Higher Swineshaw Reservoir
