= Welford Reservoir =

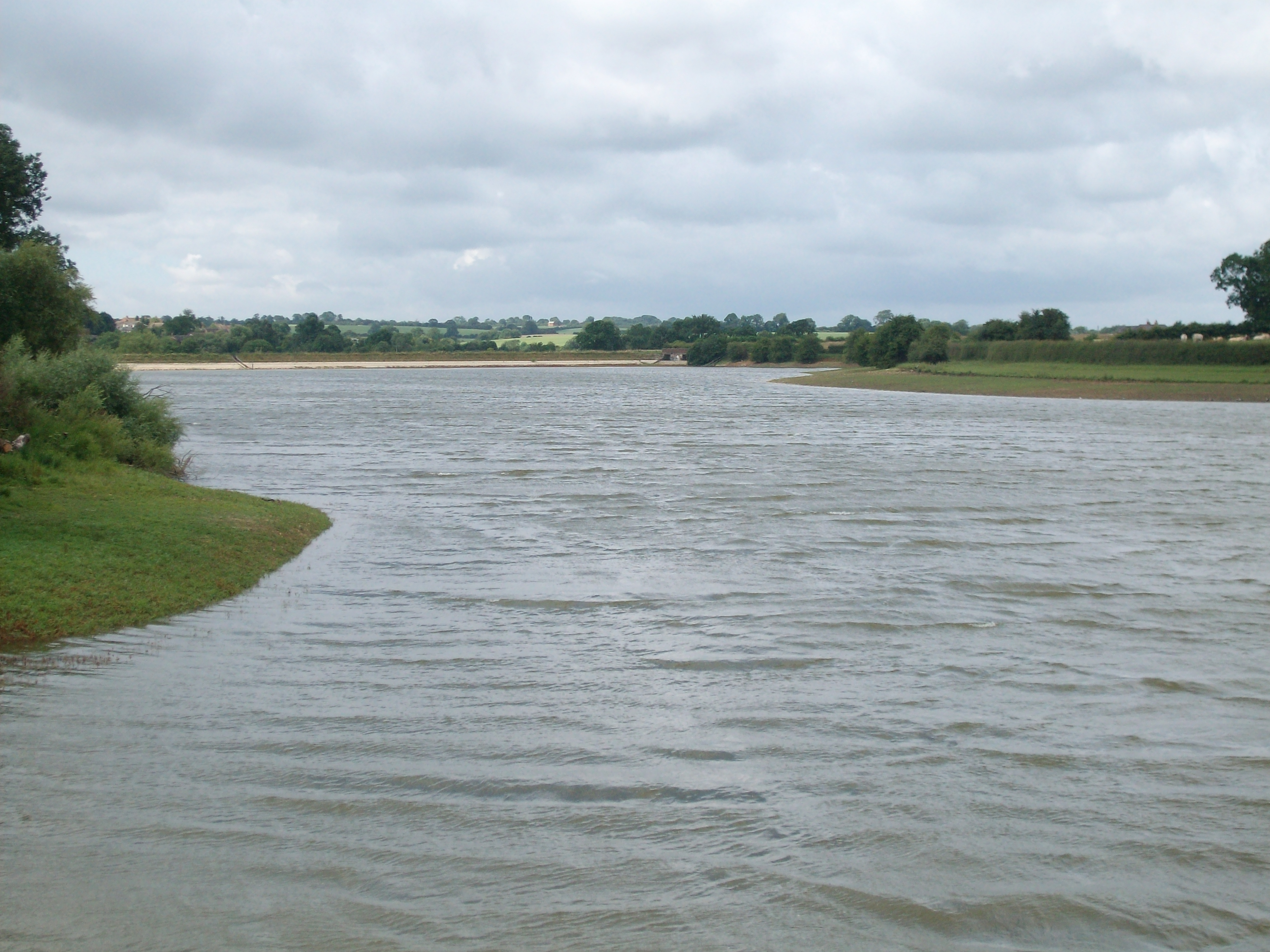

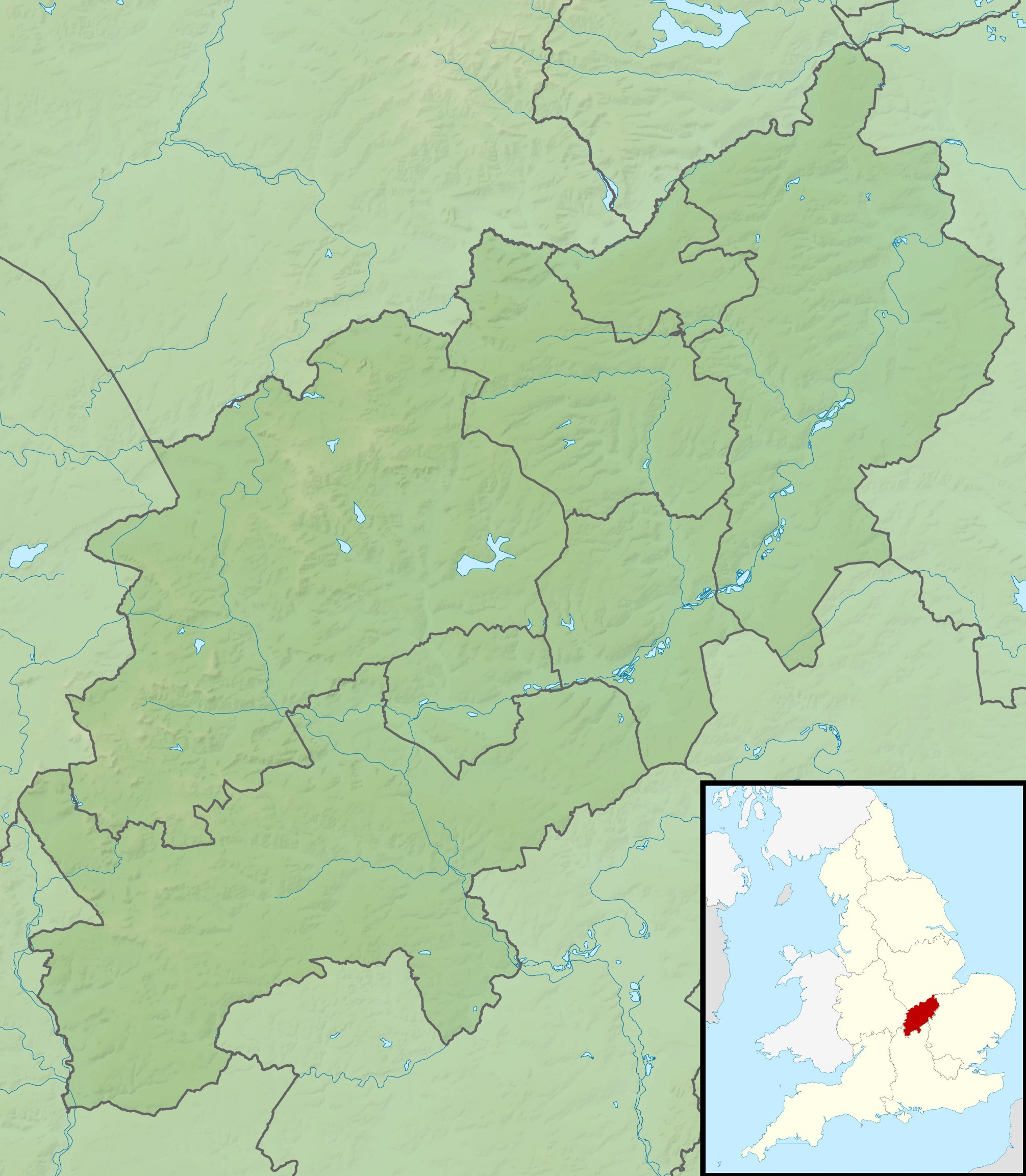
- Location within Northamptonshire
- Location: Northamptonshire
- Coordinates: 52°25′27″N 1°02′46″W
- Type: reservoir
- Basin countries: United Kingdom

Welford Reservoir is in the English county of Northamptonshire.

Welford Reservoir is the lower of a pair of reservoirs owned by the Canal & River Trust – the other being Sulby Reservoir – that provide water to the summit level of the Grand Union Canal by way of the navigable Welford Arm.
