= Sulby Reservoir (Northamptonshire) =

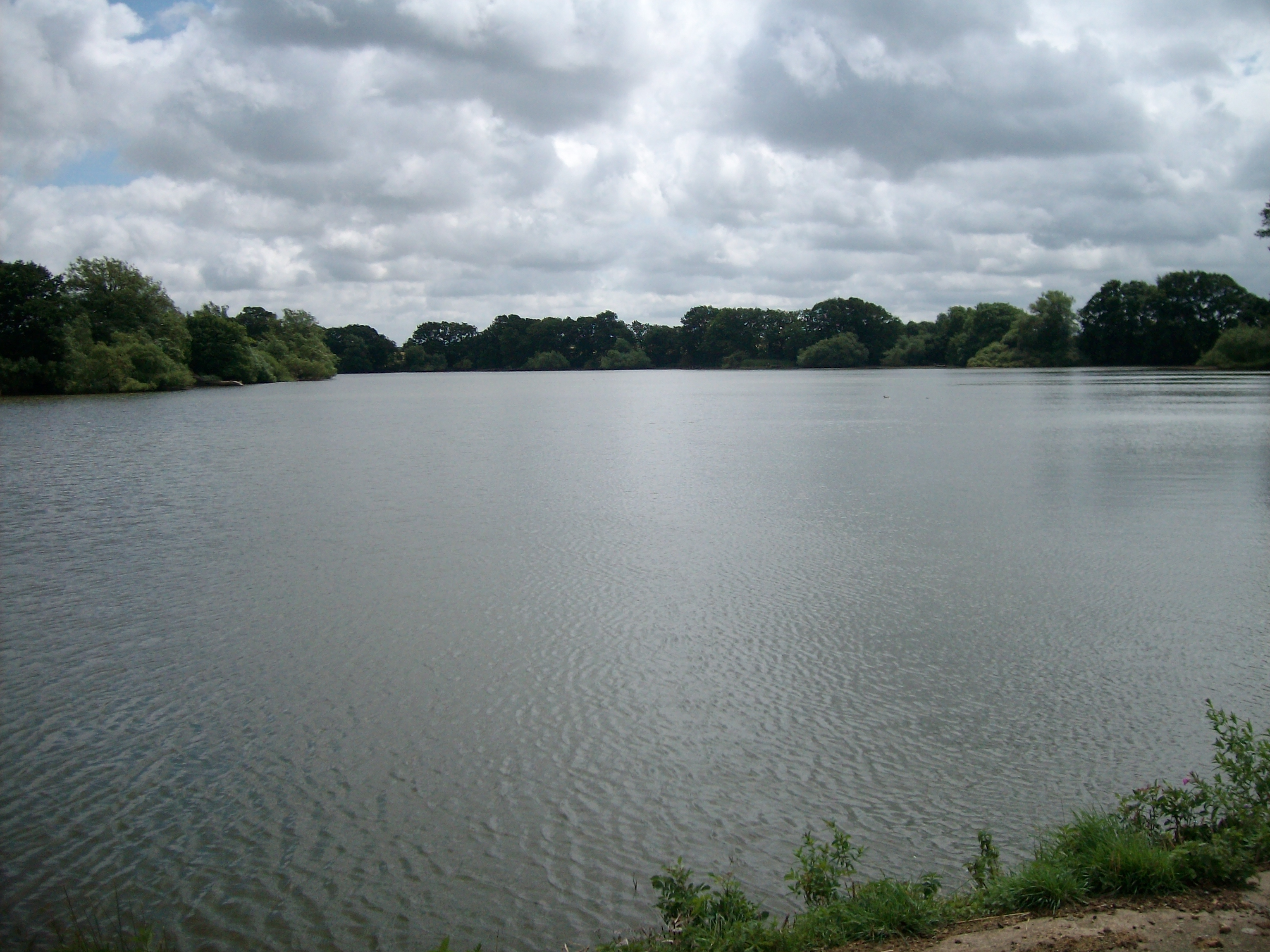

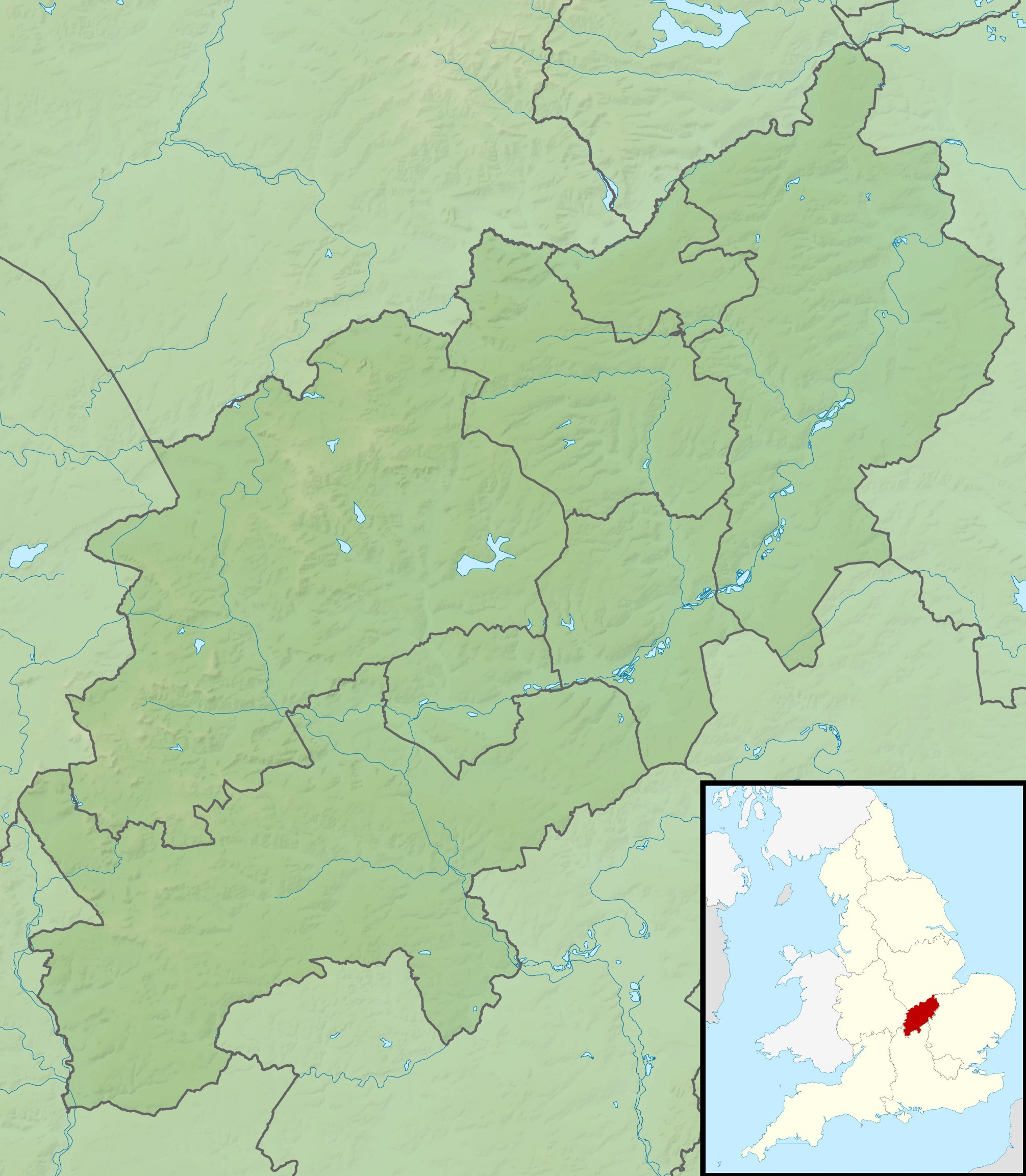
- Location within Northamptonshire
- Location: Northamptonshire
- Coordinates: 52°25′23″N 1°02′09″W
- Type: reservoir
- Basin countries: United Kingdom

Sulby Reservoir is in the English county of Northamptonshire.

Sulby Reservoir is the higher of a pair of reservoirs owned by the Canal & River Trust – the other being Welford Reservoir – that provide water to the summit level of the Grand Union Canal by way of the navigable Welford Arm.
