= Loch an Add =

Reservoir in Scotland

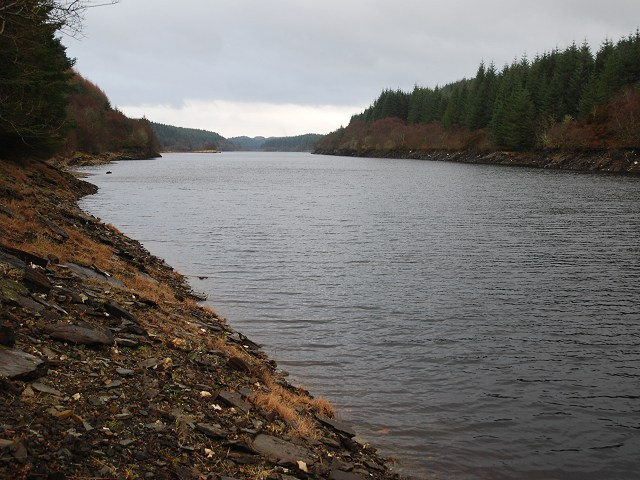
- Loch an Add, from its southeast shore

- Location within Argyll and Bute
- Location: Scottish Highlands
- Coordinates: 56°02′33″N 5°31′33″W
- Primary outflows: Barnagad Burn, Daill Loch
- Basin countries: Scotland, United Kingdom
- Max. length: 1.88 km (1.17 mi)
- Max. width: 282.3 m (926 ft)
- Surface elevation: 160 m (520 ft)

Loch an Add is a reservoir in Argyll, Scotland, roughly 3 km southwest of the village of Cairnbaan and 6 km west of the larger settlement of Lochgilphead. It is roughly 1 mile (1.6 km) long and up to 280 metres wide, and is longitudinal in a SW/NE orientation, occupying one several small parallel valleys between successive ridges (a geological formation closely resembling that of Anglesey) in an area of coniferous forest.

It is not to be confused with Lochan Add, a smaller body of water with roughly the same shape and orientation, but situated about 20 km to the north-east. Furthermore, neither of these two lochs is connected to the River Add, mentioned below.

The loch is one of several reservoirs within the Glen Clachaig Feeder System that supplies water to the Crinan Canal. It is maintained by an earthen dam at its north end, and is currently managed by Scottish Canals. Immediately downstream of this dam is another reservoir, Daill Loch, which is drained by the Dunardy Burn into the Crinan Canal.

Loch an Add was first named in 1814 by Scottish engineer Hugh Baird, designer of the Crinan and Union Canals. Baird's toponymy is unclear. One explanation is that it derives from the same Scottish Gaelic root as the River Add, àd or fhàd, which is a lenited form of fada meaning "long" i.e. "Long Loch". Another explanation is that Add is an Anglicisation of àth, meaning "ford" i.e. "Loch of the Ford".

The loch has a large stock of brown trout.
