= Daill Loch =

Lake in Scotland

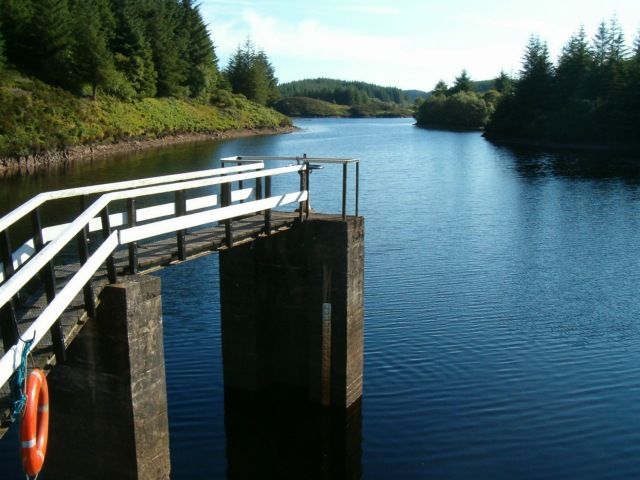

- Location within Argyll and Bute
- Location: Knapdale, Scotland
- Coordinates: 56.0523°N 5.5125°W grid reference NR81619016
- Type: Reservoir
- Primary outflows: Dunadry Burn
- Basin countries: Scotland, United Kingdom
- Surface area: 123,475 m^{2} (1,329,070 sq ft)
- Surface elevation: 155 m (509 ft)

Daill Loch is an impounding reservoir located 5 kilometres (3.1 mi) west north west of Lochgilphead and 1.5 kilometres (0.93 mi) south of the Crinan Canal. It is one of a number of lochs supplying water to the canal. The earthen dam is 8.1 metres (27 ft) high and was completed in 1930.

== See also ==
- List of reservoirs and dams in the United Kingdom

== Sources ==
- "Argyll and Bute Council Reservoirs Act 1975 Public Register"
