= List of listed buildings in South Knapdale, Argyll and Bute =

This is a list of listed buildings in the parish of South Knapdale in Argyll and Bute, Scotland.

== List ==
Name	Location	Date Listed	Grid Ref. (Note: Sometimes known as OSGB36, the grid reference (where provided) is based on the British national grid reference system used by the Ordnance Survey. • "Guide to National Grid". Ordnance Survey. • "Get-a-map". Ordnance Survey.)	Geo-coordinates	Notes	LB Number (Note: Historic Environment Scotland assign a unique alphanumeric identifier to each designated site in Scotland, for listed buildings this always begins with "LB", for example "LB12345".)	Image
Stonefield Castle Policies, Campbell Of Stonefield Mausoleum				55°53′51″N 5°25′15″W	Category B	19144	Upload Photo
K6 Telephone Kiosk At Ardpatrick Road End, West Loch Tarbert				55°47′20″N 5°34′16″W	Category B	18982	Upload another image
Inverneil Bridge Inverneil Burn				55°58′37″N 5°28′10″W	Category C(S)	18258	Upload Photo
Bridge-Keeper's Cottage At Swing Bridge, Crinan Canal, Near Lochgilphead				56°02′10″N 5°26′33″W	Category B	18247	Upload Photo
Stonefield Castle Policies, South Or Tarbert Gate Lodge				55°52′46″N 5°24′44″W	Category B	19145	Upload Photo
'Larkfield' Garvel Road				55°52′10″N 5°24′34″W	Category C(S)	18265	Upload Photo
St Cormac's Chapel, Eilean Mor				55°54′50″N 5°44′08″W	Category B	18273	Upload Photo
Kilberry Castle				55°48′57″N 5°39′36″W	Category B	18277	Upload Photo
Mcneill Campbell Of Kintarbert And Druimdrishaig Mausoleum, Kilnaish Burial Ground				55°47′41″N 5°33′15″W	Category B	18244	Upload Photo
Dunmore House				55°47′54″N 5°31′28″W	Category B	18245	Upload another image See more images
'Glendarroch' Robber's Den				56°01′26″N 5°26′55″W	Category B	18248	Upload Photo
Seacliff House, Including Coachman's House, Lochgilhead Rd				56°01′18″N 5°26′44″W	Category B	18249	Upload Photo
Attichuan House Tarbert Road				56°00′27″N 5°27′05″W	Category B	18253	Upload Photo
Leargnahension Bridge, By Tarbert				55°47′51″N 5°36′16″W	Category B	44925	Upload Photo
Walled Garden And Summer-Houses Beside Inverneil House				55°58′42″N 5°27′04″W	Category B	18256	Upload Photo
Stonefield Castle Hotel				55°53′28″N 5°25′01″W	Category B	18262	Upload Photo
'Lorne Villa', Garvel Road				55°52′09″N 5°24′35″W	Category B	18266	Upload Photo
Ormsary House				55°53′18″N 5°36′57″W	Category C(S)	18274	Upload Photo
Ardpatrick House				55°46′29″N 5°35′03″W	Category B	18282	Upload Photo
Kilberry, K6 Telephone Kiosk				55°49′00″N 5°38′59″W	Category B	18233	Upload Photo
Stables And Coachhouse, At Royal Hotel				56°01′04″N 5°26′56″W	Category C(S)	18251	Upload Photo
Stonefield Castle Policies, Tower				55°53′23″N 5°24′56″W	Category C(S)	19143	Upload Photo
Druimdrishaig Farm-House				55°52′34″N 5°37′35″W	Category B	18275	Upload Photo
Campbell Of Kilberry Mausoleum, Kilberry Estate				55°48′57″N 5°39′33″W	Category C(S)	18278	Upload Photo
Carse House				55°47′50″N 5°35′44″W	Category B	18280	Upload Photo
Fraser Campbell Of Dunmore Mausoleum, Dunmore Estate				55°47′56″N 5°31′41″W	Category C(S)	18246	Upload Photo
Ardrishaig Harbour				56°00′44″N 5°26′39″W	Category B	18252	Upload Photo
Gate-Piers, Ardpatrick Estate				55°46′35″N 5°34′52″W	Category C(S)	19869	Upload Photo
'Ardfinaig' Tarbert Road				56°00′16″N 5°27′02″W	Category C(S)	18254	Upload Photo
South Knapdale Parish Church, Achahoish				55°56′22″N 5°33′14″W	Category C(S)	18268	Upload Photo
Stables And Coachhouses, Stonefield Castle Policies				55°53′20″N 5°25′06″W	Category B	19868	Upload Photo
St Columba's Chapel, Cove, N Shore Of Loch Caolisport				55°55′52″N 5°36′05″W	Category C(S)	18269	Upload Photo
Mcmillan's Cross, Near St Malrubha's Chapel, Kilmory-Knap				55°54′50″N 5°40′41″W	Category B	18272	Upload Photo
Kilberry Church Of Scotland, Lergnahansion				55°47′53″N 5°36′21″W	Category B	18279	Upload Photo
Stonefield Castle Policies, Steading				55°53′04″N 5°25′19″W	Category C(S)	19146	Upload Photo
Stonefield Castle Policies, Gamekeeper's Cottage (Miss Gibson's)				55°53′00″N 5°25′19″W	Category C(S)	19147	Upload Photo
Campbell Of Inverneil Mausoleum, Inverneil Estate				55°58′32″N 5°27′59″W	Category B	18257	Upload Photo
Stronachullin Lodge				55°57′51″N 5°26′52″W	Category B	18259	Upload Photo
Tigh-An-Droighinn, Stronachullin				55°57′33″N 5°26′48″W	Category C(S)	18260	Upload Photo
Lorne Cottage, Garvel Road				55°52′09″N 5°24′37″W	Category C(S)	18267	Upload Photo
St Maelrubha's Chapel Kilmory-Knap				55°54′50″N 5°40′40″W	Category B	18271	Upload Photo
Carse Farm Steading				55°47′43″N 5°35′47″W	Category B	18281	Upload Photo
Victoria Hotel, Barmore Road				55°51′52″N 5°24′55″W	Category C(S)	18232	Upload Photo
Royal Hotel, Glenburn Rd				56°01′04″N 5°26′55″W	Category B	18250	Upload Photo
Ardrishaig, Pier Square, Former Passenger Terminal Building				56°00′48″N 5°26′45″W	Category C(S)	51097	Upload Photo
Church, Inverneil				55°58′29″N 5°26′55″W	Category C(S)	18255	Upload Photo
Erins House				55°55′24″N 5°25′34″W	Category B	18261	Upload Photo
Barmore Viaduct, Barmore Burn, Stonefield Castle Policies				55°53′22″N 5°24′58″W	Category B	18263	Upload Photo
Glenralloch Farm-House				55°52′10″N 5°26′09″W	Category C(S)	18264	Upload Photo
Ellary House				55°55′22″N 5°37′17″W	Category B	18270	Upload Photo
Druimdrishaig Farm Steading				55°52′34″N 5°37′38″W	Category B	18276	Upload Photo

== Key ==
The scheme for classifying buildings in Scotland is:

- Category A: "buildings of national or international importance, either architectural or historic; or fine, little-altered examples of some particular period, style or building type."
- Category B: "buildings of regional or more than local importance; or major examples of some particular period, style or building type, which may have been altered."
- Category C: "buildings of local importance; lesser examples of any period, style, or building type, as originally constructed or moderately altered; and simple traditional buildings which group well with other listed buildings."

In March 2016 there were 47,288 listed buildings in Scotland. Of these, 8% were Category A, and 50% were Category B, with the remaining 42% being Category C.

== See also ==
- List of listed buildings in Argyll and Bute
