= Glengilp distillery =

Whisky distillery in Argyll and Bute, Scotland

Glengilp distillery (also Glendarroch or Glenfyne)
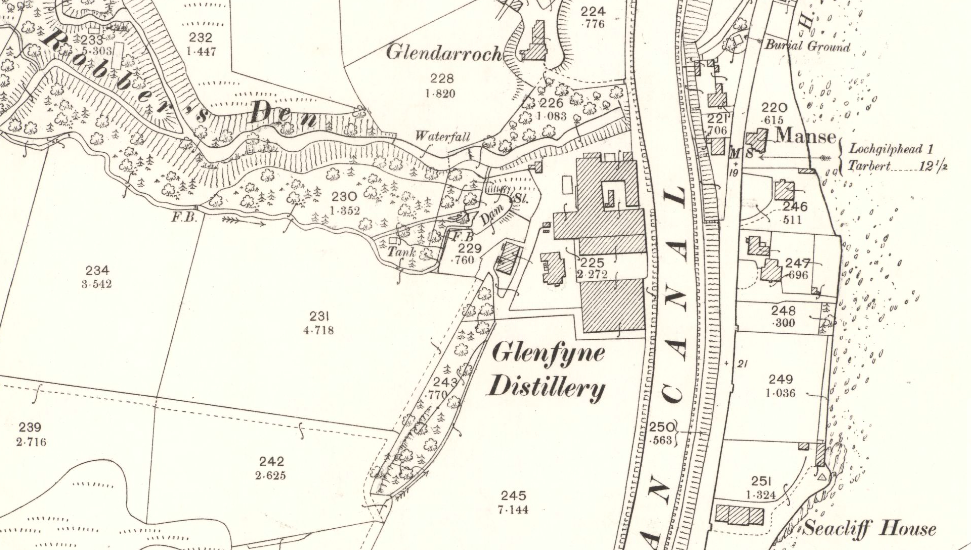
- Ordnance survey map showing it as the Glenfyne Distillery
- Location: Ardrishaig
- Founded: 1831
- Founder: Henry Hoey
- Status: Closed/demolished
- No. of stills: 3
- Capacity: 80,000 gallons per annum in 1886
- Mothballed: 1937
- Demolished: 1996

Glengilp distillery (also known as Glenfyne distillery and Glendarroch distillery) was a Highland single malt Scotch whisky distillery located on the banks of the Crinan Canal at Ardrishaig, Argyll and Bute in the west of Scotland.

== History ==
It was built in 1831 by Henry Hoey & Company. In 1852 it was taken over by Peter McNee & Co. Peter McNee died in 1855 and the distillery was offered for sale with the description that it was capable of producing 1,000 gallons of whisky per week.

From 1857 it was operated by John McGann, Thomas Taylor Hay, William Hay and William Hay junior trading as William Hay & Co. John McGann left the partnership in 1862. Thomas Taylor Hay left the partnership in 1865. William Hay left the business in 1869 and it was continued by William Hay junior. It was offered for sale in 1871 when it was stated that it was capable of producing 3,000 gallons of whisky per week.

It was purchased in 1873 by William Smyth & Co for £5,000 (equivalent to £559,600 in 2023) but in 1878 they were declared bankrupt. It reverted to Glengilp in 1879 when Kemp & Co took over operation. This business was dissolved in 1882 and William Gillies operated it from 1884 to 1887.

Around 1886 it was visited by Alfred Barnard who published a description of it in his book The Whisky Distilleries of the United Kingdom.

The Glendarroch Distillery covers three acres of ground, and is solidly built of stone in the form of a quadrangle, with a frontage of 500 feet (150 m) to the [Crinan] Canal … The annual output is 80,000 gallons.

In 1887 it was acquired by the Scotch Whisky Distillers Limited and renamed Glenfyne. This company ceased operation in 1889. It was offered for sale by the trustees of William Foulds’ estate in 1891 when it was said to have a capacity of 150,000 gallons.

It was acquired by Robertson & Baxter Ltd. in 1919 and licensed to the Glenfyne Distillery Co. The distillery closed in 1937, though its warehouses continued to be used for several years. The buildings were finally demolished in 1996 and houses were built on the site.
