= John Turnbull of Abbey St Bathans =

John Turnbull of Abbey St Bathans WS FRSE (1820–1891) was a 19th-century Scottish lawyer, landowner, archaeologist and naturalist.

== Life ==
John was born on 3 March 1820 at Abbey St Bathans House in the Scottish Borders, the son of Grace Brunton and her husband, George Turnbull of Abbey St Bathans. Around 1834 he was apprenticed as a lawyer in his father's office at 16 Thistle Street in Edinburgh's First New Town. He also undertook formal training in Scots law at the University of Edinburgh.

In 1841, following in his father's footsteps, John qualified as a Writer to the Signet and became a junior partner in his father's firm at Thistle Street, thereafter known as W & J Turnbull WS. He lived with his father at 49 George Square in the South Side. Following his father's death in 1855 he inherited both the legal office and the houses at George Square and Abbey St Bathans. He remodelled the latter extensively.

In the 1870s he was Convenor of the Highland and Agricultural Society. He was also a member of the Berwickshire Naturalists Club.

He was elected a Fellow of the Royal Society of Edinburgh in 1879. His proposers were Thomas Stevenson, David Smith, James Leslie and Peter Guthrie Tait.

He died on 21 June 1891.

His house in George Square was demolished in the 1960s to allow expansion of the University of Edinburgh.

== Family ==
He was unmarried and had no children.
