= Cairnbaan =

Coordinates: 56°03′38″N 5°28′26″W

Cairnbaan: Scottish Gaelic: An Càrn Bàn
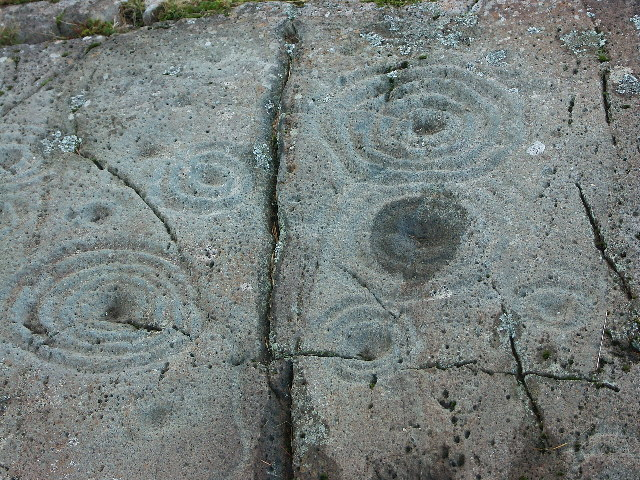
- Cup and ring marks on a stone near Cairnbaan

- Location within Argyll and Bute
- OS grid reference: NR830907
- Council area: Argyll and Bute
- Lieutenancy area: Argyll and Bute
- Country: Scotland
- Sovereign state: United Kingdom
- Post town: LOCHGILPHEAD
- Postcode district: PA31
- Police: Scotland
- Fire: Scottish
- Ambulance: Scottish
- UK Parliament: Argyll, Bute and South Lochaber
- Scottish Parliament: Argyll and Bute

Cairnbaan (Scottish Gaelic: An Càrn Bàn) is a village situated on the Crinan Canal, in Argyll and Bute, western Scotland.

Cairnbaan is about halfway between Ardrishaig on Loch Gilp at the canal's eastern end and Crinan on the Sound of Jura to the west. Its name, from Scottish Gaelic, means white hill or white cairn. On the hill above the village there are cup and ring marks dating from the Iron Age.

The Cairnbaan Hotel was built in about 1800 to cater for canal travellers. It was once a temperance hotel. It has featured in the television series The Tales of Para Handy, based on the novels of Neil Munro.
