= Loch a' Bharain =

Lake in Scotland

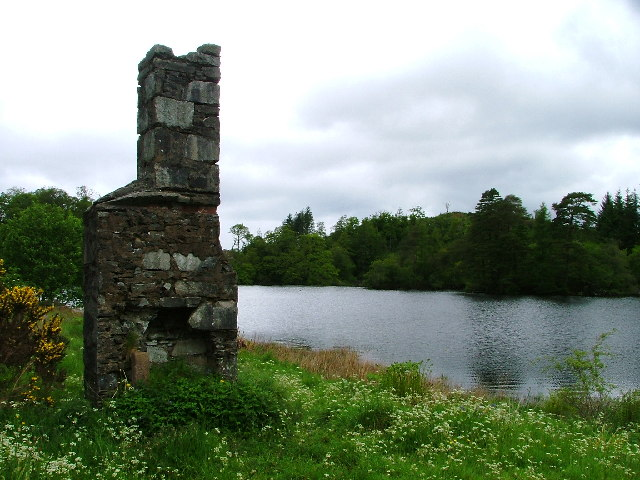
- Ruins next to Loch a' Bharain

- Location within Argyll and Bute
- Location: North Knapdale, Scotland
- Coordinates: 56.0624°N 5.4972°W grid reference NR82369116
- Type: Reservoir
- Basin countries: Scotland, United Kingdom
- Surface area: 34,000 m^{2} (370,000 sq ft)
- Water volume: 63,100 m^{3} (51.2 acre⋅ft)
- Surface elevation: 19 m (62 ft)

Scheduled monument
- Official name: Crinan Canal, Loch a' Bharain canal feeder
- Type: Industrial: inland water
- Designated: 4 September 1996
- Reference no.: SM6502

Loch a' Bharain (the Baron's Loch) is an impounding reservoir in Scotland.

Loch a' Bharain directly sits on the north bank of the Crinan Canal beside lock no.9, 1.5 kilometres (0.93 mi) west of Cairnbaan, and acts as a side pound to the summit reach: effectively increasing the area and therefore reducing the level changes caused by downward lockings at either end.

The earth-fill dam is 5.6 metres (18 ft) high and was constructed in 1801 during the construction of the Crinan Canal. Works were completed by 1810 and after further repair and inspection by 1815–1820 the Crinan canal helped bring jobs and industry to the area shortening what would be a longer voyage on boat to get to Crinan and other areas on the west coast. The 9 mile canal became known as a Royal Route when Queen Victoria sailed the canal after works completed, this was part of her tour of Scotland.

Loch á Bharain is one of the many many lochs (lakes) and burns (rivers) feeding the Crinan Canal. When the Crinan Canal was drained for repair and inspection in 2020–2021, Loch á Bharain was mostly drained, revealing old lock gates, tyres and other bits and pieces as well as the remains (floor plan) of the old castle of Clan MacTavish.

The loch is regularly used by Mid Argyll Radio Sailing for model boats.

== See also ==
- List of reservoirs and dams in the United Kingdom
