= List of listed buildings in Abbey St Bathans, Scottish Borders =

This is a list of listed buildings in the parish of Abbey St Bathans in the Scottish Borders, Scotland.

== List ==
Name	Location	Date listed	Grid ref. (Note: Sometimes known as OSGB36, the grid reference (where provided) is based on the British national grid reference system used by the Ordnance Survey. • "Guide to National Grid". Ordnance Survey. • "Get-a-map". Ordnance Survey.)	Geo-coordinates	Notes	LB number (Note: Historic Environment Scotland assign a unique alphanumeric identifier to each designated site in Scotland, for listed buildings this always begins with "LB", for example "LB12345".)	Image
Bankend Including Bankend Cottage, Outbuilding And Garden Walls				55°51′39″N 2°24′14″W	Category C(S)	44913	Upload Photo
The Old Manse Including Outbuilding, Coal Shed And Boundary Walls				55°51′08″N 2°23′14″W	Category B	44916	Upload Photo
1-6 (Inclusive Nos) The Square, Abbey St Bathans Including Cobbled Courtyard And Garden Walls				55°51′12″N 2°23′16″W	Category C(S)	44919	Upload Photo
The Retreat Including The Retreat Cottage, Walled Garden, Outbuilding And Sundial				55°50′27″N 2°21′58″W	Category A	1971	Upload another image
The Riverside, Abbey St Bathans Including Former Sawmill, Kennels, Railings, Cobbled Courtyard And Garden Wall				55°50′59″N 2°22′51″W	Category B	44918	Upload Photo
The Kennels, Abbey St Bathans Including Railings, Garden Wall And Front And Rear Courtyards				55°50′59″N 2°22′52″W	Category C(S)	44914	Upload Photo
Whareburn Cottage Including Garden Walls				55°51′11″N 2°22′39″W	Category C(S)	44922	Upload Photo
Abbey St Bathans Church (Church Of Scotland) Including Graveyard, Boundary Walls, Gatepiers And Gates				55°51′11″N 2°23′14″W	Category B	1970	Upload Photo
Abbey Farmhouse Including Dairy, Boundary Walls, Gatepiers And Gate				55°51′09″N 2°23′20″W	Category C(S)	44911	Upload Photo
Abbey St Bathans House Including Boundary Walls, Railings, Gateposts And Gates				55°51′35″N 2°24′11″W	Category B	44912	Upload Photo
Quixwood Farmhouse Including Walled Garden, Boundary Walls, Gatepiers And Gates				55°51′41″N 2°20′30″W	Category C(S)	44917	Upload Photo
Stables And Former Groom's Cottage, Abbey St Bathans Including Front And Rear Cobbled Courtyards				55°50′59″N 2°22′53″W	Category B	44920	Upload Photo
The Lodge, Abbey St Bathans Including Boundary Wall, Gatepiers And Railings				55°50′59″N 2°22′55″W	Category C(S)	44915	Upload Photo
Weirburn House Including Boundary Walls				55°51′05″N 2°22′46″W	Category C(S)	44921	Upload Photo

== Key ==
The scheme for classifying buildings in Scotland is:

- Category A: "buildings of national or international importance, either architectural or historic; or fine, little-altered examples of some particular period, style or building type."
- Category B: "buildings of regional or more than local importance; or major examples of some particular period, style or building type, which may have been altered."
- Category C: "buildings of local importance; lesser examples of any period, style, or building type, as originally constructed or moderately altered; and simple traditional buildings which group well with other listed buildings."

In March 2016 there were 47,288 listed buildings in Scotland. Of these, 8% were Category A, and 50% were Category B, with the remaining 42% being Category C.
