= George Turnbull of Abbey St Bathans =

Scottish lawyer

George Turnbull of Abbey St Bathans WS FRSE (27 January 1793 – 27 February 1855) was a 19th-century Scottish lawyer, landowner and agricultural improver.

== Life ==
Turnbull was born in 1793 at Abbey St Bathans in the Scottish Borders. His father, originally referred to as John Turnbull of Duns, had purchased Abbey St Bathans House from John Hume in 1786. Around 1790 he married Margaret Christie.

Around 1806, he was apprenticed to John Renton WS, an Edinburgh lawyer working from 4 North St James Street. In 1807 his father died and he inherited Abbey St Bathans, making major alterations to the house.

In 1816 Turnbull qualified as a Writer to the Signet and set up his own legal office in Edinburgh at 16 Charlotte Street. By the 1830s he had an office at 16 Thistle Street in the New Town but was living separately at a fine townhouse at 49 George Square in the South Side. In 1841 his son qualified as a Writer to the Signet and joined him in the firm at Thistle Street creating "W & J Turnbull WS".

He was elected a Fellow of the Royal Society of Edinburgh in 1846. His proposer was John Cockburn.

He retained both his George Square house and Abbey St Bathans until death.

He died at George Square on 27 February 1855. His last will and testament are held at the National Archive in Kew.

His house in Edinburgh was demolished in the 1960s to allow expansion of the University of Edinburgh.

== Family ==
In August 1817, he was married to Grace Brunton, youngest daughter of James Brunton of Lugton. Their children (at least five) included John Turnbull (1820-1891).
