= George Square, Edinburgh =

Square in Edinburgh, Scotland

Coordinates: 55.9437°N 3.189°W

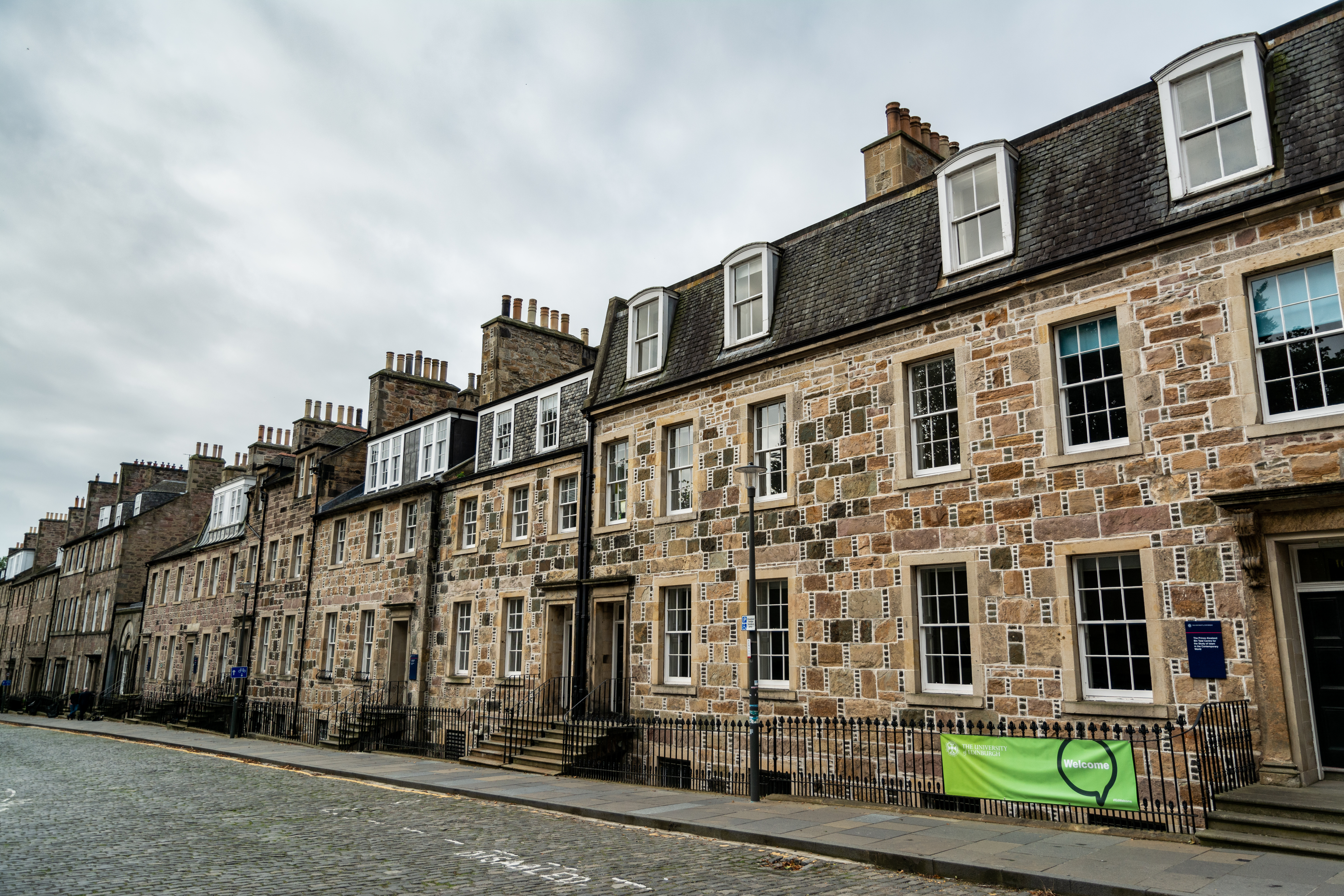
Numbers 16 (right) to 23, George Square

George Square and the Old College at sunrise

George Square (Scottish Gaelic: Ceàrnag Sheòrais) is a city square in Edinburgh, Scotland. It is in the south of the city centre, adjacent to the Meadows. It was laid out in 1766 outside the overcrowded Old Town, and was a popular residential area for Edinburgh's better-off citizens. In the 1960s, much of the square was redeveloped by the University of Edinburgh, although the Cockburn Association and the Georgian Group of Edinburgh protested. Most but not all buildings on the square now belong to the university (among the exceptions being the Dominican priory of St Albert the Great). Principal buildings include the Gordon Aikman Lecture Theatre, Edinburgh University Library, 40 George Square and Appleton Tower.

== Georgian square ==
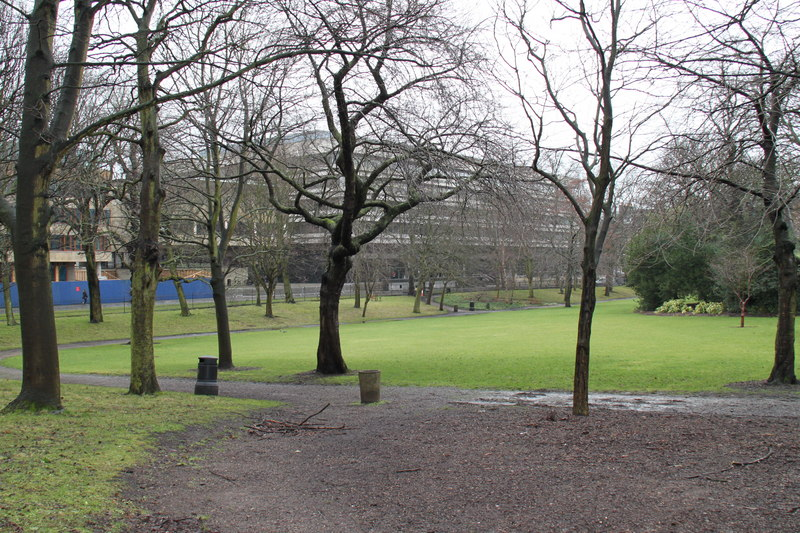
Gardens in George Square, with the university library in the background

The square was laid out in 1766 by the builder James Brown, and comprised modest, typically Georgian, terraced houses. Away from the overcrowded Old Town, George Square was the location of the homes of lawyers and nobles. Residents included Sir Walter Scott, the judge Lord Braxfield, and the politician Henry Dundas, 1st Viscount Melville. In June 1792, the square was the starting point of the Dundas Riots, aimed at the house of the Lord advocate, Robert Dundas of Arniston, who lived on the square. From 1876 to 1880, Arthur Conan Doyle, later author of the Sherlock Holmes novels, lived at No. 23 while studying medicine at the University of Edinburgh Medical School.

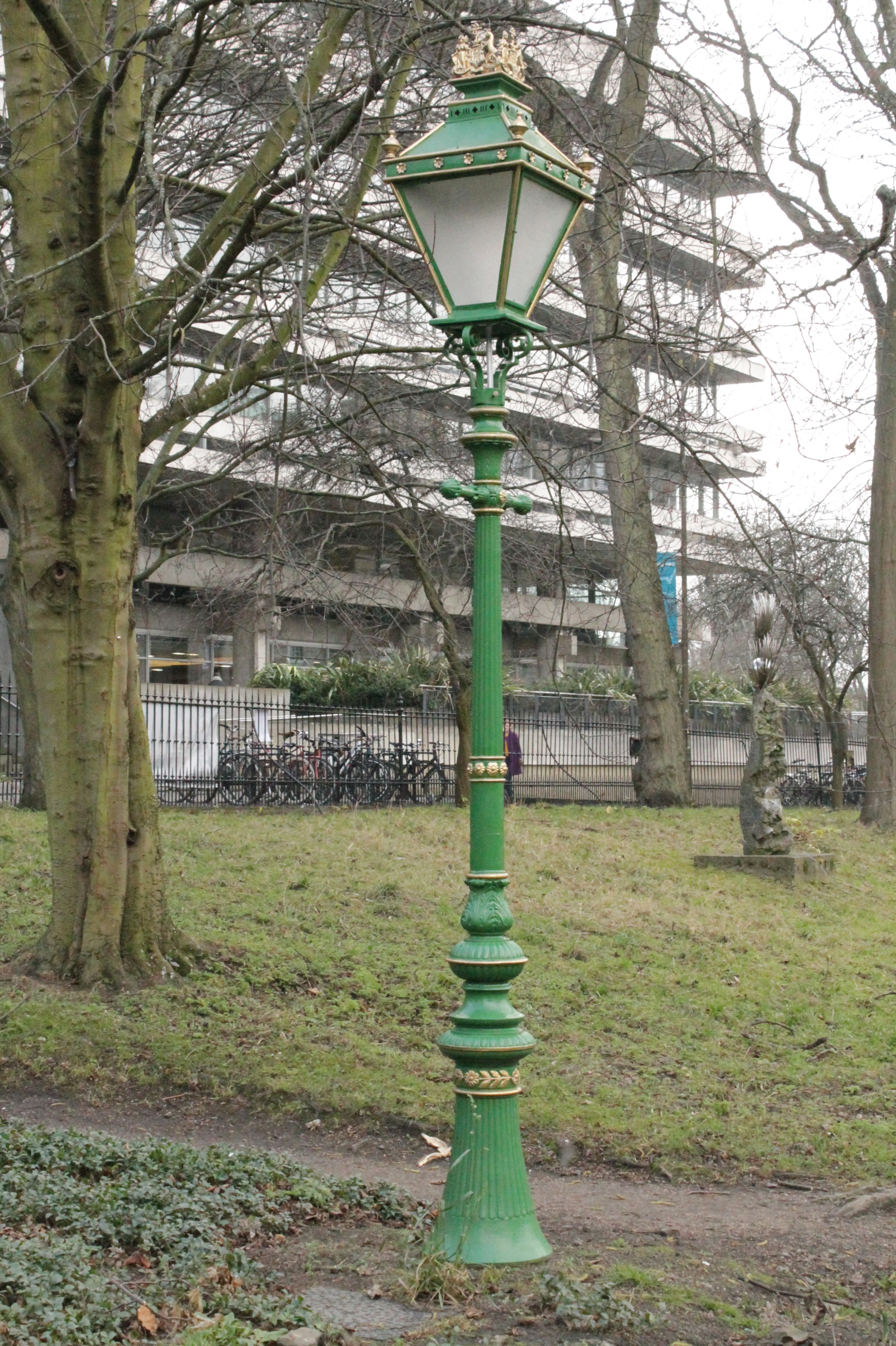
A Baillie lamp in George Square, Edinburgh

Redevelopment of the square began in the late 19th century when numbers 4 to 7 were redeveloped as George Watson's Ladies College. In the 1920s the college expanded to absorb numbers 8 to 10. These minor interventions were mild in comparison with the changes of the 1960s: the whole south side was demolished, together with half the east side, to provide new facilities for the university. Combined with the redevelopments on Potterow to the north-east and completion of McEwan Hall, this made George Square the new hub of the whole university.

== Gardens ==
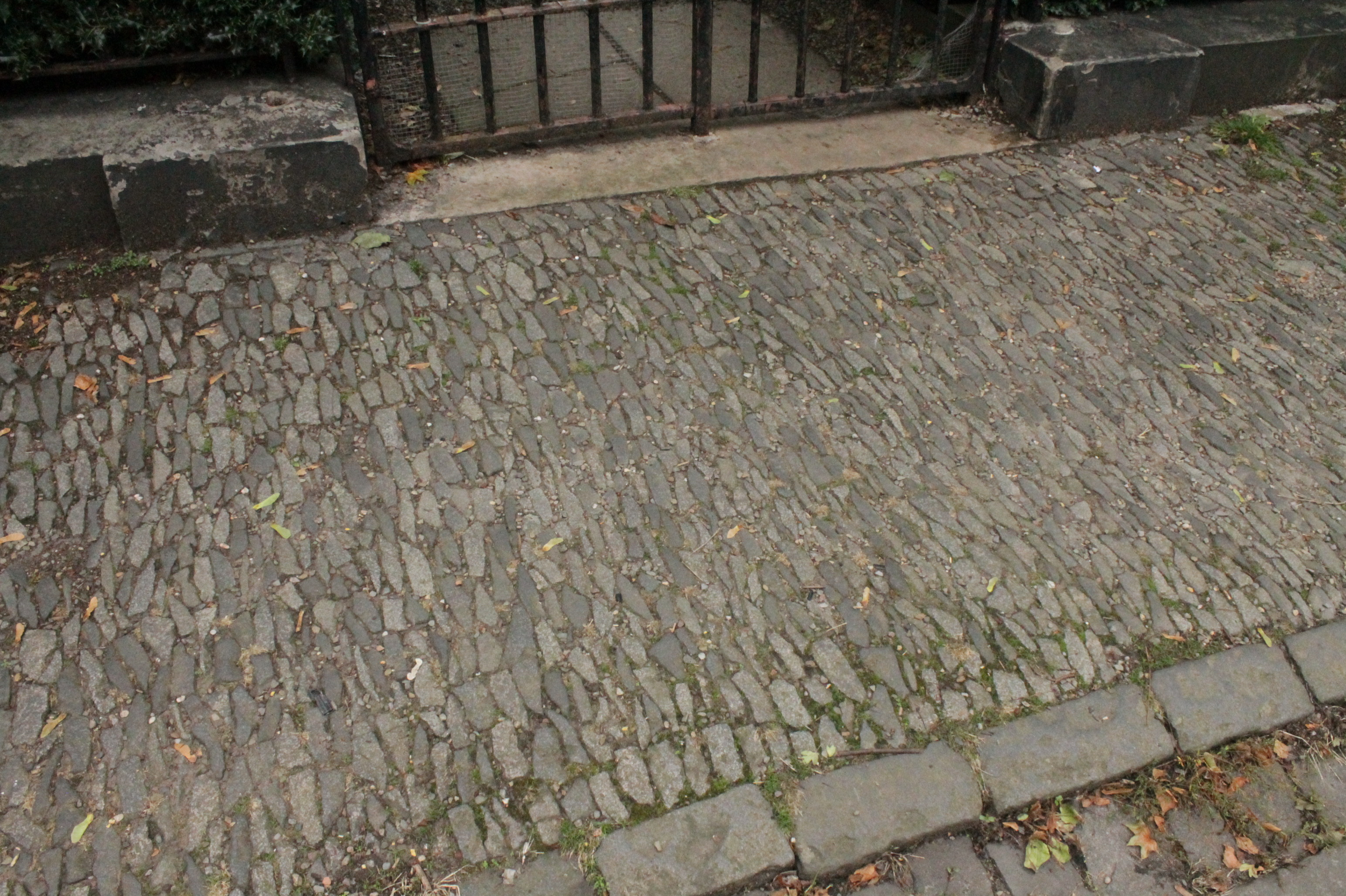
Horonised pavement, Moray Place

The central gardens are privately owned and are not a public park as such. However, they are usually available to public use, though only the southern access is usually open.

The central gardens contain a memorial to Winifred Rushforth entitled "The Dreamer".

The garden also contains several "Baillie lamps", which were formerly placed in front of the Edinburgh Baillies and latterly (until the 1970s) placed in front of councillors' houses.

The pavements adjoining the central garden are "horonised": a system of using vertical slivers of granite remaining from the squaring of the granite setts on the main road surface, thereby having no wasted material.

== Famous residents ==
- Dionysius Wielobycki (at number 3)
- Rev John Jamieson (4)
- Allan Maconochie, Lord Meadowbank (5)
- Henry Dundas Lord Melville and Elizabeth Rannie (5)
- Richard Huie (8)
- John Campbell, Lord Stonefield (11)
- Rev John Paul and his son James Balfour Paul (13)
- Waller Hugh Paton (14)
- John Struthers (anatomist) (15)
- Rev William King Tweedie (15) plus a short time at (50)
- Very Rev Patrick Clason (22)
- Simon Somerville Laurie (22)
- Jane Welsh Carlyle (23)
- Sir Arthur Conan Doyle (23)
- Sir Walter Scott (25)
- Sir Adam Ferguson (27)
- Robert Kaye Greville (31/33)
- Joseph Noel Paton (33)
- Charles Lawson (nurseryman) (35)
- Dawson Turner (radiologist) (37)
- Dr Andrew Fyfe (38)
- William Archer Porter Tait (38)
- Percy Portsmouth (39)
- Alexander Adam (39)
- Very Rev John Inglis (43)
- Hugh Cameron RSA RSW (45)
- Edmund Taylor Whittaker (48)
- George Turnbull of Abbey St Bathans and his son John (49)
- Gerard Baldwin Brown (50)
- James Dalgleish Hamilton Jamieson (52)
- Robert Dundas of Arniston (57)
- Charles Maclaren (58)
- Thomas M'Crie the Younger (58) earlier at (45)

33 George Square was used as the base for HM Geological Survey of Scotland with notable employees including John Horne.

Other residents (whose exact addresses are unclear) include Henry Erskine, Robert McQueen, Lord Braxfield (north side), William Craig, Lord Craig (west side), John Campbell, Lord Stonefield (north side) and Admiral Duncan of Camperdown.

== Redevelopment ==
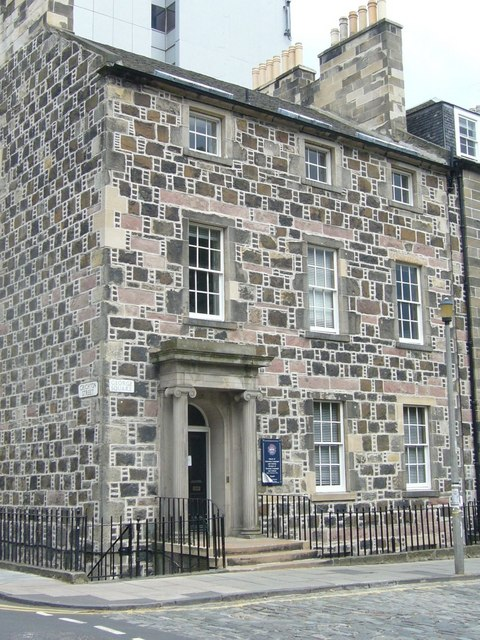
A Georgian house at the north-east corner of the square

The University of Edinburgh began drawing up plans to redevelop the square in the 1950s. Architects Basil Spence and Robert Matthew were closely involved in the plans. Opposition to demolition of the Georgian Square was led by the Cockburn Association, and the Georgian Group of Edinburgh, which was established by Colin McWilliam and others to resist the proposals. In the end, the western side of the square was retained. This was helped by the refusal of the Dominican Order who owned 23 and 24 George Square to sell their premises to the university, despite the offer to build a replacement church and priory. Fr Anthony Ross O.P. was instrumental in this refusal. On the northern side, the 19th century George Watson's Ladies College was retained alongside the modern Hugh Robson Building. Georgian terraces were retained along half of the east side, while the southern side was entirely redeveloped.

Today, George Square has the highest concentration of university buildings in its Central campus area, which includes the Brutalist Gordon Aikman Lecture Theatre, the university's main library, and the Appleton Tower and 40 George Square teaching and administrative buildings.

== Edinburgh Fringe ==
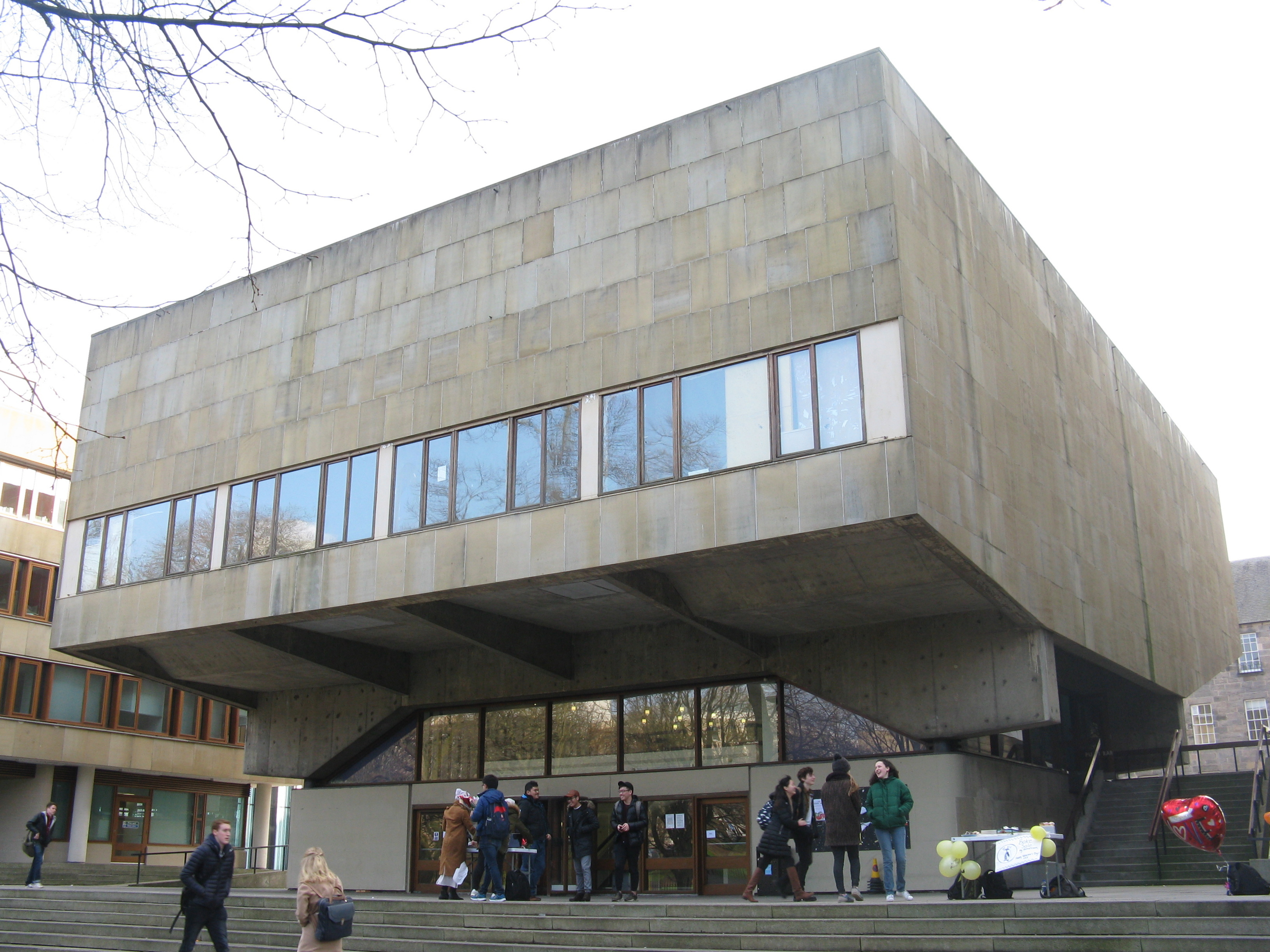
Gordon Aikman Lecture Theatre in George Square.

During August each year, the square becomes an important hub for events during the Edinburgh Festival Fringe. Many of the university buildings, notably Gordon Aikman Lecture Theatre and various lecture halls and classrooms are converted for use as venues by operator Assembly. The gardens are filled with bars, food stalls and pop-up venues, including, in recent years while nearby Bristo Square is being renovated, the Underbelly purple cow venue.

== Bibliography ==
- Historic Environment Scotland. "Edinburgh, George Square, General (Site no. NT27SE 1792)".
- "George Square". Edinburgh World Heritage.
- Greenwood Tree, "George and Charlotte, The Old Squares", in Thomson, David Cleghorn (ed.), Saltire Review, Vol. 6, No. 22, The Saltire Society, Edinburgh, pp. 9 - 14
- Robertson, Eleanor (1997). "The Story of the Society" (PDF). Architectural Heritage Society of Scotland. Archived from the original (PDF) on 18 July 2011.
- "George Square". Gazetteer for Scotland.
