= John Campbell, Lord Stonefield =

Scottish lawyer and Senator of the College of Justice

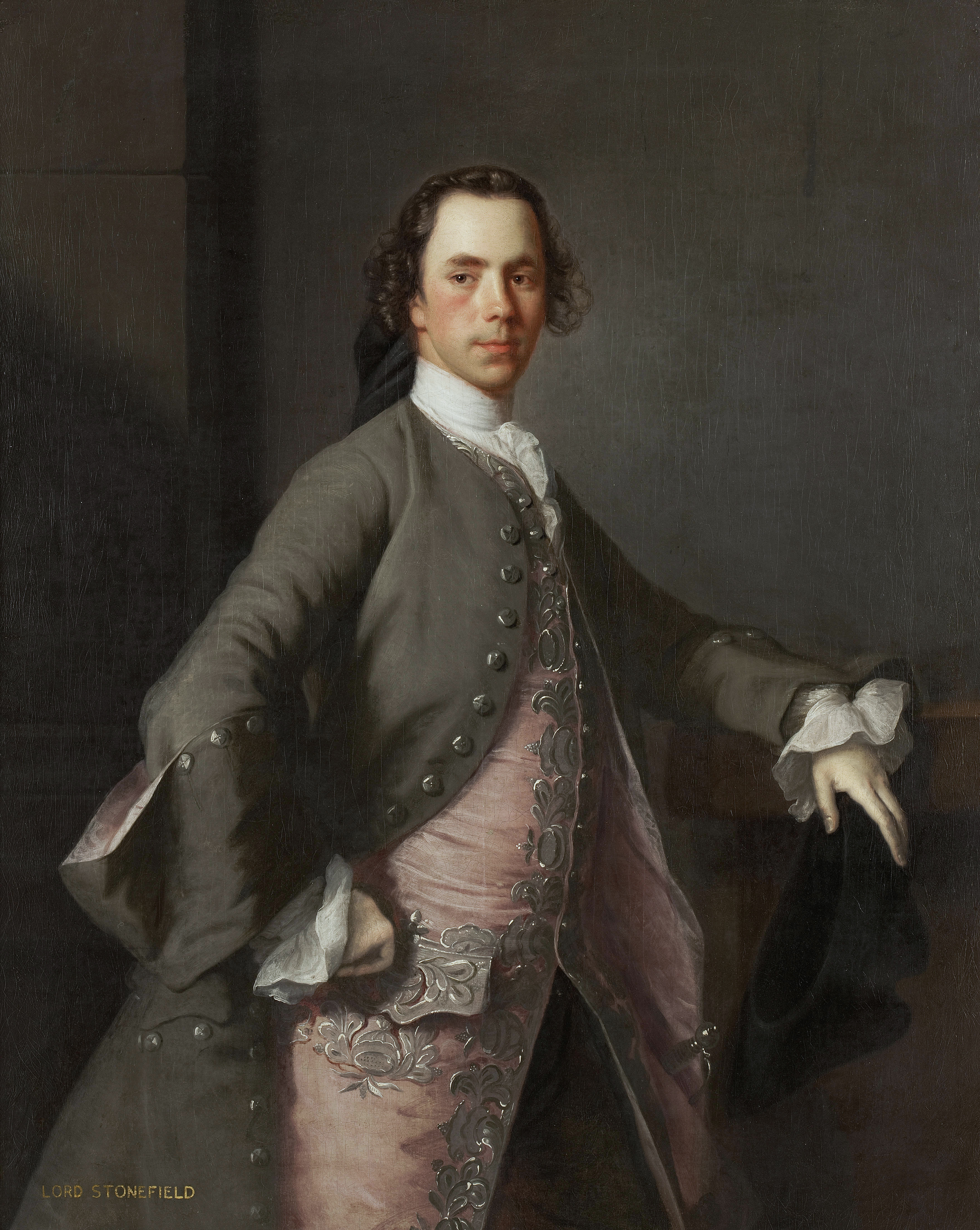
John Campbell Lord Stonefield in 1749

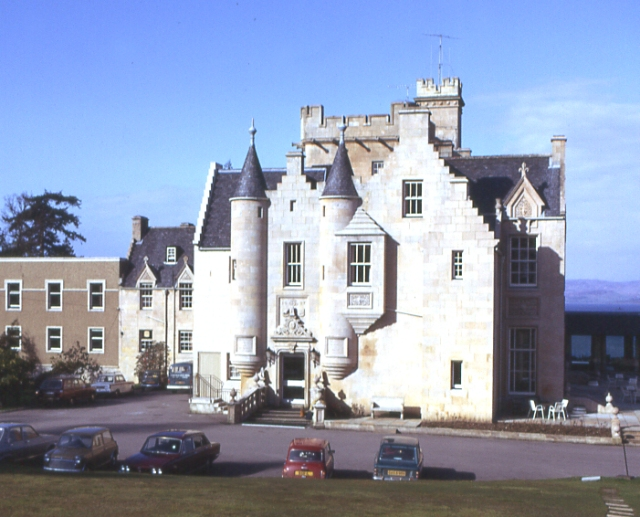
Stonefield Castle

The Hon John Campbell, Lord Stonefield FRSE (c. 1720–1801) was an 18th-century Scottish lawyer who rose to be a Senator of the College of Justice.

== Life ==
He was born around 1720 the son of Mrs Jane Ogilvie or Ogilvy (née Frend, Freend or Friend) (1701-1771). Her husband at that time was Cpt Alexander Ogilvy of Forglen. Cpt Ogilvy (b.1687) was the son of Sir Alexander Ogilvy, 1st Baronet of Forglen. However other sources give Captain Ogilvy's father as Alexander Campbell of Stonefield (implying illegitimacy). Captain Ogilvy died "before" 1727. The absence of mention of this in John's later records suggests that John too was illegitimate. But he was presumably originally named John Ogilvy. His mother Jane was the daughter of Benjamin Frend and was of Irish descent. The connection to Sir Alexander Ogilvy would make him the illegitimate half-brother of Sir Alexander Ogilvy, 7th Lord Banff.

In 1732 his mother (certainly widowed but perhaps also disgraced) married Archibald Campbell (1697-1777) of Stonefield in Argyllshire. If the second source of Captain Ogilvy's fatherhood is correct this would mean she married her husband's half-brother. If young John was indeed the son of Alexander Campbell, this complicated relationship would make him half-brother of his own (adoptive) father. As a third, and perhaps more logical conclusion, Archibald was perhaps truly the biological father of John, but conceived very young and definitely out of wedlock. Either way, Archibald Campbell appears to have raised John as his own son, and his presumed birth-name of John Ogilvy disappears and is deliberately obscured. Archibald was a lawyer who became Sheriff of Argyllshire.

John trained as a lawyer and passed the Scottish bar as an advocate in 1748. In 1753 he became Sheriff of Forfarshire.

In 1756 he bought Elphinstone Court in Edinburgh, the home of the late Peter Wedderburn, Lord Chesterhall, whose son Alexander had inherited the property but had no use for it, as he worked in London.

In 1763 he became a Senator of the College of Justice on the death of Charles Erskine, Lord Tinwald. He served this role for 38 years, one of the longest serving Senators.

Around 1765/1770 (on its initial construction) he moved to George Square on the south side of Edinburgh.

in 1783 he was a founding Fellow of the Royal Society of Edinburgh. In 1784 he became Director of the Highland Society. In 1787 he became a Lord of the Justiciary.

He died at 11 George Square, Edinburgh on 19 June 1801.

Following his death his place as Senator was filled by Alexander Fraser Tytler, Lord Woodhouselee.

His obituary in The Scots Magazine, 01 Jun 1801, p73 reads: DIED. 19. At Edinburgh, the Hon. John Campbell of Stonefield, one of the Senators of the College of Justice. Lord Stonefield sat as one of the Judge of the Court of Session exactly thirty-nine years, having been appointed to the Bench on 16 June 1762. He succeeded Lord Tinwald, who was named one of the Judge in 1744, on the decease of Lord Royston, the latter having been appointed so far back as the 1710. These three Judges, therefore, sat on the Bench in succession to each other upwards of ninety years. Lord Stonefield was for some time one of the Lords of Justiciary, but he resigned that situation a considerable time ago.

== Family ==
Around 1750 he was married to Grace Stuart (1725-1783), sister of John Stuart, 3rd Earl of Bute. Their children included Lt Col John Campbell of Stonefield and Col Colin Campbell of Stonefield (d.1839).

In 1791, following Grace's death, he married Miss Phoebe Lloyd (c. 1756-29 Sep 1818), who was buried at St George's Hanover Square in London.

== Artistic recognition ==
He was portrayed by Allan Ramsay in 1849.

He was portrayed by David Martin around 1770.

He was portrayed in later life by John Kay in 1799.
