= Crinan, Argyll =

Village in Argyll and Bute, Scotland

Coordinates: 56.090766°N 5.5583760°W

Crinan: Scottish Gaelic: An Crìonan
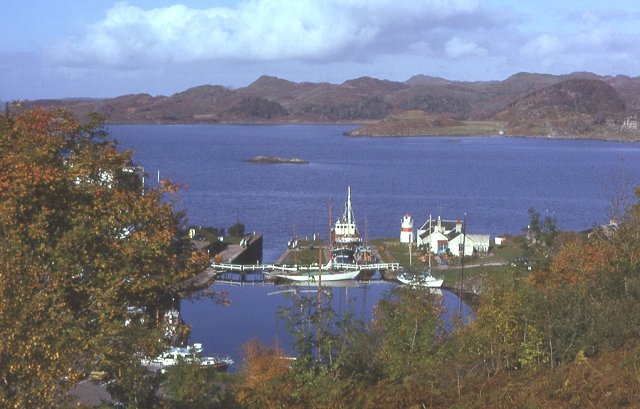
- Looking out to Loch Crinan over the small inner harbour of Crinan Village.

- Location within Argyll and Bute
- OS grid reference: NR 78738 94372
- Council area: Argyll and Bute
- Lieutenancy area: Argyll and Bute
- Country: Scotland
- Sovereign state: United Kingdom
- Post town: Lochgilphead
- Postcode district: PA31
- Dialling code: 01546
- UK Parliament: Argyll, Bute and South Lochaber
- Scottish Parliament: Argyll and Bute

Crinan (Scottish Gaelic: An Crìonan) is a small village located on the west coast of Scotland in the region known as Knapdale, which is part of Argyll and Bute. Before the Crinan Canal was built, Crinan was named Port Righ which meant the king's port. The canal was named from the small settlement of Crinan Ferry on the edge of Loch Crinan where a small ferry landed. The name Crinan probably derives from the Creones tribe who lived in the area in 140 AD. The canal starts at Ardrishaig sea loch on Loch Gilp, and ends nine miles (fourteen kilometres) away at Crinan sea loch on the Sound of Jura. The canal was designed to provide a short cut between the west coast and islands at one end and the Clyde estuary at the other, and so avoid the long voyage around the south end of the Kintyre Peninsula.

By the canal basin is a coffee shop and the nearby hotel and looks out across Loch Crinan to Duntrune Castle. Crinan Post Office is in the old Harbour House. Crinan Boatyard provides services and facilities for commercial and leisure boaters. A scallop farming business operates from the loch. The 35-hectare (86-acre) Crinan Wood is home to ferns, lichens and 24 species of bird.

Parts of the TV series The Tales of Para Handy were filmed here.

Named after Loch Crinan, Crinanite was a varietal name for the rock type analcime olivine dolerite or gabbro. It is composed essentially of olivine, titanaugite (pyroxene) and labradorite (feldspar) with minor analcime. The term encapsulated a suite of northwest-trending analcime dolerite dykes which are quite extensive in Argyllshire, centred on Loch Crinan.
