= Lochgilphead High School =

Secondary school in Argyll and Bute, Scotland

Coordinates: 56.039°N 5.425°W

Lochgilphead High School in Lochgilphead, Argyll is a secondary school servicing around 500-700 students. A new campus has been built in 2007 incorporating Lochgilphead High School, Lochgilphead Primary School and the White Gates Learning Centre. The roof of the incorporated sports centre was blown off by fast winds shortly after completion, and the main entrance door blew in due to fast winds and stormy weather. The £17,000,000 Lochgilphead Joint Campus Construction began in 2004 and was complete in October 2007 then it was officially opened in May 2008. The Building turned 14 years old in October 2021, in October 2022 the building will turn 15 years old which is halfway through the lifespan that these buildings are given.
