= Argyll and Bute Hospital =

- NHS Highland
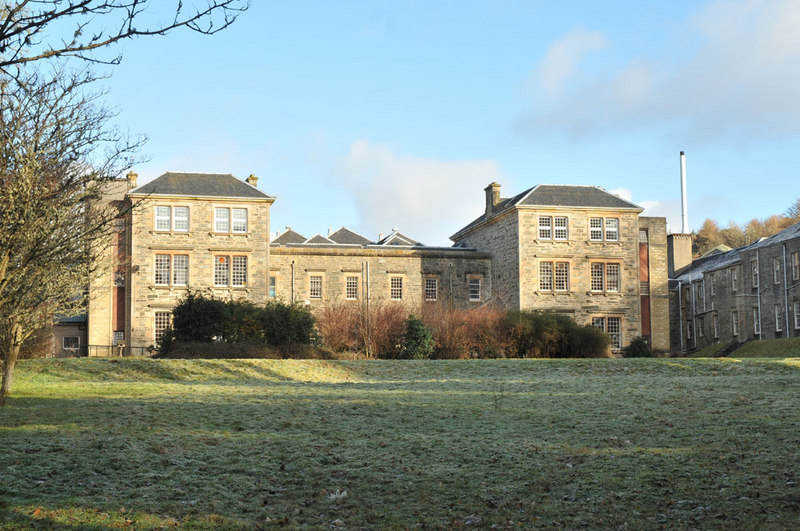
- Argyll and Bute Hospital

- Shown in Argyll and Bute

Geography
- Location: Lochgilphead, Argyll and Bute, Scotland
- Coordinates: 56.0418°N 5.4178°W

Organisation
- Care system: NHS Scotland
- Type: Psychiatric hospital

Services
- Emergency department: No

History
- Founded: 1863
- Closed: 2017

Links
- Lists: Hospitals in Scotland

Argyll and Bute Hospital was a mental health facility in Lochgilphead, Scotland. The original building (sometimes referred to as the West House) is a Grade C listed building. The hospital is managed by NHS Highland.

== History ==
The hospital, which was designed by David Cousin, opened as the Argyll District Asylum in 1863. It became the Argyll and Bute District Asylum in 1868. A new block, designed by Peddie & Kinnear, (sometimes referred to as the East House) was added in 1883 and, after joining the National Health Service as the Argyll and Bute Hospital in 1948, a new 30-bed extension was added and officially opened by the Duchess of Kent in 1971. After the introduction of Care in the Community in the early 1980s, the hospital went into a period of decline and was closed to inpatients in 2016. The hospital closed permanently in 2017. Although a Grade C listed property, the buildings are no longer maintained and in 2020 the 'East House', being unsafe, was demolished.
