= Stonefield Castle =

- Stonefield, Argyll, Scotland
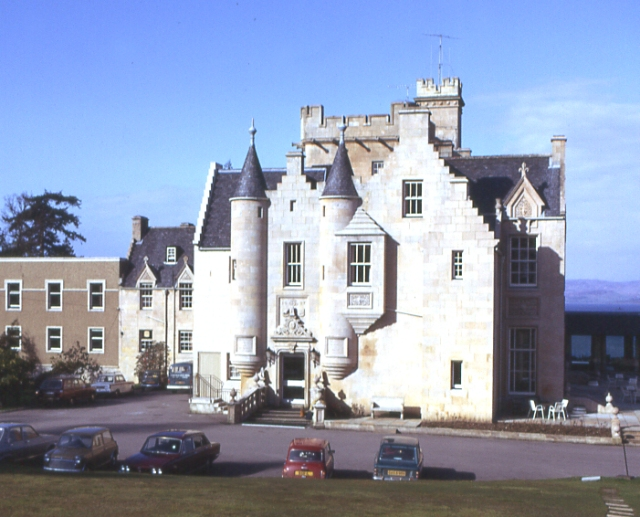

Location
- Location of Stonefield Castle in Argyll and Bute
- Coordinates: 55.891389°N 5.416111°W

Designations

Inventory of Gardens and Designed Landscapes in Scotland
- Official name: Stonefield Castle Hotel
- Designated: 30 June 1987
- Reference no.: GDL00350

Stonefield Castle is a Scottish baronial manor house near the village of Stonefield, north of Tarbert, Argyll & Bute, Scotland. It was built on the site of an earlier building, known as Barmore, and has been in use as a hotel since 1950.

== History ==
The original house of Barmore was constructed by the MacAlister family, who held nearby Tarbert Castle as tenants of the Duke of Argyll. They built the new house in the early 18th century, as the castle was deteriorating, though this led to a lawsuit in 1762 brought by the Duke against the MacAlister laird for neglect. Prior to this, Archibald Campbell, Sheriff of Argyll, had purchased the Barmore estate from Archibald MacAlister of Tarback in 1746.

The present castle was commissioned by John Campbell (1788-1857), grandson of John Campbell, Lord Stonefield (1720–1801), and designed by Edinburgh architect William Henry Playfair. It was completed in 1837, replacing the earlier Barmore. Playfair designed a number of buildings in the grounds, including bridges and a folly, and may have advised on the layout of the gardens. Campbell planted a number of species of Rhododendron and Magnolia, using seeds recently acquired on botanical expeditions by Archibald Campbell (his cousin) and Joseph Dalton Hooker in 1850. The plant collections were maintained and enhanced by later generations of Campbells, who also had gardens at Achnacloich near Connel. In 1948 the Campbells sold Stonefield, and it opened as a hotel in 1950.

The castle is a category B listed building. The grounds of the house are included in the Inventory of Gardens and Designed Landscapes, as an "important example of a 'west coast' woodland estate landscape" of national importance, with an outstanding plant collection.
