= Ardrishaig =

Village in Argyll and Bute, Scotland

Coordinates: 56.010917°N 5.4500420°W

Ardrishaig: Scottish Gaelic: Àird Driseig
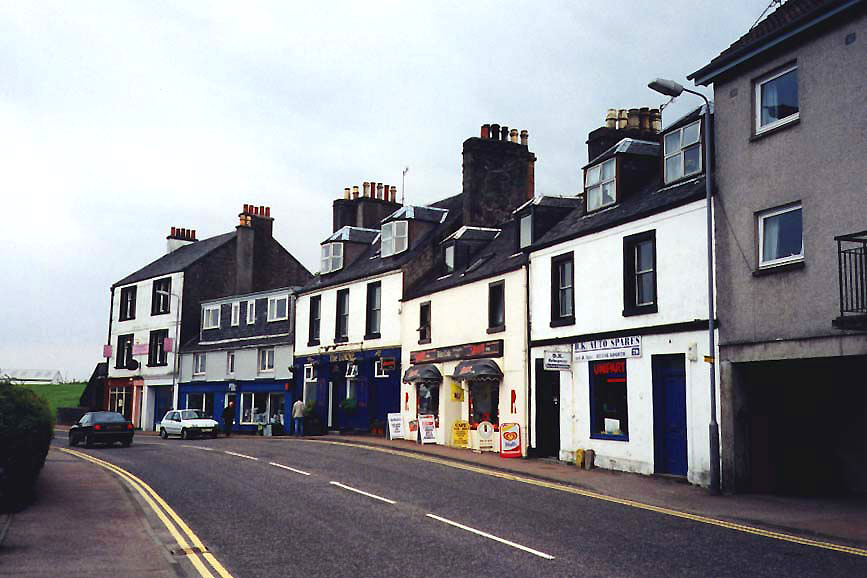
- Chalmers Street, the high street through the village

- Location within Argyll and Bute
- Population: 1,220 (2020)
- OS grid reference: NR 85030 85148
- Council area: Argyll and Bute
- Lieutenancy area: Argyll and Bute
- Country: Scotland
- Sovereign state: United Kingdom
- Post town: LOCHGILPHEAD
- Postcode district: PA30
- Dialling code: 01546
- Police: Scotland
- Fire: Scottish
- Ambulance: Scottish
- UK Parliament: Argyll, Bute and South Lochaber
- Scottish Parliament: Argyll and Bute

Ardrishaig /ɑːrˈdrɪʃɪɡ/ (Scottish Gaelic: Àird Driseig) is a coastal village on Loch Gilp, at the southern (eastern) entrance to the Crinan Canal in Argyll and Bute in the west of Scotland. It lies immediately to the south of Lochgilphead, with the nearest larger town being Oban.

== History ==
Àird Driseig or Rubha Àird Driseig, the Scottish Gaelic versions of the name, mean "height of the small bramble" or "promontory of the small bramble".

Ardrishaig harbour's first pier was built in 1873.

In the 1970s, the village was significantly altered when a row of old houses and shops on the lochside of the main street was demolished to make way for a car park. Most trading now takes place in the neighbouring town Lochgilphead.

The village was a filming location for the television series A Mug's Game.

== Governance ==
Ardrishaig historically fell within the South Knapdale parish, and is now served by Ardrishaig Community Council. It has been administered since 1996 by Argyll and Bute Council, falling within the Mid Argyll ward, which is represented by three councillors. The Scottish Parliament constituency is Argyll and Bute, which is represented by Jenni Minto. The UK Parliament constituency is Argyll, Bute and South Lochaber, which is represented by Brendan O'Hara.

== Geography ==
Ardrishaig lies on the side of a hill (the Cruach nam Bonnach face of Cruach Breacain) bordering the west side of Loch Gilp, just north of where it joins Loch Fyne. The linear settlement stretches southwards along the A83 (Chalmers Street) from around 0.6 kilometres (0.4 miles) south of the junction with the A816, on the southwest side of Lochgilphead. The Crinan Canal runs north–south through Ardrishaig, with locks and a basin at its southern terminus.

Ardrishaig Community Council is part-owner of the wind farm at Allt Dearg on the hill above Inverneill to the south of the town.

== Demography ==
Ardrishaig had 1,283 inhabitants in 2001.

== Landmarks ==
=== Crinan Canal and harbour ===
There are two piers, a lighthouse, slipway and breakwater along the seafront. Scottish Canals has an office by the canal basin. To the north side of the old pier is the Crinan Canal sea lock and to the south are pontoons and anchorage for boats. About 30,000 tonnes of timber pass through the harbour annually but it has the capacity for 150,000 tonnes.

=== Other landmarks ===
Facilities in the village include a hotel, public houses, a church, school, post office and antiques shops. There are two public telephone boxes and a public lavatory.

== Education ==
Ardrishaig Primary School is located in the village, and serves the area between Erins and Millers Bridge. The present building dates from 1986. For secondary education, the village falls within the catchment area of Lochgilphead Joint Campus.

== Notable people ==
John Smith, former Labour MP and Leader of the Opposition, was born in Ardrishaig.

James Chalmers, pioneering missionary, was born and lived in Ardrishaig until he was seven years old.

Sir St Clair Thomson, Surgeon and grandson of John Sinclair of Lochaline, educated at the village school at Ardrishaig until he was ten years old.

== See also ==
- Ardkinglas Railway
- Glenfyne/Glendarroch/Glengilp distillery
- List of listed buildings in South Knapdale, Argyll and Bute
- List of places in Argyll and Bute
