= Lochgilphead =

Coordinates: 56.038292°N 5.4323450°W

Lochgilphead: Scottish Gaelic: Ceann Loch Gilb
- Town and administrative centre
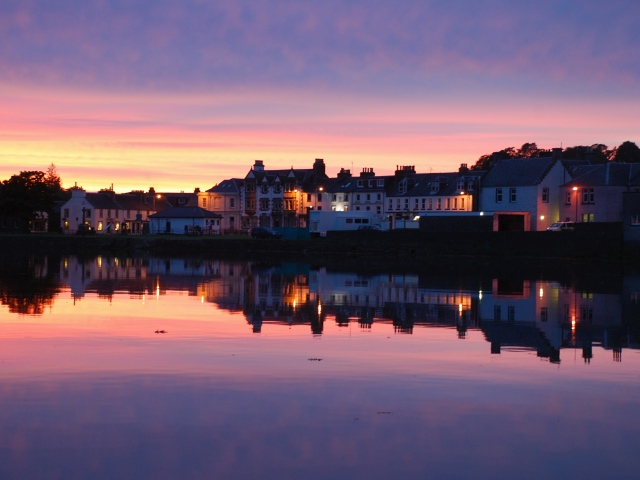
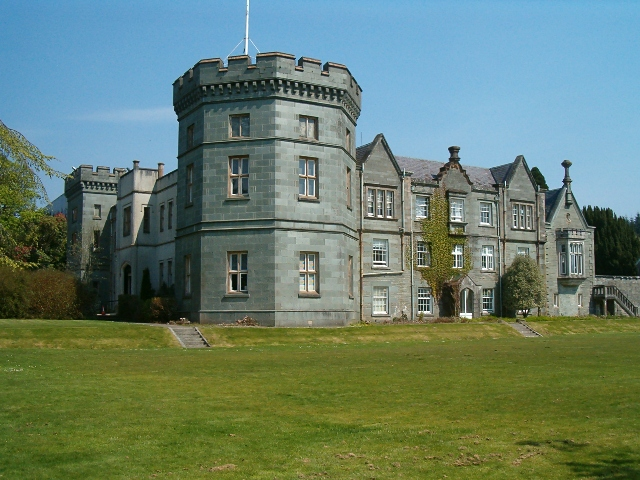
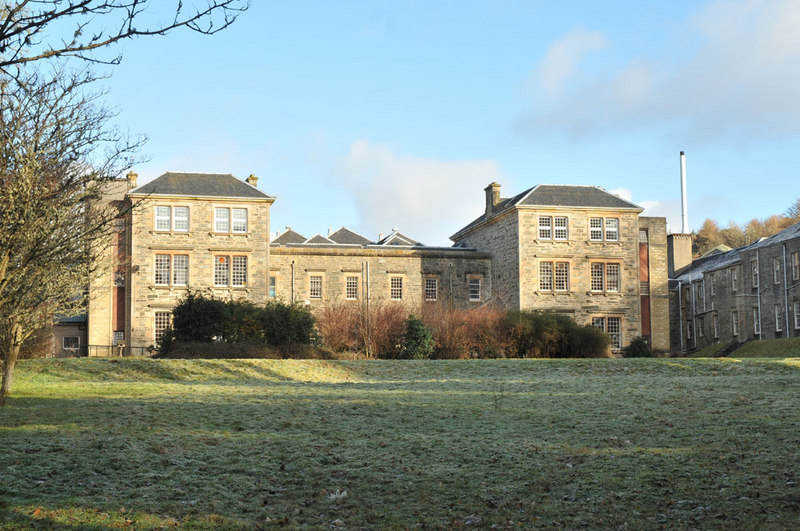
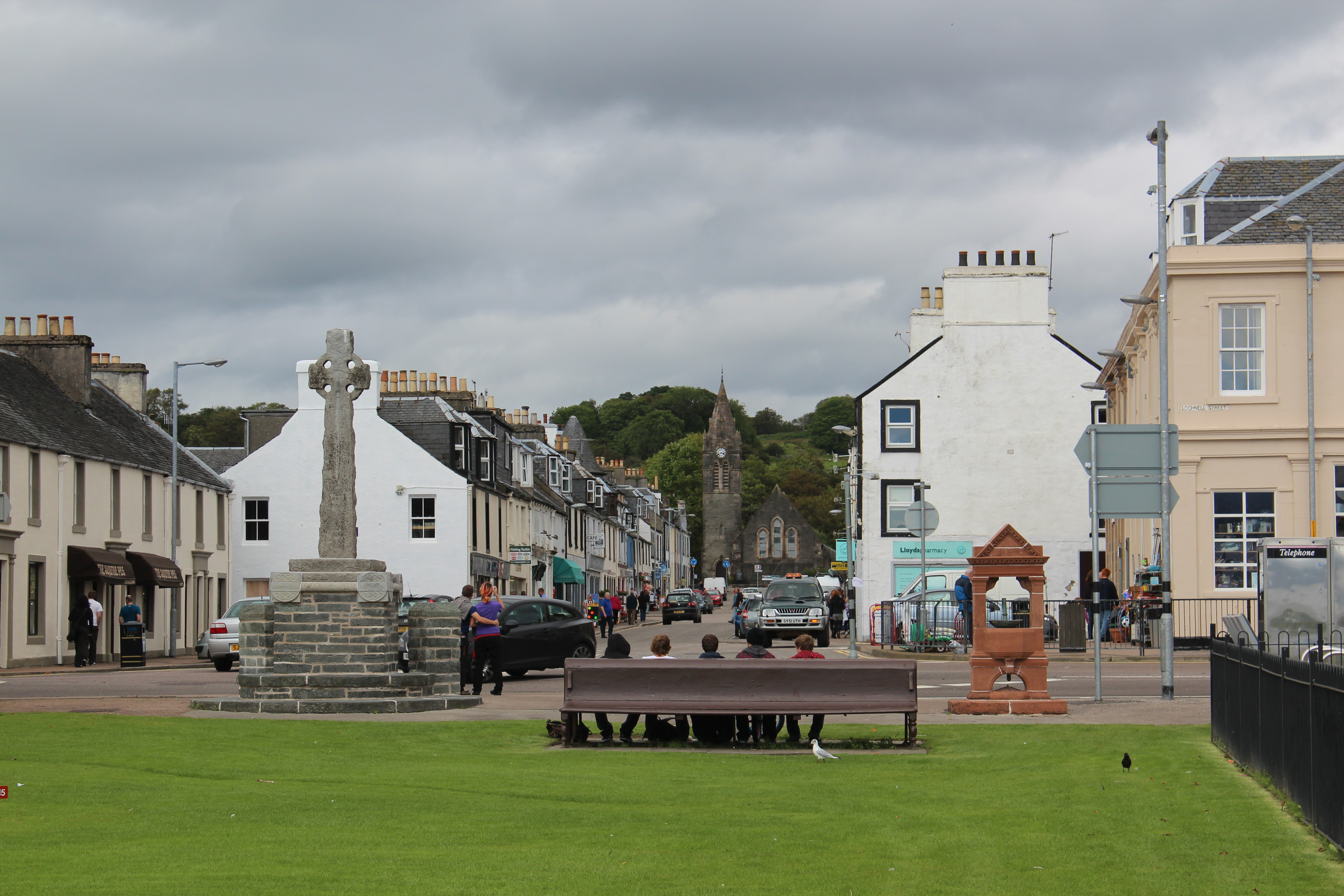
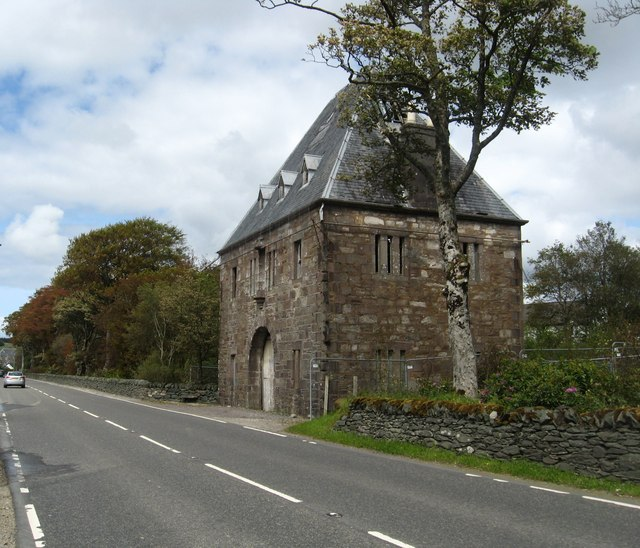
- Lochgilphead Seafront at Dusk Kilmory Castle Argyll and Bute Hospital Argyll Street The Clock Lodge

- Location within Argyll and Bute
- Population: 2,280 (2020)
- OS grid reference: NR 86284 88138
  - Edinburgh: 87 mi (140 km)
  - London: 380 mi (612 km)
- Community council: Lochgilphead
- Council area: Argyll and Bute
- Lieutenancy area: Argyll and Bute
- Country: Scotland
- Sovereign state: United Kingdom
- Post town: Lochgilphead
- Postcode district: PA30, PA31
- Dialling code: 01546
- UK Parliament: Argyll, Bute and South Lochaber
- Scottish Parliament: Argyll and Bute

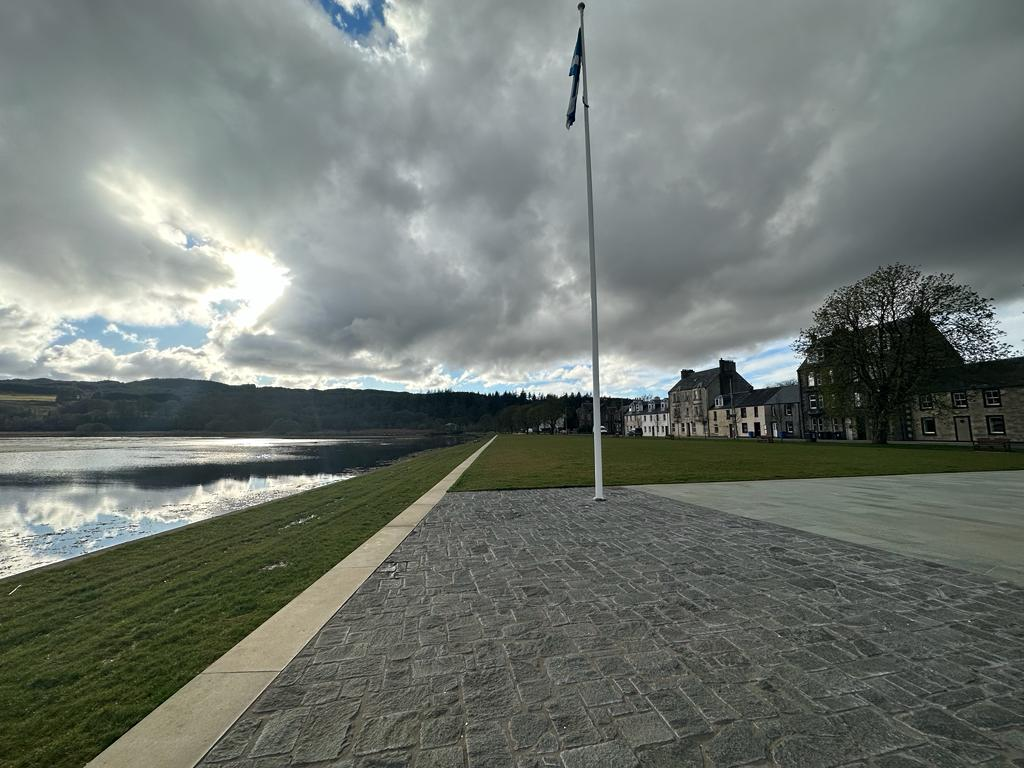
Lochgilphead coast front.

Lochgilphead (/lɒxˈɡɪlphɛd/; Scottish Gaelic: Ceann Loch Gilb [kʲʰan̪ˠ l̪ˠɔx ˈkʲilip]) is a town and former burgh in Argyll and Bute, Scotland, with a population of around 2,300 people. It is the administrative centre of Argyll and Bute Council. The village lies at the end of Loch Gilp (a branch of Loch Fyne) and lies on the banks of the Crinan Canal. Lochgilphead sits on the A83, with Ardrishaig 2 miles (3 km) to the south and Inveraray 24 miles (39 km) to the north-east; Oban lies 37 miles (60 km) north on the A816.

The council is based at Kilmory Castle, around which is located a woodland park and an Iron Age fort. Forestry and Land Scotland also have an office there.

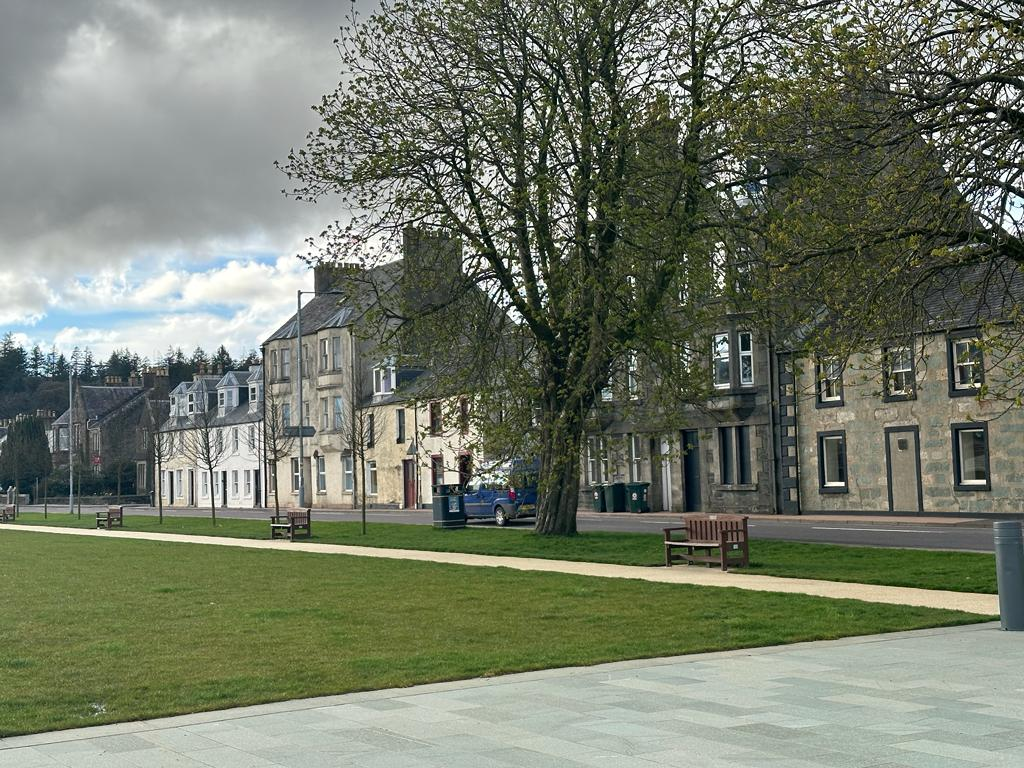
Lochgilphead coast front.

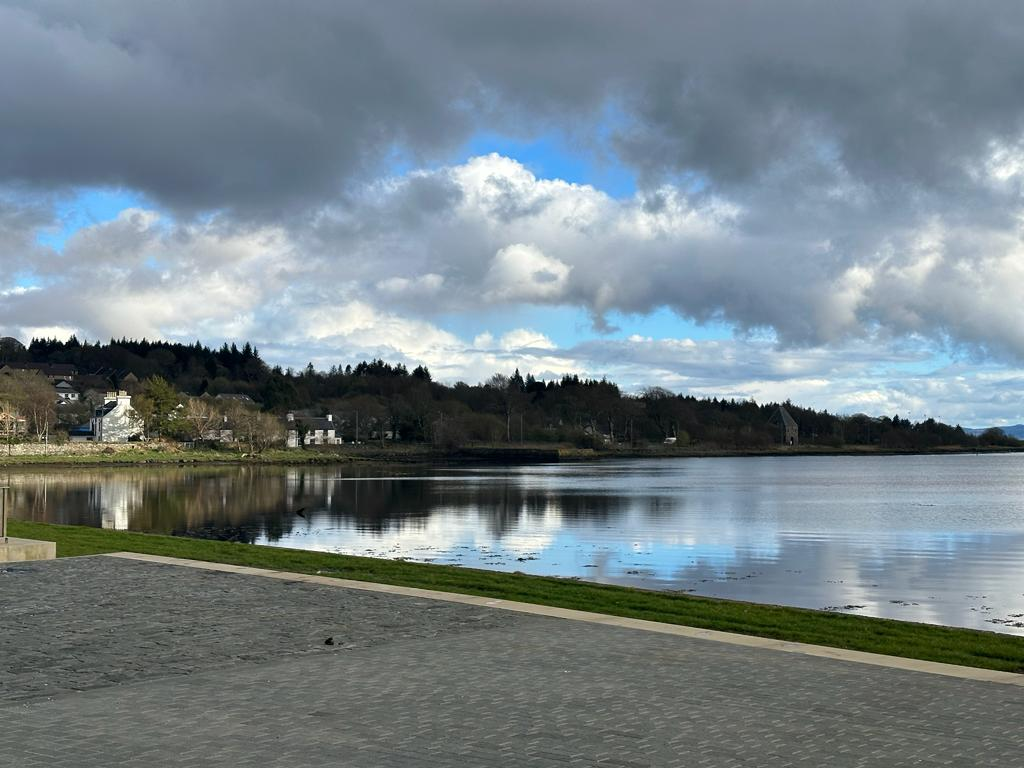
Loch Gilp from Lochgilphead.

== History ==
As a planned settlement, Lochgilphead was created in 1790, shortly after the completion of a road from Inveraray to Campbeltown. After the completion of the Crinan Canal in 1801, the town became more important as a link across the Kintyre peninsula. When a road was completed in 1830, Lochgilphead was linked to Oban. In 1831 a pier was built, promoting maritime transit between Lochgilphead and Glasgow, and other ports along the Irish Sea.

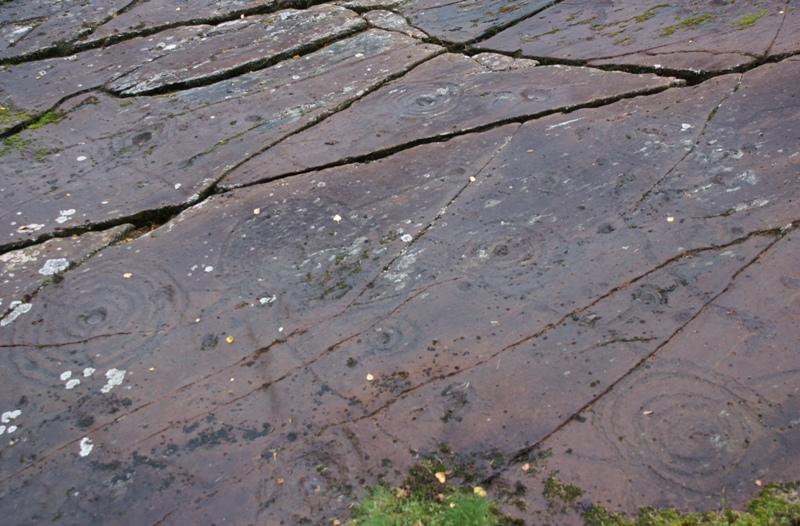
Achnabreck cup and ring marks.

In 1975 Lochgilphead was chosen as the administrative headquarters of the Argyll and Bute District Council as part of local government reorganisation, due to its central location.

There are a large number of Neolithic remains, including cup and ring marks in the nearby Kilmartin Glen, and Dunadd Hillfort (capital of the Kingdom of Dál Riata) is also close.

== Facilities ==
Lochgilphead's facilities include a swimming pool, sports centre, fishing tackle shop, a veterinary practice, Bank of Scotland, Co-op Food, Morrisons Daily, an ethical food store with deli, a butchers/greengrocers, a fishmongers, several cafés, two petrol stations (including a Tesco Express), a homewear shop, an ironmongers, Jewson builders merchants, two charity shops, a giftshop, a sweetshop, a chippy/restaurant, a chinese takeaway, an Indian takeaway, one hotel which also serves as the towns only pub, a Renault dealership, a community hospital run by the local GPs (with an A&E department and a psychiatric hospital), a nine-hole golf course, outdoor bowling club, a regional landfill site at Dunchologan, and Lochgilphead High School. There is also a local detachment of the Army Cadet Force in the town, specifically a branch of the Argyll and Sutherland Highlanders in conjunction with the Royal Regiment of Scotland. Daily bus services operated by West Coast Motors and Scottish Citylink run from the town to other parts of Scotland, notably Glasgow, Campbeltown, and Oban.

== Education ==
Lochgilphead Joint Campus is sited on the outskirts of the town and has a capacity of 727, with the Secondary School section drawing pupils from the wider mid-Argyll region. The Campus opened in October 2007, replacing the separate Primary School and High School.

Argyll College has two sites in Lochgilphead, one in Lorne Street, and the purpose-built Construction Skill Centre in Kilmory Industrial Estate.

== Economy ==
The total population of Lochgilphead was 3,825 in 2011, an increase of 3.2 per cent from 2001.

By industry of employment, a higher share of employment in construction, public administration and defence, and health and social work than the Highlands and Islands and Scotland. By occupation, a higher share of employment in caring, leisure and other services, and sales and customer services than the Highlands and Islands and Scotland. Unemployment rates have increased to above the Argyll and the Islands, Highlands and Islands and Scotland rates.

The annualised Jobseekers Allowance claimant count rate in 2013 was 4.0 per cent in Lochgilphead, 3.2 per cent in Argyll and the Islands, 2.4 per cent in Highlands and Islands and 3.7 per cent across Scotland. There is a smaller proportion of the adult population with no qualifications compared to Argyll and the Islands, the Highlands and Islands and Scotland, and more qualified with degree-level qualifications.

== Healthcare ==
Since 2017 there is one hospital in Lochgilphead:

- The Argyll and Bute Hospital closed in 2017.

The hospital, which was designed by David Cousin, opened as the Argyll District Asylum in 1863. It became the Argyll and Bute District Asylum in 1868.A new block, designed by Peddie & Kinnear, (sometimes referred to as the East House) was added in 1883 and, after joining the National Health Service as the Argyll and Bute Hospital in 1948, a new 30-bed extension was added and officially opened by the Duchess of Kent in 1971.After the introduction of Care in the Community in the early 1980s, the hospital went into a period of decline and was closed to inpatients in 2016. The hospital closed permanently in 2017. Although a Grade C listed property, the buildings are no longer maintained and in 2020 the 'East House', being unsafe, was demolished.

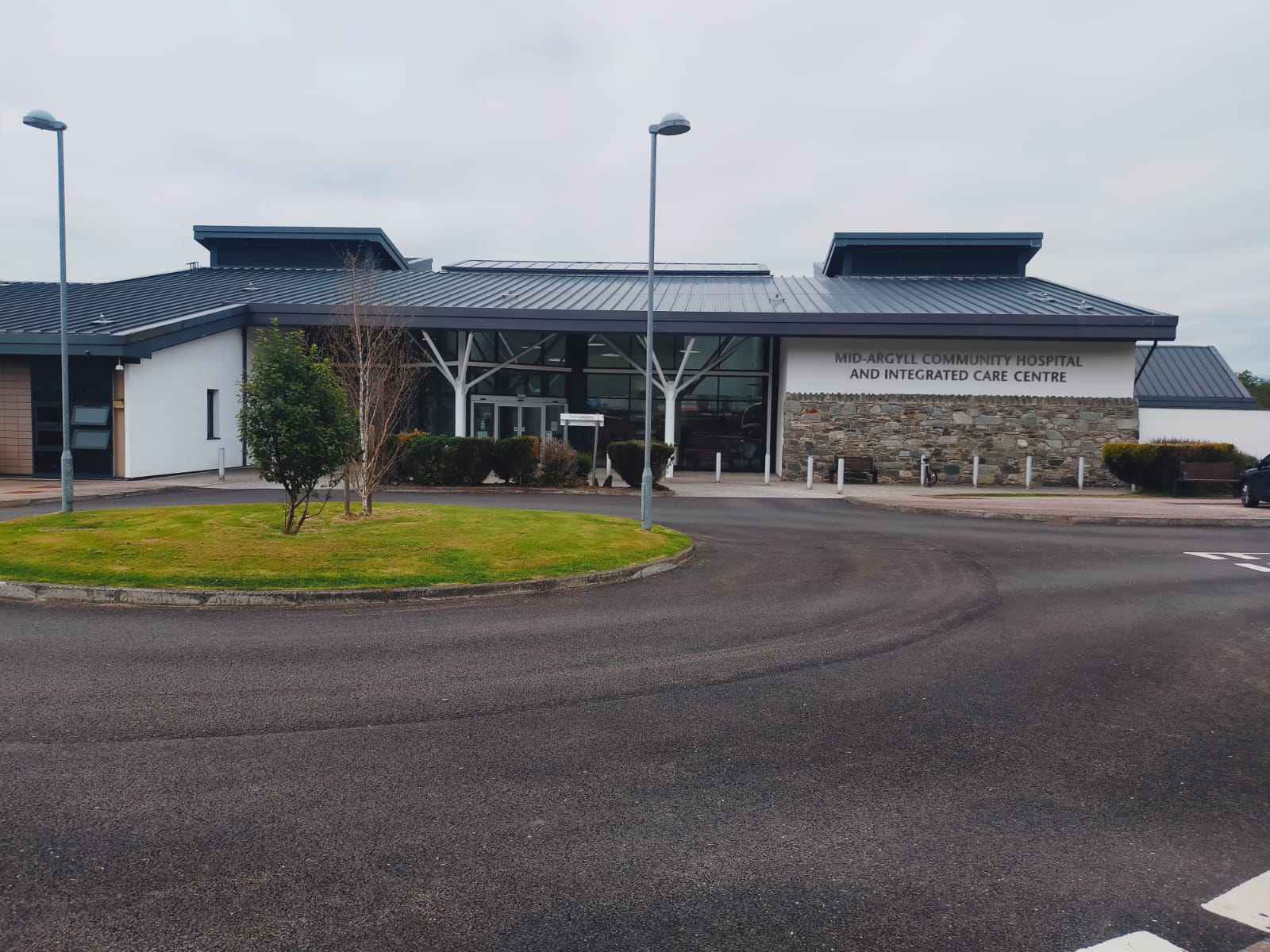
- Mid Argyll Community Hospital and Integrated Care Centre
  The Mid Argyll Community Hospital and Integrated Care Centre, services include:

Accident and Emergency (A&E). Acute inpatient ward.

Allied Health Professionals (AHPs).

GP practice. Macmillan day suite - providing day case chemotherapy and supportive treatments. Radiography. Social work

Consultant-led outpatient clinics.

Dermatology. General medicine. General surgery. Gynaecology. Obstetric. Ophthalmology. Orthopaedic. Paediatric.

Associated services.

Acute admissions ward for adult psychiatry. Children and family. Community nursing. Dental. Enhanced community dementia service. Maternity unit

Clinics run by nurses or Allied Health Professionals.

Audiology. Cardiology. Chaplaincy. Community pharmacy Dietetics. Musculoskeletal (MSK) triage Multiple Sclerosis / Parkinsons. Occupational therapy Orthotist. Physiotherapy. Podiatry. Radiotherapy. Speech and language therapy. Stroke Ultrasound - specialist clinics UVB

== Sports and leisure ==
- Mid Argyll Community Pool – a 20 m × 8 m (66 ft × 26 ft) social enterprise swimming pool.
- Mid Argyll Sports Centre – a sports centre with a multi use-games hall, dance studio, Squash Court, Gymnasium, CV Fitness Suite and a Resistance Room, as well as outdoor facilities, including full-size G2 floodlight football/hockey pitch, which can be subdivided into training pitches and four tennis courts, as well as two grass training pitches.
- Lochgilphead Golf Club, which has a nine-hole course, which was designed by Dr. I. McCamond.
- Lochgilphead Bowling Club, bowling green and clubhouse based at the Bank Park.
- Lochgilphead Library – library based at Manse Brae that has six computers for free public use, a dedicated children's area, full disabled access and also a baby-changing facility.
- Cycling – there are many cycle routes in the Lochgilphead area to cater for every level, from the Crinan Canal Towpath to the purpose-built Fire Tower Mountain Bike Trail, with a long, hard forestry climb linking on to some single track which includes berms, jumps, drop-offs and a section of north shore (raised wooden platform).
- Shinty MacCrae Park – the town's shinty pitch, and the home of Kilmory Camanachd Shinty Club.
- Putting – the Front Green is home to an 18-hole putting green, which operates seasonally.
- Fishing – there are many fishing locations around Lochgilphead which cater for sea, river, and loch fishing.
- Mid Argyll Motocross Club has a track and hold events (including Scottish Championship) at Achnashelloch.

The town is home to shinty team Kilmory Camanachd and football team, Lochgilphead Red Star.

== Community and culture ==
In July 1982, Lochgilphead competed against teams from Perth and Oban in the then highly popular BBC Television It's a Knockout, presented by Stuart Hall. The town's team won their round and later competed in the international version of the series, 'Jeux Sans Frontieres', which was recorded in Switzerland.

=== Dalriada Provincial Mod ===
The town annually hosts the Dalriada Provincial Mod each September. The event is a Gaelic festival organised by the local branch of An Comunn Gàidhealach, which provides opportunities for people of all ages to perform across a range of competitive disciplines including Gaelic music and song, highland dancing, instrumental, drama, sport, and literature.

=== Filmography ===
In the World War Two film, 633 Squadron, Lochgilphead's main street features briefly in an aerial shot, as the bombers of 633rd Squadron fly over the unnamed town en route to the target in Norway. The James Bond film From Russia with Love used locations in Lochgilphead for shots. The local cinema was used to watch screen rushes each day for the cast and crew.

=== Mid Argyll Music Festival ===
The town is one of the venues for the Mid Argyll Music Festival, which runs for around 2 weeks annually.

=== Lochgilphead Lantern Parade And Firework Display ===
This annual winter event had developed into one of the major highlights in the Argyll area, attracting crowds from near and far. However, the Lantern Parade did not occur in November 2014 after the organising committee responsible for previous events announced they would not continue in May 2014.

=== Invention and discovery ===
The Argyll Turbo GT sportscar was built by Bob Henderson in Manse Brae.

=== Mid Argyll Show ===
Lochgilphead hosts The Mid-Argyll Agricultural Show, which is a major event held annually on the second Saturday in August.

== Climate ==
Lochgilphead has an oceanic climate (Köppen: Cfb). As with most of the West Highlands, there are low sunshine levels and high amounts of rainfall, with around 1,150 sunshine hours and nearly 2,000 mm (80 in) of rainfall annually. The nearest weather station to Lochgilphead is at Lephinmore, which is 8 miles (13 km) to the north-east and 9 m (30 ft) above sea level. The 2 weather stations are at Lephinmore and the other at Dunchologan-Lingerton waste disposal landfill site. During some winter / spring high tides, coinciding with stormy weather, some of the buildings along the front short line can be susceptible to some flooding. The Badden Burn and Crinan Canal are the primary sources of river flood risk in the area to the north of the town, causing around £70,000 of damage each year to the (approx) 20 residential and 10 business properties at risk as well as the A816 leading north out of Lochgilphead.

Climate data for Lephinmore (9 m asl, averages 1991–2020, rainy days 1981-2010)
Month	Jan	Feb	Mar	Apr	May	Jun	Jul	Aug	Sep	Oct	Nov	Dec	Year
Mean daily maximum °C (°F)	7.2 (45.0)	7.9 (46.2)	9.2 (48.6)	12.3 (54.1)	15.4 (59.7)	17.1 (62.8)	18.8 (65.8)	17.5 (63.5)	16.0 (60.8)	12.7 (54.9)	9.6 (49.3)	7.6 (45.7)	12.6 (54.7)
Mean daily minimum °C (°F)	2.2 (36.0)	2.3 (36.1)	3.3 (37.9)	4.3 (39.7)	7.0 (44.6)	9.7 (49.5)	11.3 (52.3)	10.8 (51.4)	9.5 (49.1)	7.0 (44.6)	4.2 (39.6)	2.1 (35.8)	6.1 (43.1)
Average rainfall mm (inches)	242.8 (9.56)	165.4 (6.51)	171.9 (6.77)	117.2 (4.61)	93.7 (3.69)	111.4 (4.39)	110.0 (4.33)	137.6 (5.42)	161.1 (6.34)	221.4 (8.72)	209.3 (8.24)	215.7 (8.49)	1,957.5 (77.07)
Average rainy days (≥ 1.0 mm)	21.2	14.8	18.5	13.7	12.7	15.2	15.9	15.6	18.8	19.2	18.7	18.4	202.6
Mean monthly sunshine hours	37.6	61.5	85.6	148.3	154.6	150.0	157.5	119.4	86.7	77.9	51.0	26.5	1,156.6
Source: metoffice.gov.uk

== Notable people ==
- The footballer Neil Dewar was born in the town.
- The missionary Donald Fraser was born in the town.
- The architect William Fraser was born in the town.
- The singer Sydney MacEwan had built, and was for a time parish priest of St Margaret's Church in the town.
- Partick Thistle footballer Zander MacKenzie is from the town.
- Martha Payne, the subject of a censorship controversy over a blog.
