= Abbey St Bathans =

Village in the Scottish Borders

Coordinates: 55.852°N 2.386°W

Abbey St Bathans: Scottish Gaelic: Abaid Bhaoithin
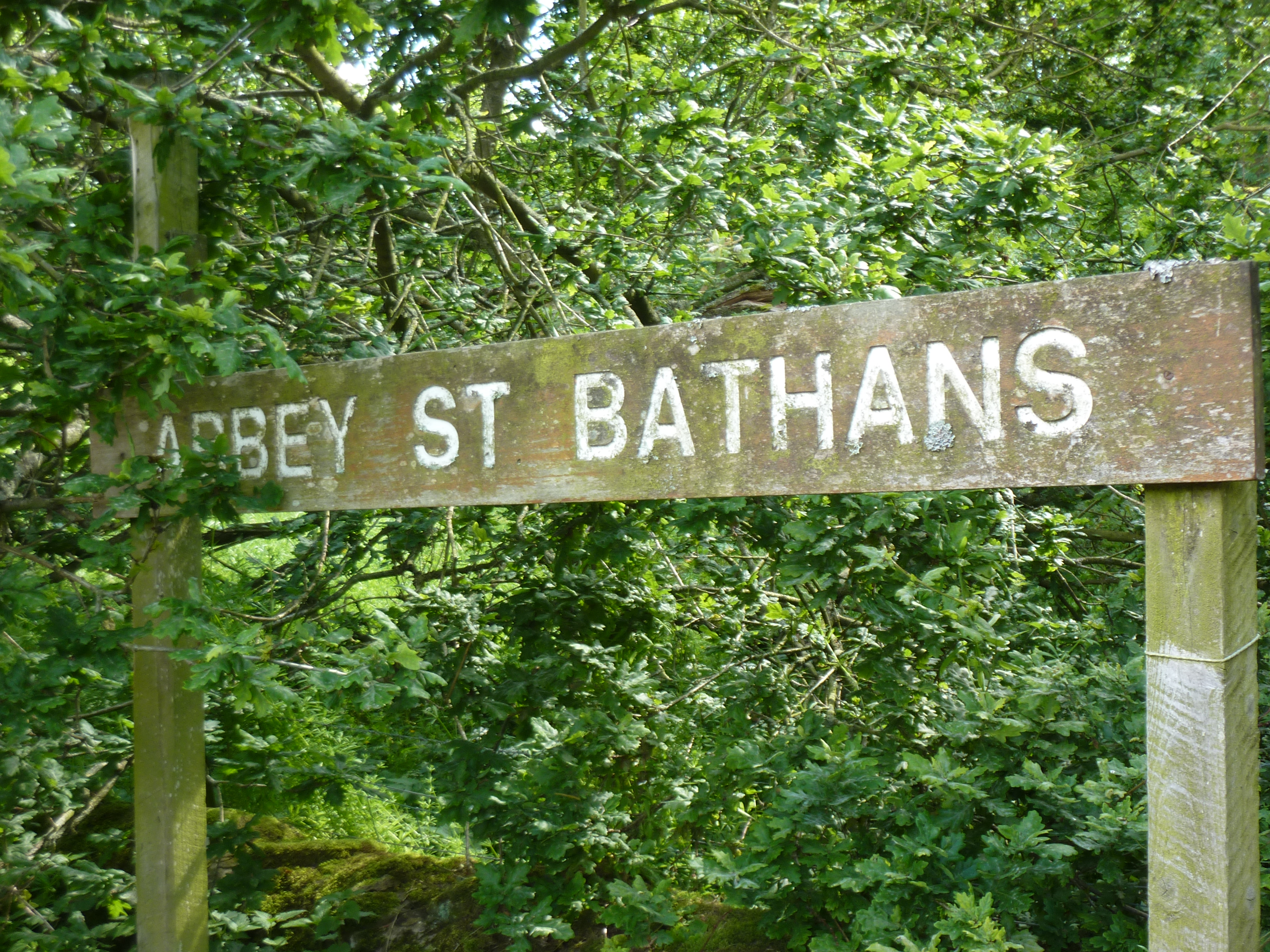
- Abbey St Bathans sign in the centre of the village

- Location within the Scottish Borders
- Population: 106 (2011)
- OS grid reference: NT762618
- Council area: Scottish Borders
- Lieutenancy area: Berwickshire
- Country: Scotland
- Sovereign state: United Kingdom
- Post town: DUNS
- Postcode district: TD11
- Police: Scotland
- Fire: Scottish
- Ambulance: Scottish
- UK Parliament: Berwickshire, Roxburgh and Selkirk
- Scottish Parliament: Ettrick, Roxburgh and Berwickshire

Abbey St Bathans (Scottish Gaelic: Abaid Bhaoithin) is a parish in the Lammermuir district of Berwickshire, in the eastern part of the Scottish Borders. Unique in its topography, it is situated in a long winding steep wooded valley that follows the Whiteadder Water. The parish had a population of 106 at the 2011 Census.

== History and Kirk ==
Abbey St Bathans was originally a priory of Cistercian Nuns established in the 12th century. It was sanctified and then used as a retreat by the sisters who formed the community at Haddington and at Nunraw, under the patronage of Ada, Countess of Dunbar and her husband Patrick, Earl of Dunbar. Though the original location of the monastic accommodation is unknown today, there is a stone on one side of the glen known as the Abbey Stone. While there are no religious houses in the village today, there is a small church in the square. A clergyman is shared with nearby hamlet of Longformacus. The dedication is to St. Bathan—Baithéne mac Brénaind—the second abbot of Iona.

While there is no priory today there is a small church, or Kirk, in private ownership situated in the centre of the village. The Kirk was rebuilt in the 18th century and incorporates, in the east and north walls, late 14th century remains of the Church of the Priory of St Mary - the original Cistercian priory founded in the late 12th or early 13th centuries (exact date unknown) and secularised in 1622.

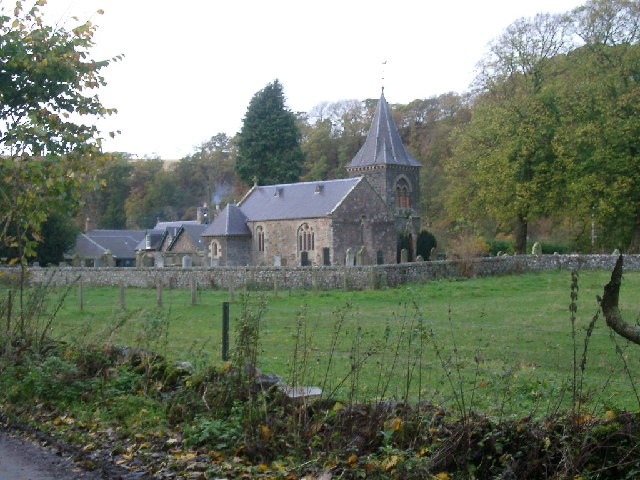
Abbey St Bathans Kirk

In the mid-1960s, a deposit or "midden" was found by the existing Kirk, on the river bank where such a "tip" would logically be located. This contained many shards of pottery which were identified as medieval by the Royal Scottish Museum, Edinburgh. This suggests that the priory was located in the riverside meadow area around the existing Kirk, and a dig would probably reveal some of the structure. This deposit was discovered and excavated by Mrs. E. K. Robb, whose family used to holiday in the village. The dedication is to Saint Bathan (Scottish Gaelic: Baithéne mac Brénaind) the second abbot of Iona. A Minister used to be shared with nearby hamlet of Longformacus.

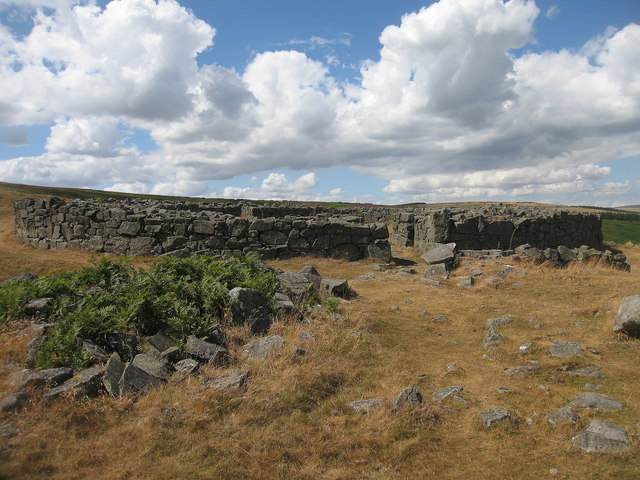
Edins Hall Broch

There is evidence that Abbey St Bathans has been inhabited for at least 2,500 years with the discovery of Bronze Age artefacts including a Bronze Age dagger, and the presence of the nearby Edins Hall Broch, an Iron Age defensive structure.

== The village ==
Abbey St Bathans village is situated beside the Whiteadder Water. The village is centred around the Kirk, a footbridge (known locally as the 'Gurkha bridge' after the Gurkha Soldiers that built it in 1987), sheep sheds, a post box, telephone exchange, phone box and housing.

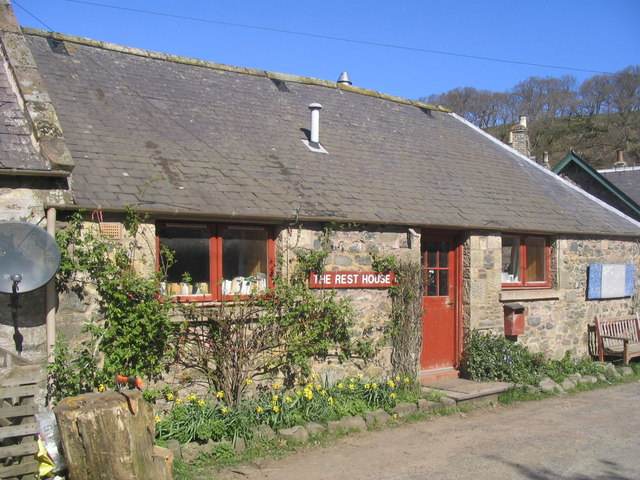
The Rest House, no longer a working youth hostel

Further up the valley north of the Kirk is the village hall which holds regular events and occasional exhibitions. Downriver, south of the Kirk can be found a fish farm, car park, café and small sawmill.

The Southern Upland Way and the Sir Walter Scott Way pass through the village. There are several footpaths for walkers including to the nearby Edins Hall Broch and Cockburn Law hill. The village is also on a bicycling route. The SYHA used to have a youth hostel in the village known locally as the Rest House, however it has been closed for over ten years.

The New Zealand township of Saint Bathans is named after the village.

== Abbey St Bathans House ==
The house began, probably in the early 19th century (a date stone of 1694 is of unknown provenance) as a thatched cottage orné, set at the base of a knoll with the ground falling away steeply to the north to the Whiteadder Water. It was built for the Turnbull family. This earlier core is identifiable at the centre of the entrance front as a two-bay section with first-floor dormers rising through the eaves, and with a salient gabled section at its northern end terminating the north-west range.

Later extensions, especially in the 1870s, retain something of the original character, if not the scale, in the plethora of traceried bargeboards, dormers, and barley-sugar chimneystacks. The detailing of the north-west front is more overtly baronial, having a central tower-like pavilion with chamfered corners at the upper levels, a tall pyramidal roof, and a quadrant bartizan at the north-east angle. There are attractive interiors, particularly the stair with twisted balusters and timber arcading. Many fittings were moved here in the 1880s by Dorothea Veitch from Bassendean House.

On the estate are a picturesque lodge, stables and groom's cottage, and an artfully composed Z-plan complex including gamekeeper's cottage and kennels.

In 2019, the house was in multiple occupation.

== See also ==
- List of places in the Scottish Borders
- List of places in Scotland
- Saint Bathans, New Zealand — a historic township named after Abbey St Bathans
- Sir Walter Scott Way
- Southern Upland Way
