= Loch Gilp =

Inlet in Argyll and Bute, Scotland

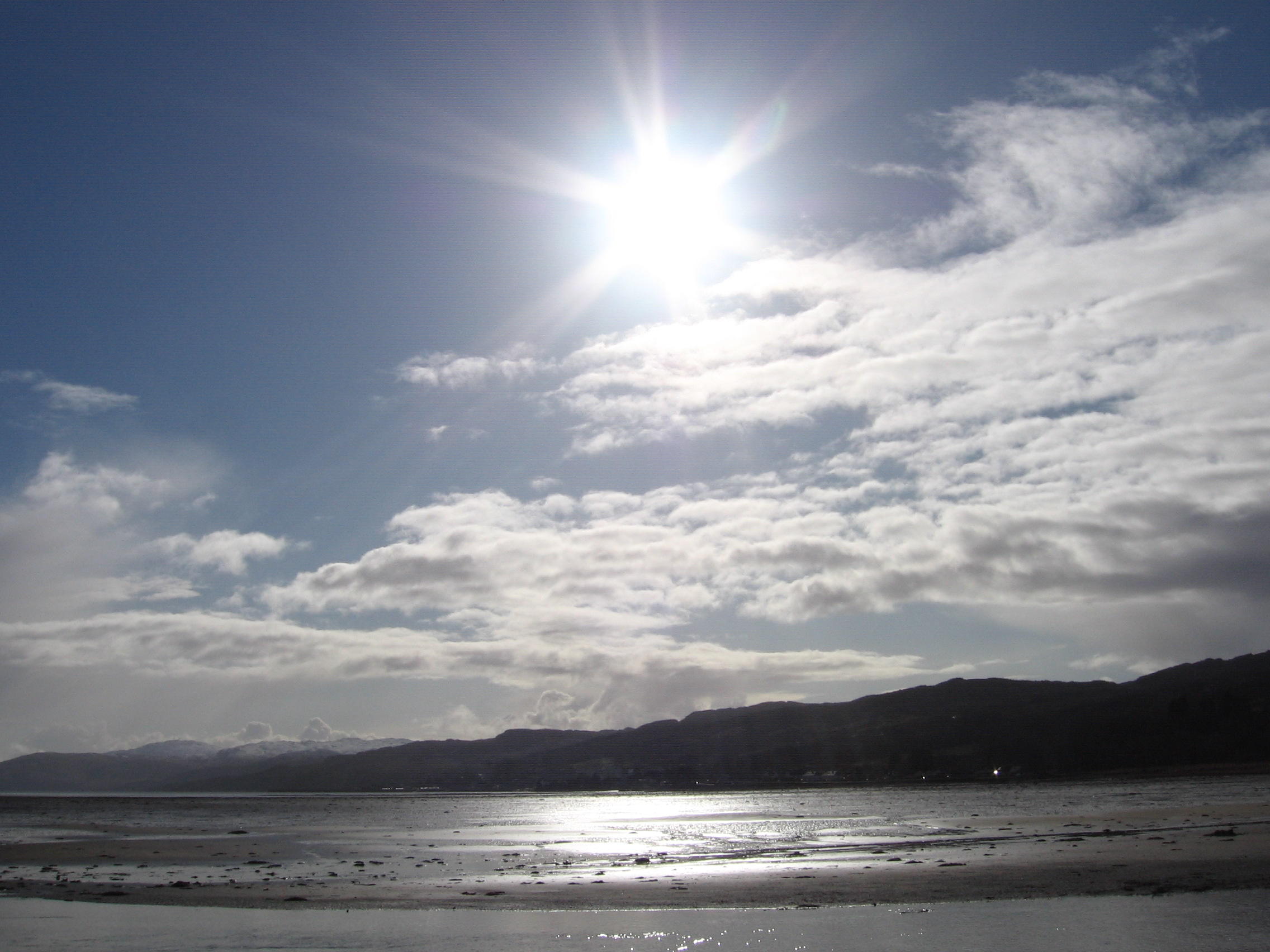
- Loch Gilp, from Poltalloch Street in Lochgilphead

- Location within Scotland
- Coordinates: 56°00′N 5°25′W
- Type: Sea Loch
- Frozen: No

Loch Gilp (Scottish Gaelic: Loch Gilp) is a small inlet on Loch Fyne, Argyll and Bute, west of Scotland. The loch gives its name to the nearby town of Lochgilphead. The Crinan Canal extends from the loch across to Crinan itself.
