= Crinan Canal =

Manmade waterway in Scotland

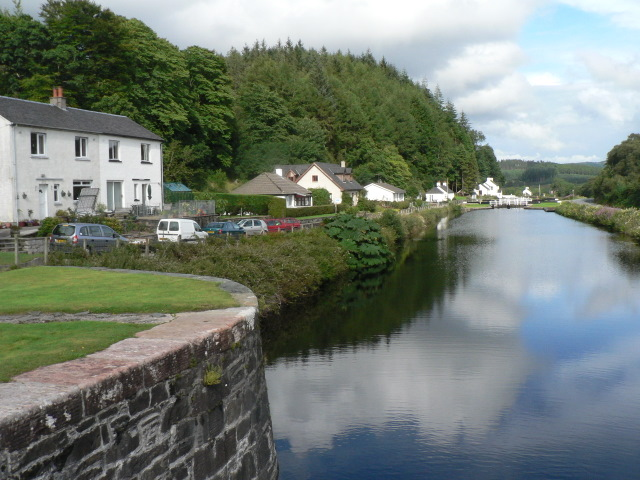
- The Crinan Canal at Cairnbaan
- Interactive map of Crinan Canal
- Location: Argyll and Bute
- Country: Scotland
- Coordinates: 56°03′27″N 05°27′57″W NR 84306 90378

Specifications
- Length: 9 miles (14 km)
- Status: Open

History
- Current owner: Scottish Canals, Scottish Government
- Principal engineer: James Paterson, James Watt, John Rennie and Thomas Telford
- Date of act: 1773
- Construction began: 1794
- Date completed: 1801

Geography
- Direction: west to east
- Start point: Crinan
- End point: Lochgilphead
- Beginning coordinates: 56°05′28″N 05°33′23″W
- Ending coordinates: 56°00′43″N 05°26′44″W

Designations

Scheduled monument
- Official name: Crinan Canal, Crinan to Cairnbaan
- Type: Industrial: bridge, viaduct, aqueduct; dock, harbour, lock; inland water; light, warning, signal
- Designated: 4 September 1996
- Reference no.: SM6500

Scheduled monument
- Official name: Crinan Canal, Cairnbaan - Ardrishaig
- Type: Industrial: bridge, viaduct, aqueduct; dock, harbour, lock; engine, engine house; inland water; light, warning, signal
- Designated: 4 September 1996
- Reference no.: SM6501

The Crinan Canal is a nine-mile-long (14 km) navigable canal in Argyll and Bute, west of Scotland. It opened in 1801 and connects the village of Ardrishaig on Loch Gilp with Crinan on the Sound of Jura, providing a navigable route between the Firth of Clyde and the Inner Hebrides, without the need for a long diversion around the Kintyre Peninsula, and in particular the exposed Mull of Kintyre.

Today the canal is operated by Scottish Canals and is a popular route for leisure craft, used by nearly 2,000 boats annually. The towpath is part of National Cycle Route 78.

The canal is a two-part scheduled monument. Loch a' Bharain, which serves as a feeder reservoir for the canal, is also a scheduled monument.

== History ==
Crinan Canal Act 1793
- Act of Parliament
- Parliament of Great Britain
- Long title: An Act for making and maintaining a Navigable Canal from Loch Gilp to Loch Crinan, in the Shire of Argyll.
- Citation: 33 Geo. 3. c. 104
- Territorial extent: Great Britain

Dates
- Royal assent: 8 May 1793
- Commencement: 8 May 1793 (Note: The Acts of Parliament (Commencement) Act 1793.)
Other legislation
Amended by	Crinan Canal Act 1799

Status: Amended

Text of statute as originally enacted

The canal was built to provide a shortcut for commercial sailing and fishing vessels and later Clyde puffers to travel between the industrialised region around Glasgow to the West Highland villages and islands. Authorised by the Crinan Canal Act 1793 (33 Geo. 3. c. 104), it was designed by civil engineer John Rennie and work started in 1794, but was not completed until 1801, two years later than planned. The canal's construction was beset with problems including finance and poor weather. Landowners demanded high prices for their land and navvies were reluctant to leave jobs in more accessible parts of England and Scotland. The construction cost £127,000 (equivalent to £8,220,000 in 2025).

On Saturday 8 August 1801, the Carlisle Journal reported that:

On Monday, a boat laden with fish, arrived at the Broomielaw, Glasgow, from one of the Western Isles, being the first vessel that has passed through the Crinan Canal

The canal bank near Lochgilphead failed in 1805 and the canal's course was diverted to avoid the marshy ground. The canal's reservoirs were finished in 1809 but two years later a storm caused one to burst releasing its water and sending boulders and mud along the canal in both directions wrecking locks, the canal banks and the nearby roads. Repairs cost £8,000 (equivalent to £558,700 in 2025).

The canal company, headed by the Duke of Argyll, had to seek help from the government, who asked Thomas Telford to assess the problems. He suggested improvements to the locks, and some parts of the canal were redesigned including the swing bridges which were replaced in cast iron in 1816. The government paid for the work but the canal company lost control and it was handed to the Caledonian Canal Commissioners by the Caledonian Canal Act 1848 (11 & 12 Vict. c. 54).

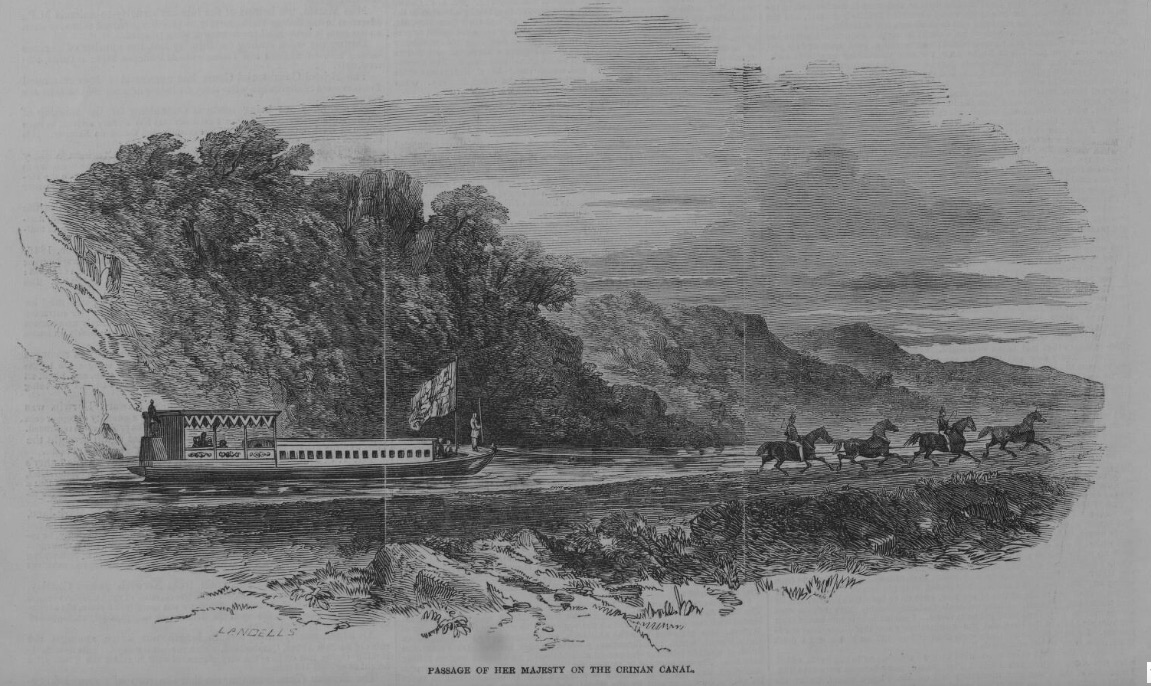
Passage of Her Majesty on the Crinan Canal from the Illustrated London News 28 August 1847

Queen Victoria travelled along the canal to Crinan during a holiday in the Scottish Highlands in 1847. She was greeted at Ardrishaig and her boat was towed by four horses, two of which were ridden by postilions in royal livery. At Crinan she boarded the royal yacht Victoria and Albert. Her journey made the canal a tourist attraction and gave the canal an added purpose. Passenger steamer companies operating out of Glasgow advertised the canal as the "Royal route" and by 1857 more than 44,000 passengers passed through Ardrishaig each year and were met by steamers to Oban at Crinan.

A disaster occurred on 2 February 1859 when the Camloch reservoir supplying the canal burst, and the ensuing torrent of water and rock damaged the banks of the canal and seven of the gates forming the locks which were swept into the valley below. The canal was closed for through navigation until 1 May 1860 although the wider repairs to paths and road had not been completed. Although Parliament had authorised £12,000 (equivalent to £1,260,000 in 2025) for repairs the company reported that the expenditure had exceeded the budget by around £3,500 (equivalent to £367,900 in 2025) as the damage included large boulders of rock which were found in the bed of the canal.

In 1866 a steam-powered passenger boat Linnet replaced horse-drawn boats for tourists. Linnet remained in service until 1929.

Between 1930 and 1932, new sea locks were built at either end, making the canal accessible at any state of tide. The swing bridge at Ardrishaig was installed at this time. The canal became the responsibility of British Waterways in 1962. It closed for nine-week period in October 1987 to allow some refurbishment. On 2 July 2012 the British Waterways functions in Scotland became Scottish Canals.

== Features ==
The Crinan Canal has 15 locks and is crossed by seven bridges: six swing bridges and a retractable bridge. Stone for the 15 locks was brought from Mull, the Isle of Arran and Morvern. From Ardrishaig, three locks raise the canal's 4-mile-long (6-kilometre) east reach to 32 ft (10 m) above sea level. The 1,100 yd (1,000 m) summit reach, between Cairnbaan and Dunardry, is 64 feet (20 metres) above sea level. The west reach between Dunardry and Crinan is 18 feet (5.5 metres) above sea level. The canal is 10 ft (3 m) deep, although the declared maximum draught for a vessel is 2.5 m (8.2 ft), and power lines which cross the canal restrict the height limit to 30 metres (98 ft).

The retractable bridge at Lock 11 replaced the original swing bridge in 1900. It is operated by a rotating handle and a cogged wheel which causes the bridge deck to roll forwards and backwards on rails and comes to rest across the lock chamber. It is no longer is use. The canal has towpaths on both sides from Ardrishaig to Crinan Bridge (no longer) and horses assisted unpowered craft until 1959.

Feature	Location	Type
Lock 1 (sea lock)	Ardrishaig	Lock
Ardrishaig Swing Bridge	Ardrishaig	Swing bridge
Ardrishaig Basin	Ardrishaig	Basin
Lock 2	Ardrishaig	Lock
Lock 3	Ardrishaig	Lock
Lock 4	Ardrishaig	Lock
Lock 4 Bridge	Ardrishaig	Swing bridge
Oakfield Bridge	Lochgilphead	Swing bridge
Lock 5	Cairnbaan	Lock
Cairnbaan Bridge	Cairnbaan	Swing bridge
Lock 6	Cairnbaan	Lock
Lock 7	Cairnbaan	Lock
Lock 8	Cairnbaan	Lock
Lock 9	Dunardry	Lock
Lock 10	Dunardry	Lock
Lock 11	Dunardry	Lock
Dunardry Bridge	Dunardry	Moveable bridge
Lock 12	Dunardry	Lock
Lock 13	Dunardry	Lock
Bellanoch Bridge	Bellanoch	Swing bridge
Bellanoch Marina	Bellanoch	Marina
Crinan Bridge	Crinan	Swing bridge
Lock 14	Crinan	Lock
Crinan Basin	Crinan	Basin
Lock 15 (sea lock)	Crinan	Lock

== Gallery ==
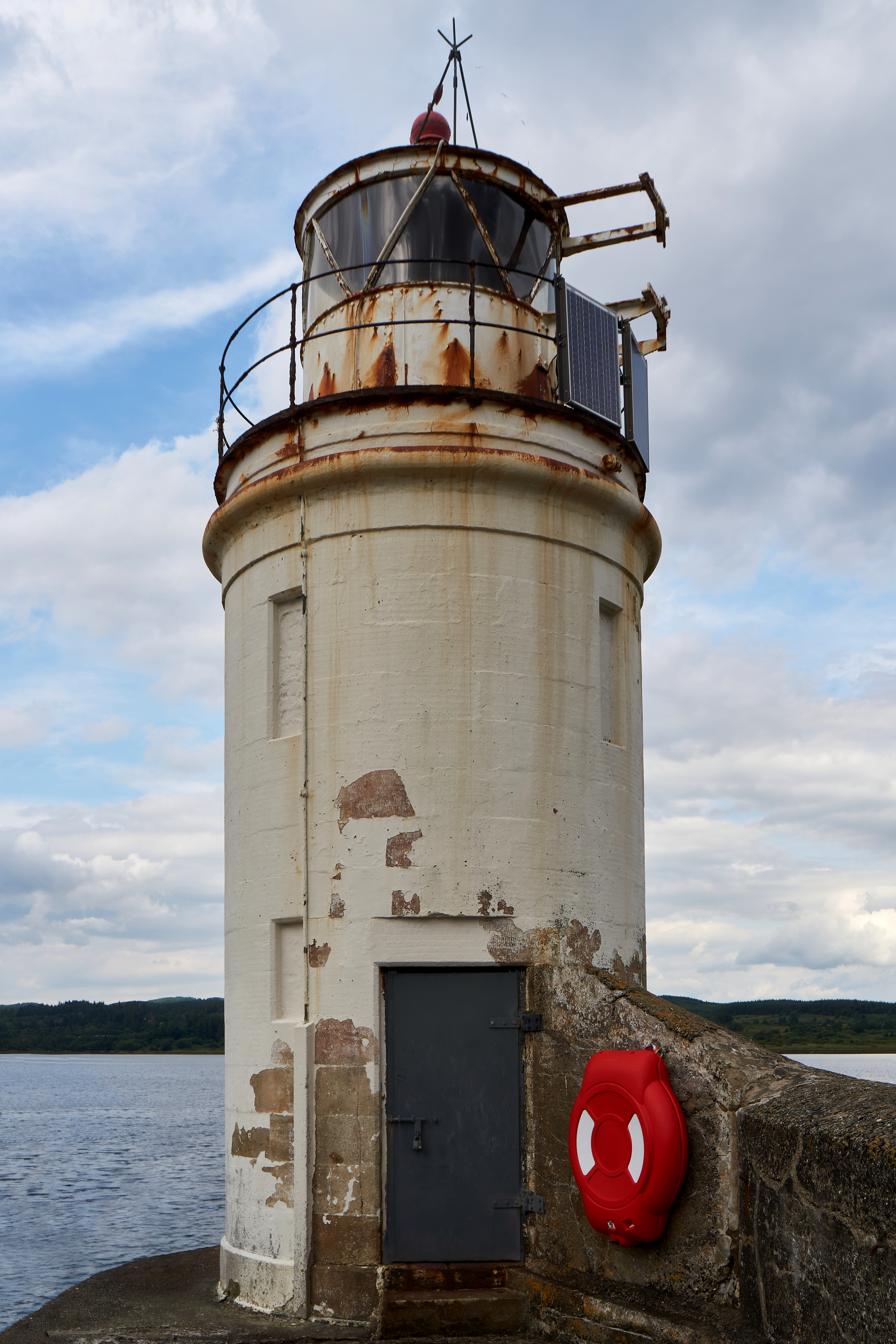
Ardrishaig lighthouse

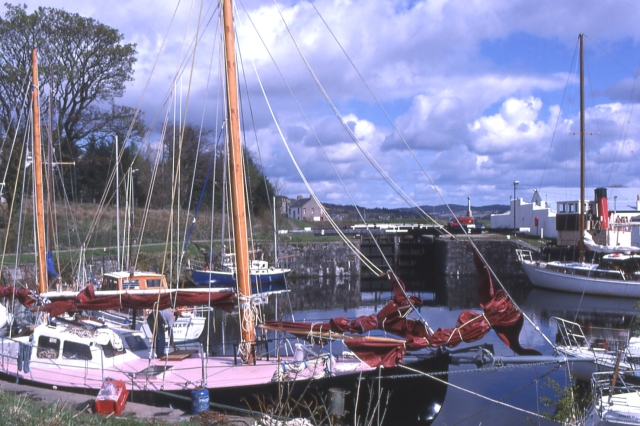
Ardrishaig basin.

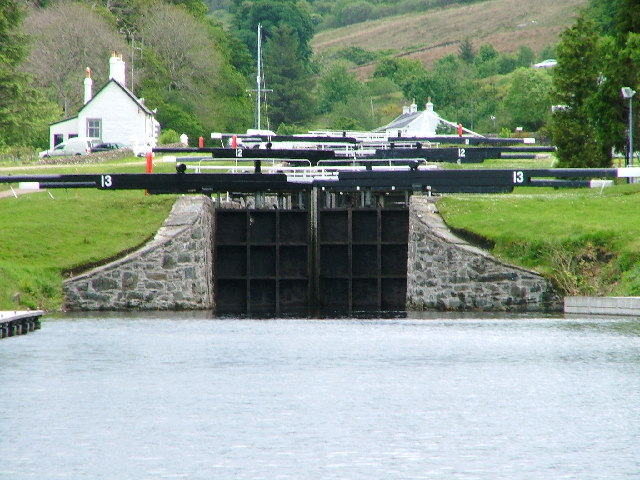
Dunardry locks

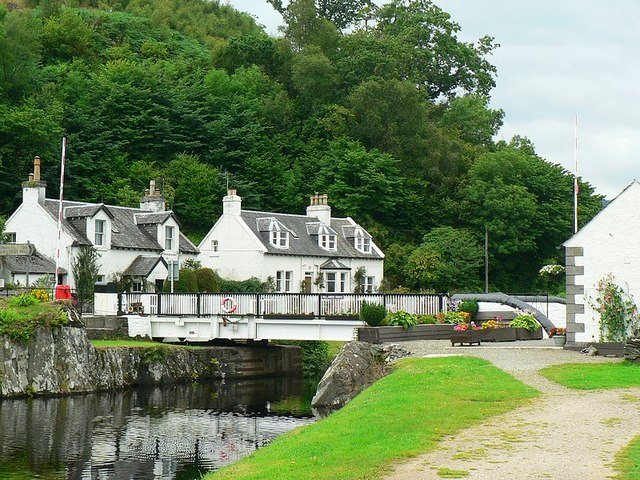
Bellanoch Bridge

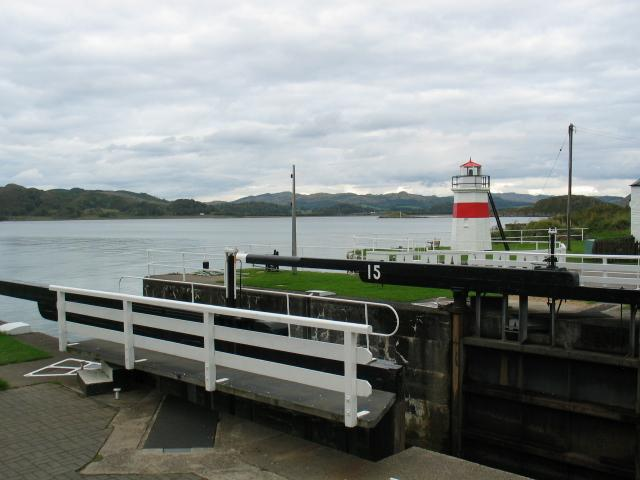
The sea lock and Crinan Lighthouse

== Popular culture ==
A song sung by Dan MacPhail in The Vital Spark:

Oh! The Crinan Canal for me,
I don't like the wild raging sea,
It would be too terrific to cross the Pacific,
Or sail to Japan or Fiji.
A life on the Spanish Main,
I think it would drive me insane,
The big foaming breakers would give me the shakers,
The Crinan Canal for me.

== See also ==
- Canals of the United Kingdom
- History of the British canal system
- Clan MacTavish#Castle of Dunardry Ruins Discovered

== Bibliography ==
- Burrows, George W. (1981). Puffer Ahoy!. Brown, Son and Fergusson. ISBN 978-0-85174-419-3.
- Cumberlidge, Jane (2009). Inland Waterways of Great Britain (8th Ed.). Imray Laurie Norie and Wilson. ISBN 978-1-84623-010-3.
- Hutton, Guthrie (2003). Crinan Canal The Shipping Short Cut. Stenlake Publishing. ISBN 978-1-84033-257-5.
- Paterson, Len (2005). From Sea To Sea: A History of the Scottish Lowland and Highland Canals. Glasgow: Neil Wilson Publishing. ISBN 978-1903238943.
