= Stereolab discography =

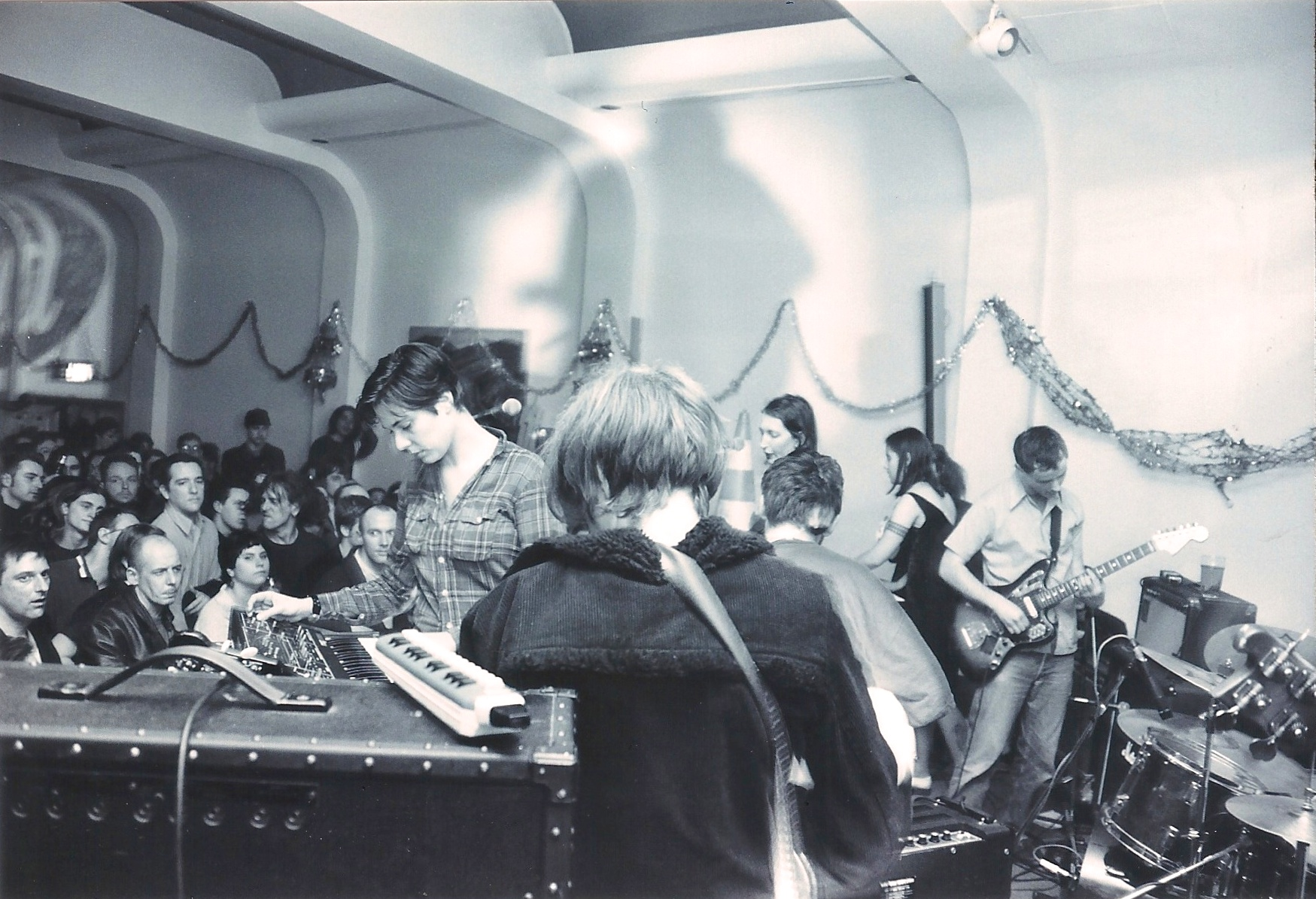
- Studio albums: 11
- Extended plays: 15
- Compilation albums: 7
- Singles: 16
- Rarities: 23

The discography of Stereolab, an English-French rock band, comprises thirteen studio albums, seven compilation albums, fifteen extended plays, sixteen singles, and twenty-three rarities compilations. Release dates listed are earliest worldwide.

== Albums ==
=== Studio albums ===
Title	Album details	Peak chart positions					
Title	Album details	UK	IRL	NOR	US	US Heat.	US Indie
Peng!	Released: 26 May 1992; Label: Too Pure; Format: LP, CD, cassette	—	—	—	—	—	—
Transient Random-Noise Bursts with Announcements	Released: 10 August 1993; Label: Duophonic; Format: LP, CD, cassette	62	—	—	—	—	—
Mars Audiac Quintet	Released: 8 August 1994; Label: Duophonic; Format: LP, CD, cassette	16	—	—	—	—	—
Emperor Tomato Ketchup	Released: 11 March 1996; Label: Duophonic; Format: LP, CD, cassette	27	—	—	—	27	—
Dots and Loops	Released: 22 September 1997; Label: Duophonic; Format: LP, CD, cassette	19	—	38	111	2	—
Cobra and Phases Group Play Voltage in the Milky Night	Released: 21 September 1999; Label: Duophonic; Format: LP, CD	92	—	—	154	8	—
Sound-Dust	Released: 28 August 2001; Label: Duophonic; Format: LP, CD	117	—	—	178	11	—
Margerine Eclipse	Released: 27 January 2004; Label: Duophonic; Format: LP, CD	108	—	—	174	6	—
Chemical Chords	Released: 18 August 2008; Label: Duophonic, 4AD; Format: LP, CD, digital download	102	69	—	170	7	24
Not Music	Released: 16 November 2010; Label: Duophonic; Format: LP, CD	—	—	—	—	20	—
Instant Holograms on Metal Film	Released: 23 May 2025; Label: Duophonic; Format: LP, CD, digital download, streaming	29	—	—	—	—	—

=== Mini-LPs ===
Title	Album details	Peak chart positions
Title	Album details	UK
The Groop Played "Space Age Bachelor Pad Music"	Released: 22 March 1993; Label: Too Pure, American; Format: LP, CD	—
Music for the Amorphous Body Study Center	Released: 17 April 1995; Label: Duophonic; Format: LP, CD	59
The First of the Microbe Hunters	Released: 16 May 2000; Label: Duophonic, Elektra; Format: LP, CD	—

=== Compilations ===
Title	Album details	Peak chart positions		
Title	Album details	UK	US Heat.	US Indie
Switched On	Released: October 1992; Label: Too Pure, Slumberland; Format: LP, CD	—	—	—
Refried Ectoplasm (Switched On Volume 2)	Released: July 1995; Label: Duophonic, Drag City; Format: LP, CD, cassette	30	—	—
Aluminum Tunes (Switched On Volume 3)	Released: 20 October 1998; Label: Duophonic, Drag City; Format: LP, CD	109	—	—
ABC Music: The Radio 1 Sessions	Released: 8 October 2002; Label: Strange Fruit, Koch; Format: CD	—	—	—
Oscillons from the Anti-Sun	Released: 25 April 2005; Label: Duophonic, Too Pure; Format: CD	—	45	39
Fab Four Suture	Released: 6 March 2006; Label: Duophonic, Too Pure; Format: LP, CD	177	28	35
Serene Velocity: A Stereolab Anthology	Released: 29 August 2006; Label: Duophonic, Elektra; Format: LP, CD	—	—	—
Electrically Possessed (Switched On Volume 4)	Released: 26 February 2021; Label: Duophonic, Warp; Format: LP, CD	—	—	—
Pulse of the Early Brain (Switched On Volume 5)	Released: 2 September 2022; Label: Duophonic, Warp; Format: LP, CD	66	—	—

== Singles and EPs ==
List of singles, with selected chart positions
Title	Year	Peak	Album
Title	Year	UK	Album
Super 45	1991	—	Non-album singles
Stunning Debut Album	1991	—	Non-album singles
"Super-Electric"	1991	—	Non-album singles
"Low Fi"	1992	—	Non-album singles
"The Light That Will Cease to Fail"	1992	—	Non-album singles
"Harmonium/Farfisa"	1992	—	Non-album singles
"John Cage Bubblegum"	1993	—	Non-album singles
"Lo Boob Oscillator"	1993	—	Non-album singles
"French Disko"	1993	—	Non-album singles
"Crumb Duck" (with Nurse with Wound)	1993	—	Non-album singles
"Jenny Ondioline" / "French Disko"	1993	75	Transient Random-Noise Bursts with Announcements
"Ping Pong"	1994	45	Mars Audiac Quintet
"Wow and Flutter"	1994	70	Mars Audiac Quintet
"Cybele's Reverie"	1996	62	Emperor Tomato Ketchup
"Fluorescences"	1996	78	Non-album single
"Metronomic Underground"	1996	—	Emperor Tomato Ketchup
"Miss Modular"	1997	60	Dots and Loops
Fires (with Ui, credited to Uilab)	1998	—	Non-album singles
"Calimero" (with Brigitte Fontaine)	1999	153	Non-album singles
"Simple Headphone Mind" (with Nurse with Wound)	1999	—	Non-album singles
"The Free Design"	1999	157	Cobra and Phases Group Play Voltage in the Milky Night
Instant 0 in the Universe	2003	—	Non-album singles
"Interlock"	2005	132	Non-album singles
"Kyberneticka Babicka"	2005	133	Non-album singles
"Plastic Mile"	2005	135	Non-album singles
"Excursions into Oh A-Oh"	2006	152	Non-album singles
"Eye of the Volcano"	2006	155	Non-album singles
"Whisper Pitch"	2006	162	Non-album singles
"Explosante Fixe"	2008	—	Non-album singles
"Three Women"	2008	—	Chemical Chords
"Aerial Troubles"	2025	—	Instant Holograms on Metal Film
"Melodie Is a Wound"	2025	—	Instant Holograms on Metal Film
"Transmuted Matter"	2025	—	Instant Holograms on Metal Film
"Fed Up with Your Job?" / "Constant and Uniform Movement Unknown"	2025	— (Note: "Fed Up with Your Job?" did not enter the UK Singles chart, but peaked at number 24 on the UK Singles Sales Chart.)	Non-album singles
"Cloud Land" / "Flashes in the Afternoon"	2026	— (Note: "Cloud Land" did not enter the UK Singles chart, but peaked at number 28 on the UK Singles Sales Chart.)	Non-album singles
"—" denotes a recording that did not chart or was not released in that territory.

=== Music videos ===
Title	Year	Director(s)	Ref.
"We're Not Adult Orientated"	1993		
"Jenny Ondioline"	1993	Michael Clifford	
"Wow and Flutter"	1994	Nick Abrahams and Mikey Tomkins	
"Ping Pong"	1994	Nick Abrahams and Mikey Tomkins	
"Cybele's Reverie"	1996	Nick Abrahams and Mikey Tomkins	
"The Noise of the Carpet"	1996	Nick Abrahams and Mikey Tomkins	
"Miss Modular"	1997	Nick Abrahams and Mikey Tomkins	
"The Free Design"	1999	Nick Abrahams and Mikey Tomkins	

=== Rarities ===
Year	Month	Day	Title	Label (UK)	Label (US)	Format	Notes
1992	-	-	Ronco Symphony	Spacewatch	-	Flexidisc single	split (w/ Submariner)
1993	December	23	French Disko	Duophonic	-	7"/CD single	1500 7", 1000 CD
1993	-	-	High Expectations	Tea Time Fanzine	-	Flexidisc single	split (w/ Guitare Boy), came with issue #6
1993	-	-	Shimmies in Super Eight	Duophonic	-	7" EP	multi-split, 800 copies
1993	-	-	Mountain	-	Teenbeat	7" single	split (w/ Unrest), 2000 copies
1994	-	-	I'm Going Out Of My Way	-	Radiopaque	7" single	split (w/ Scrawl), 1400 copies
1995	-	-	The Long Hair of Death	Duophonic	-	7" single	split (w/ Yo La Tengo), 3000 copies
1995	-	-	The Eclipse	Wurlitzer Jukebox	-	Flexidisc single	split (w/ Cat's Miaow), 1000 copies
1996	-	-	Laminations	Elektra	-	CD EP	promo
1996	-	-	Noises	-	-	-	promo
1996	-	-	Percolations	Uberschall	-	7" single	split (w/ Foetus and Faust), 2000 copies
1996	-	-	You Used To Call Me Sadness	Lissy's	-	7" single	split (w/ Fuxa), 1900 copies
1996	-	-	Speedy Car	Duophonic	-	7" single	split (w/ Tortoise), 3000 copies
1997	-	-	Cadriopo	Groovy Moogy Recordings	-	7" single	split (w/ Fugu)
1997	-	-	The Noise Of Carpet	Elektra	-	CD EP	promo
1997	-	-	Miss Modular Remix	Elektra	-	12" EP	2000 copies
1997	-	-	Iron Man	Duophonic	-	7" single	3,700 copies
1998	-	-	Refractions in the Plastic Pulse	Duophonic	-	12" single	two-track remix
1998	-	-	Stereolab Sampler	East West Japan	-	CD	promo Japanese only compilation
1998	-	-	Symbolic Logic Of Now!	Luke Warm Music	-	7" single	split (w/ Soi-Disant)
1999	April	-	The In Sound	Independent Project Records	-	7" single	2500 copies
1999	-	-	The Underground Is Coming	Duophonic	-	7" EP	
2001	-	-	Free Witch And No Bra Queen	Duophonic	-	7" single	2,000 copies
2001	-	-	"Rose, My Rocket-Brain"	Duophonic	-	7" single, mini CD	500 copies
2006	-	-	"Solar Throw-Away / Jump Drive Shut-Out"	Duophonic	-	7" single	3,600 copies
2008	-	-	"Spool Of Collusion "	4AD	-	7" single	5000 copies, free with Chemical Chords
2025	-	-	"Cloud Land / Flashes In The Afternoon "	Duophonic	-	7" single	European/US tour single
