= Serene Velocity (album) =

Compilation album by Stereolab
- Released: 29 August 2006
- Recorded: May 1993–2003
- Labels: Elektra/Rhino (US); Duophonic (UK)

Stereolab chronology
Fab Four Suture (2006)	Serene Velocity (2006)	Chemical Chords (2008)

Professional ratings
Review scores
Source	Rating
AllMusic	4/5 stars
Pitchfork	8.5/10
PopMatters	5/10

Serene Velocity is a compilation album by Stereolab, released in late 2006. It focuses on material released during the band's Elektra years.

== Track listing ==
1. "Jenny Ondioline, Pt. 1" (from the 1993 Jenny Ondioline EP.) – 3:42
2. "Crest" (from Transient Random-Noise Bursts with Announcements (1993)) – 6:07
3. "French Disko" (from the 1993 French Disko single.) – 3:33
4. "Ping Pong" (from Mars Audiac Quintet (1994)) – 3:02
5. "Wow and Flutter" (7" Version) (from the 1994 Wow and Flutter EP) – 3:02
6. "Cybele's Reverie" (from Emperor Tomato Ketchup (1996)) – 4:42
7. "Metronomic Underground" – 7:52
8. "Percolator" – 4:15
9. "Brakhage" (from Dots and Loops (1997)) – 5:29
10. "Miss Modular" – 4:13
11. "Infinity Girl" (from Cobra and Phases Group Play Voltage in the Milky Night (1999)) – 3:55
12. "Come and Play in the Milky Night" – 4:38
13. "Space Moth" (from Sound-Dust (2001)) – 7:34
14. "Double Rocker" – 5:32
15. "Vonal Declosion" (from Margerine Eclipse (2004)) – 3:27
16. "...Sudden Stars" – 4:41
