= Calimero =

- Calimero character
- Calimero poster for the 1974 anime series featuring main characters Calimero and Priscilla.
- First appearance: Carosello
- Created by: Nino Pagot; Toni Pagot; Ignazio Colnaghi
- Voiced by: Ignazio Colnaghi; Davide Garbolino (2013–present); Uti Hof (1970–1972, English)

In-universe information
- Species: Chicken
- Gender: Male
- Family: Gallettoni (father); Cesira (mother)
- Origin: Italy

- Calimero

カリメロ (Karimero)
- Anime television series
- Directed by: Yūgo Serikawa
- Studio: Organizzazione Pagot; Toei Animation
- Original network: ANN (NET)
- Original run: October 15, 1974 – September 30, 1975
- Episodes: 47
- Anime television series
- Directed by: Tsuneo Tominaga; Shigeru Ueda
- Music by: Junnosuke Yamamoto
- Studio: Telescreen
- Original network: TXN (TV Tokyo)
- Original run: October 15, 1992 – September 9, 1993
- Episodes: 52
- Anime television series
- Studio: Gaumont Animation; Studio Campedelli
- Original network: TF1 (France); Rai 2 (Italy); TXN (TV Tokyo) (Japan)
- English network: UK/AUS: Disney Junior
- Original run: October 7, 2013 – September 25, 2016
- Episodes: 104

Calimero is an animated television series about a charming but hapless anthropomorphized chicken; the only black one in a family of yellow chickens. He wears half of his egg shell still on his head. Calimero originally appeared on the Italian television show Carosello on July 14, 1963, and soon became a popular icon in Italy.

The characters were created by the animation studio Organizzazione Pagot and originated as a series of animated advertisements for Miralanza AVA soap products shown throughout Italy. The creators of the main character were Nino Pagot, Toni Pagot and Ignazio Colnaghi. At the end of each episode, it turns out that Calimero is not actually black, but only very dirty, and becomes white after being washed by the advertised soap products.

The characters were later licensed in Japan as an anime series twice, titled Calimero (カリメロ, Karimero). The first was produced by K&S and animated by Toei Animation and ran from October 15, 1972, to September 30, 1975; the second, with new settings and characters, was made by Telescreen in 1992. Altogether, 99 Japanese episodes were made (47 in the 1972 Toei series, and 52 in the 1992 Telescreen series). The series mostly consists of the many adventures of Calimero and his friends as they solve mysteries and make documentaries. However, their adventures usually get them into quite a bit of trouble. English dubbed versions for the first two anime series were never officially released, though dubbed pilot episodes do exist. However, the series did come out in other languages. The original 1970s shorts and the third CGI series were released in English, however. The first series was also broadcast on European networks such as TROS (The Netherlands), TF1 (France), ZDF and RTL II (Germany) or TVE (Spain).

A third animation series about the character in computer animation premiered in TF1 in 2013. The production team includes France's Gaumont Animation, rights owner Milan, Italy's Studio Campedelli and Japanese partners TV Tokyo and Kodansha. The series also aired on several other TV channels, including on Disney Junior in the United Kingdom and Australia.

== Characters ==
=== 1974 series ===
- Calimero (カリメロ) – The titular protagonist of the show. Calimero is voiced by Katsue Miwa in Japanese and Liz MacRae in English.
- Priscilla (プリシラ) – Calimero's girlfriend, a shy bird with common sense. Priscilla is voiced by Michiko Nomura and Reiko Katsura in Japanese and Aimée Castle in English.
- Peter Jobatta (ピーター ジョバッタ, Papero Piero in the Italian original spot) – Peter is voiced by Kaneta Kimotsuki in Japanese and Rick Jones in English.
- Buta (ブータ) – Buta is voiced by Masako Nozawa.
- Deppa (デッパ) – Deppa is voiced by Sachiko Chijimatsu.
- Calimero's mother (カリメロの母, Cesira in the Italian original spot) – Calimero's mother is voiced by Masako Nozawa.
- Calimero's father (カリメロの父, Gallettoni in the Italian original spot) – Calimero's father is voiced by Ken'ichi Ogata.
- Mr. Owl (フクロウ先生) – Mr. Owl is voiced by Jōji Yanami.

=== 1992 series ===
- Calimero – Calimero is voiced by Shinobu Adachi.
- Priscilla – Priscilla is voiced by Akemi Okamura.
- Peter (ピーター) – Peter is voiced by Akirasa Ōmori.
- Giuliano (Peanut in English dub pilot) (ジュリアーノ) – Giuliano is voiced by Yūji Ueda.
- Susie (スージー) – a wealthy girl duck. Susie is voiced by Natsumi Sasaki.
- Roshita (ロシータ) – Roshita is voiced by Hiroko Kasahara.
- Pepe (ペペ) – Pepe is voiced by Masashi Ebara.

=== 2013 series ===
- Calimero – Voiced by: Rachel Berger (English) / Fanny Bloc (French) / Ayaka Asai (Japanese)
- Priscilla -Voiced by: Naïke Fauveau (French) / Rumi Ōkubo (Japanese)
- Giuliano (Valeriano in UK English dub)- Voiced by Georges de Vitis (French) / Kokoro Kikuchi (Japanese)
- Peter (Pierrot in UK English dub) – Voiced by: Pascal Sellem (French) / Tōru Sakurai (Japanese)
- Susie – Voiced by: Ren Kato (Japanese)
- Pepe – Voiced by: Tōmoyuki Maruyama (Japanese)

== Legacy ==
=== Mobile game ===
A mobile game titled Calimero's Village was released for iOS and Android on May 7, 2015; developed by BulkyPix in partnership with Gaumont Animation. Set in the village of Hatchington, the game follows Calimero as he builds a new life and reunites with friends from the Calimero's universe. Players begin by constructing Calimero's house and a mill, and can later expand the town with houses, roads, crops, gardens, and other buildings. The app also includes five mini-games where you can earn coins and experience. At release, the game was sold for €2.99.

== Impact in popular culture ==
The main character in the anime series has had a lasting impact in the vocabulary of some countries, either because of his looks, with an egg shell on his head, or because of his frequent complaining about being unfairly treated by others:

- Calimero is the name and subject of a Welsh language song by the band Super Furry Animals
- French singer Brigitte Fontaine collaborated with the band Stereolab on a song of the same name
- In the Netherlands and Belgium, the term "Calimerocomplex" is used to denote people who are staunchly convinced that their position as an underdog is due to their smaller size, either literally or symbolically, which covers up for their own shortcomings. Often the character's lines from the show are cited, "They are big and I is [sic] small and that is not fair, oh no!" (translated back from Dutch, with intentional error).
- The slang nickname during the 1970s and 1980s for military policemen in the Israeli Army was Calimero, due to their egg-shaped white helmet; the same was the case in Spain, where calimero was also a name for a type of helmet for motorbikers.
- In parts of Yugoslavia, the Polski Fiat 126p was nicknamed Kalimero in reference to the character.
- Italian luxury fashion house Bottega Veneta introduced the "Kalimero" bucket bag in 2022, taking inspiration from the bindle that the character carries.
