= Transona Five =

Transona Five are a Dallas, Texas-based American space rock or indie rock band that began playing together in 1995, and was named after a song on the Mars Audiac Quintet album by Stereolab.

The group was part of the lively Denton-area space rock scene that occurred in the mid- to late-nineties, together with bands like Mazinga Phaser and Skiptracer. Founding members included Chris Anderson (lead vocals, guitar), Chris Foley (guitar, vocals), Annika Morgan (bass), and G. P. Cole (drums). Rachel Smith (keyboard, vocals, guitar) joined the following year. After the group's first EP, Melatonin Bullet, Morgan was replaced by Scott Marks (bass, vocals, trombone). Chris Foley left the band after the Duffel Bag album, reducing the group to a four-piece. The band toured occasionally throughout the late 1990s, performing in venues throughout the United States (primarily Texas and the Northeast). Rachel Smith quit the band in 2000 to work on The Lickets. Transona Five went on an extended hiatus in 2000, shortly after most of the band's members moved to the East Coast.

Band member Chris Foley died in January 2007 . In 2009 Anderson, Morgan, and Cole began recording new material under the name A Tandem Bike.

In 2017 Sonic Surgery Records released a double LP collection of their previous work.

== Discography ==
- "Mariposa/Reconstitute" 7-inch Sandwich Records (1996)
- "Melatonin Bullet" EP Sandwich Records (1997)
- "No Door" 7-inch Sleepin Corporate (1997)
- "Duffel Bag" Sandwich Records (1998)
- "Going Away" EP Drawing Room Records (1999)
- Transona Five [Sonic Surgery Records] (2017)
