= Ignazio Colnaghi =

Italian actor (1924–2017)

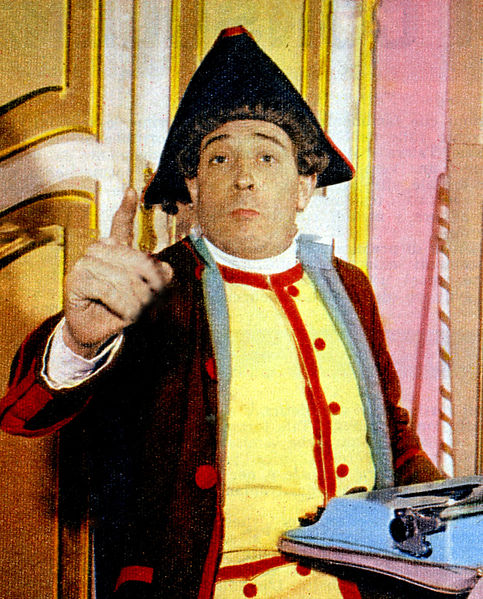
- Born: 2 February 1924; Milan, Italy
- Died: 25 November 2017 (aged 93); Milan, Italy
- Occupations: Voice Actor, Actor
- Years active: 1956-2008

Ignazio Colnaghi (2 February 1924 – 25 November 2017) was an Italian actor. He mainly voiced Calimero for the Italian advertising show Carosello.

== Bibliography ==
- Ignazio Colnaghi at IMDb
