= Crumb Duck =

EP by Stereolab & Nurse with Wound
- Released: October 1993
- Labels: Clawfist (UK); United Dairies (UK)
- Producers: Steven Stapleton; Steve Mack

Stereolab & Nurse with Wound chronology
| Crumb Duck (1993) | Simple Headphone Mind (1997) |

Stereolab chronology
| Transient Random-Noise Bursts with Announcements (1993) | Crumb Duck (1993) | Jenny Ondioline (1993) |

Professional ratings
Review scores
| Source | Rating |
|---|---|
| AllMusic | 2.5/5 stars |

Crumb Duck is the first collaboration between Anglo-French indie band Stereolab and cult avant-garde unit Nurse with Wound, first released on 10" vinyl on the Clawfist label in 1993.

Stereolab guitarist Tim Gane detailed the circumstances surrounding this collaboration to The Wire in 1997 (issue 164) whilst undertaking the magazine's "Invisible Jukebox" feature (alongside Lætitia Sadier). Gane stated that he had invited sole permanent NWW member Steven Stapleton to produce Stereolab's debut album (later released as Peng!). However, Gane stated that Stapleton had refused on the grounds that the group were "too rock" but had agreed to undertake a remix for the group instead. Stapleton surprised Gane by producing a letter he had written to NWW some years previously, which he had marked as the 15th piece of correspondence he had received regarding his group (also The Wire, issue 164). According to a newsletter issued by Stereolab's Duophonic Records, part of the agreement was that Stereolab would not get to hear the finished results until after the record had been pressed and released.

"Exploding Head Movie" is a Stapleton remix of a section of the 18-minute album version of the "Jenny Ondioline" single (as heard on Transient Random-Noise Bursts with Announcements). "Animal or Vegetable (A Wonderful Wooden Reason ......)" saw Stapleton playing the vocal track in reverse and adding several layers of wild distorted guitar to the lengthy middle section before applying his familiar tape collage methods to the coda. The original version of this track has not been released. An homage to the German group Faust is provided by the subtitle to "Animal or Vegetable" – "A Wonderful Wooden Reason." The latter references a line from the lyrics of "Meadow Meal," a track on Faust's first album self-titled Faust (1971). Stapleton provided the distinctive cover image but around 30 copies came with sleeves hand drawn by members of Stereolab.

Stereolab later included both tracks on their Refried Ectoplasm compilation which remains in print. NWW, for their part, issued a Crumb Duck CD, adding 2 tracks from a 7" single NWW had previously issued on the Clawfist label and an outtake. A vinyl edition of this expanded reissue was also made available but both formats went out of print when NWW's distributor, World Serpent Distribution, went out of business. NWW also included "Animal Or Vegetable" on their The Swinging Reflective compilation.

They would collaborate a second time in 1997 with the release of Simple Headphone Mind.

== Track listing ==
=== Side one ===
1. "Animal or Vegetable (A Wonderful Wooden Reason ......)" (Tim Gane, Laetitia Sadier, Steve Stapleton) – 13:34

=== Side two ===
1. "Exploding Head Movie" (Gane, Sadier) – 4:48

=== CD reissue ===
1. "Steel Dream March of the Metal Men" – 5:39
2. "The Dadda's Intoxication" – 6:25
3. "Exploding Head Movie" – 4:48
4. "Animal or Vegetable (A Wonderful Wooden Reason ......)" – 13:34
5. "A New Dress (remix)" – 9:43

(Only tracks 3 and 4 feature Stereolab; all other tracks by Nurse With Wound.)

== Personnel ==
Nurse With Wound

- Steve Stapleton – Organ, Guitar, Harmonica, Percussion, Loops, *Mixing, Pedals, Tapes, Ring Modulator, Generator
- Colin Potter – Sound Manipulation, Engineer, Mixing

Stereolab

- Laetitia Sadier – Vocals
- Mary Hansen – Vocals
- Tim Gane – Guitar, Farfisa Organ
- Sean O'Hagan – Organ
- Andy Ramsey – Drums

Additional musicians

- David Kenny – Guitar, Engineer, Mixing on "Animal or Vegetable (A Wonderful Wooden Reason)"
- Barry McCarus – Performer on "A New Dress (Remix)"

Production

- Steve Mack – Engineer
- Denis Blackham – Mastering
- Babs Santini – Cover Art
