= Fluorescences =

EP by Stereolab
- Released: 18 November 1996
- Genre: Post-rock
- Length: 27:56 (extended version)
- Label: Duophonic

Stereolab chronology
| Emperor Tomato Ketchup (1996) | Fluorescences (1996) | Dots and Loops (1997) |

Professional ratings
Review scores
| Source | Rating |
|---|---|
| AllMusic | 4/5 stars |

Fluorescences is an EP by the group Stereolab, released in November 1996. All four of its tracks were later re-released on the Oscillons from the Anti-Sun compilation.

The title track was voted number 20 in John Peel's Festive Fifty for 1996, and held the same position in 1997.

== Track listing ==
1. "Fluorescences" – 3:23
2. "Pinball" – 3:13
3. "You Used to Call Me Sadness" – 5:10
4. "Soop Groove #1" – 13:06
