= Music for the Amorphous Body Study Center =

EP by Stereolab
- Released: 17 April 1995
- Recorded: London, 1995
- Genres: Post-rock; lounge; art pop
- Length: 23:24
- Label: Duophonic
- Producer: Stereolab

Stereolab chronology
Wow and Flutter (1994)	Music for the Amorphous Body Study Center (1995)	Refried Ectoplasm: Switched On, Vol. 2 (1995)

Professional ratings
Review scores
Source	Rating
AllMusic	link

Music for the Amorphous Body Study Center is an EP by Stereolab, created in collaboration with New York sculptor Charles Long. The songs became part of Long's exhibit, complementing each of his sculptures. The album was initially available only at the exhibit in a pressing of 1500; another limited pressing was later released in stores but it is now out of print. All tracks were included in the compilation album Aluminum Tunes: Switched On, Vol. 3.

== Track listing ==
No.	Title	Length
1.	"Pop Quiz"	4:22
2.	"The Extension Trip"	3:44
3.	"How to Play Your Internal Organs Overnight"	3:59
4.	"The Brush Descends the Length"	3:09
5.	"Melochord Seventy-Five"	3:39
6.	"Space Moment"	2:42
7.	Untitled	1:37

The untitled track is an instrumental reprise of "The Extension Trip". On the Aluminum Tunes compilation, tracks 6 and 7 are combined into one track.
