= Chemical Chords =

Studio album by Stereolab
- Released: 18 August 2008
- Recorded: 2007
- Studio: Instant Zero (France); Press Play (London)
- Genre: Indie pop; lounge
- Length: 48:09
- Label: 4AD; Duophonic

Stereolab chronology
Serene Velocity (2006)	Chemical Chords (2008)	Not Music (2010)

Singles from Chemical Chords
- 1. "Three Women" Released: 28 April 2008

Professional ratings
Aggregate scores
Source	Rating
Metacritic	72/100
Review scores
Source	Rating
AllMusic	4/5 stars
The A.V. Club	B+
Drowned in Sound	8/10
The Guardian	3/5 stars
The Irish Times	4/5 stars
Mojo	3/5 stars
Pitchfork	8.1/10
Spin	4/5 stars
Uncut	3/5 stars
XLR8R	7/10

Chemical Chords is the ninth studio album by English-French rock band Stereolab, released on 18 August 2008 by 4AD and Duophonic Records.

== Track listing ==
All tracks are written by Lætitia Sadier and Tim Gane, except where noted

No.	Title	Writer(s)	Length
1.	"Neon Beanbag"		3:49
2.	"Three Women"		3:46
3.	"One Finger Symphony"		2:05
4.	"Chemical Chords"		5:12
5.	"The Ecstatic Static"		4:44
6.	"Valley Hi!"		2:14
7.	"Silver Sands"		3:08
8.	"Pop Molecule (Molecular Pop 1)"	Gane	2:15
9.	"Self Portrait with 'Electric Brain'"		3:16
10.	"Nous vous demandons pardon"		4:52
11.	"Cellulose Sunshine"		2:36
12.	"Fractal Dream of a Thing"		3:37
13.	"Daisy Click Clack"		3:28
14.	"Vortical Phonotheque"		3:07
Total length:			48:09

iTunes Store edition bonus track
No.	Title	Length
15.	"Spool of Collusion"	2:12
Total length:		50:21

Japanese edition bonus tracks
No.	Title	Length
15.	"The Nth Degrees"	4:13
16.	"Magne-Music"	3:53
17.	"Spool of Collusion"	2:10
Total length:		58:25

UK limited edition bonus tracks
No.	Title	Length
15.	"The Nth Degrees"	4:13
16.	"Magne-Music"	3:53
Total length:		56:15

== Personnel ==
Credits are adapted from the album's liner notes.

Stereolab

- Tim Gane – guitar, bass, drums
- Lætitia Sadier – vocals
- Simon Johns – bass
- Andy Ramsay – drums, drum machine, electronics
- Joe Walters – French horn
- Joe Watson – keyboards, vibraphone, electronics, drums

Additional musicians

- Steve Hamilton – brass
- Sally Herbert – strings
- Marcus Holdaway – strings
- Dave Liddell – brass
- Laura Melhuish – strings
- Sean O'Hagan – string and brass arrangements
- Brian Wright – strings

Production

- Bo Kondren (credited as "Bo") – mastering
- Hans Schaaf (credited as "Hans") – mastering (assistant)
- Stereolab (credited as "The Groop") – mixing
- Joe Watson – mixing, recording

Design

- House – artwork

== Charts ==
Chart (2008)	Peak position
Irish Albums (IRMA)	69
Japanese Albums (Oricon)	163
UK Albums (OCC)	102
UK Independent Albums (OCC)	10
US Billboard 200	170
US Heatseekers Albums (Billboard)	7
US Independent Albums (Billboard)	24
