= Wow and Flutter =

EP by Stereolab
- Released: 20 October 1994
- Length: 17:31
- Label: Duophonic; Elektra

Stereolab chronology
Mars Audiac Quintet (1994)	Wow and Flutter (1994)	Music for the Amorphous Body Study Center (1995)

Professional ratings
Review scores
Source	Rating
Allmusic	3/5 stars

Wow and Flutter is an EP by the post-rock band Stereolab, which served as the second single from their 1994 album Mars Audiac Quintet. A limited edition of 3,000 7" copies was released with hand-painted covers. The EP was also released on CD and 10" vinyl.

Two of the tracks are alternative versions of songs on Mars Audiac Quintet. "Wow and Flutter" itself is a re-recording, while "Nihilist Assault Group, Pts. 3-5" comprises sections excised from the album version, which was originally planned to be a side-long suite similar in concept to the 18-minute "Jenny Ondioline" on Transient Random-Noise Bursts with Announcements.

== Track listing ==
1. "Wow and Flutter" – 3:07
2. "Heavy Denim" – 2:49
3. "Nihilist Assault Group, Pts. 3–5" – 7:12
4. "Narco Martenot" – 4:23

All tracks appear on the Oscillons from the Anti-Sun 2005 compilation album.

== Sources ==
- "Wow and Flutter [EP]". Stereolab. All Media Guide/All Music.
- "wow and flutter". Stereolab Official Site. Stereolab.
