= Refried Ectoplasm =

Compilation album by Stereolab
- Released: July 1995
- Length: 62:56
- Labels: Duophonic (UK); Drag City (US); Flying Nun (New Zealand)

Stereolab chronology
Music for the Amorphous Body Study Center (1995)	Refried Ectoplasm (1995)	Cybele's Reverie (1996)

Stereolab Switched On chronology
Switched On (1992)	Refried Ectoplasm (1995)	Aluminum Tunes (1998)

Refried Ectoplasm (Switched On Volume 2), released in July 1995, is a compilation by Stereolab of singles and rarities.

== Reception ==
Professional ratings
Review scores
Source	Rating
AllMusic	4.5/5 stars
Pitchfork	8.2/10
New Rolling Stone Album Guide	3.5/5 stars

The Rolling Stone Album Guide referred to Refried Ectoplasm as "offer[ing] some of Stereolab's most experimental material, and occasionally—as with Refried's early singles ('Lo Boob Oscillator')—some of the group's more accessible tracks as well." Stephen Thomas Erlewine of AllMusic gave the album a 4.5 out of five rating, stating that the album is "far more than a mere oddities collection. More than any other album, Refried Ectoplasm charts Stereolab's astonishing musical growth between those three years, and offers several definitive songs – including 'Lo Boob Oscillator', 'French Disko', and 'John Cage Bubblegum'."

== Track listing ==
No.	Title	Source	Length
1.	"Harmonium"	A-side of 7-inch single, Duophonic Super 45s (1992)	5:55
2.	"Lo Boob Oscillator"	A-side of 7-inch single, Sub Pop (1993)	6:36
3.	"Mountain"	Split single with Unrest, TeenBeat Records (1993)	4:05
4.	"Revox"	Double pack 7-inch split single with Huggy Bear & Colm and Darlin', Duophonic Super 45s (1993)	4:13
5.	"French Disko"	A-side of 7-inch and CD single, Duophonic (1993)	3:35
6.	"Exploding Head Movie"	Crumb Duck 10-inch split EP with Nurse With Wound, Clawfist (1993)	4:48
7.	"Eloge d'Eros"	B-side of "John Cage Bubblegum" single (1993)	3:52
8.	"Tone Burst (Country)"	Previously unissued, from abandoned 7-inch split with Spectrum (1993)	2:12
9.	""Animal or Vegetable (A Wonderful Wooden Reason...)""	Crumb Duck 10-inch split EP with Nurse With Wound, Clawfist (1993)	13:32
10.	"John Cage Bubblegum"	A-side of 7-inch single, Slumberland Records (1993)	3:18
11.	"Sadistic"	Previously unreleased	2:36
12.	"Farfisa"	B-side of "Harmonium" single (1992)	2:23
13.	"Tempter"	B-side of "Lo Boob Oscillator" (1993)	5:52
Total length:			63:04
