= Dots and Loops =

Studio album by Stereolab
- Released: 22 September 1997
- Recorded: March–April 1997
- Studios: Idful, Chicago, Illinois; Academy of St. Martin in the Street, Düsseldorf, Germany
- Genres: Art pop; experimental pop; ambient pop; post-rock; lounge; easy listening
- Length: 65:52
- Languages: English; French
- Labels: Duophonic; Elektra
- Producers: John McEntire; Andi Toma; Stereolab

Stereolab chronology
Fluorescences (1996)	Dots and Loops (1997)	Miss Modular (1997)

Singles from Dots and Loops
- 1. "Miss Modular" Released: 1 September 1997

Dots and Loops is the fifth studio album by English-French rock band Stereolab. It was released on 22 September 1997 and was issued by Duophonic Records and Elektra Records. The band co-produced the album with John McEntire and Andi Toma, and recording took place at their respective studios in Chicago and Düsseldorf. It was produced with Pro Tools, making it the band's first album to utilize a digital audio workstation.

The album features less emphasis on the krautrock and drone rock styles that the band had been known for, opting instead to further explore jazz and electronic sounds with additional influences drawn from bossa nova and 1960s pop music. Its lyrics address matters such as consumerism, the "spectacle", materialism, and human interaction.

Dots and Loops reached number 19 on the UK Albums Chart, as well as number 111 on the Billboard 200 chart in the United States. The track "Miss Modular" was issued as a single and as an EP, and peaked at number 60 on the UK Singles Chart. Several music critics have praised Dots and Loops for its blend of accessible music with experimental and avant-garde sounds, and some have considered it to be one of the band's finest works. The album was reissued in 2019 with an extra disc of bonus material.

== Background and recording ==
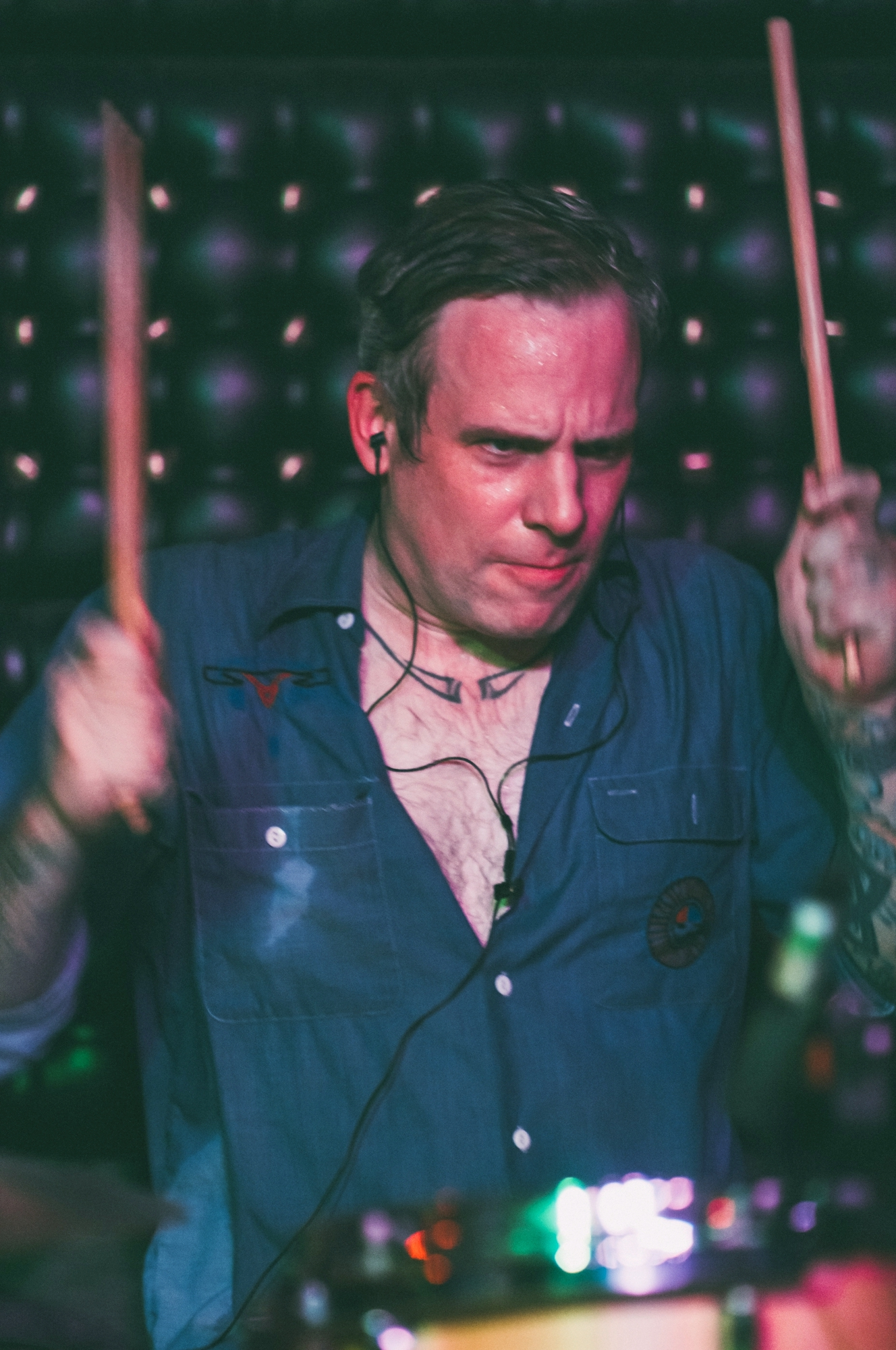
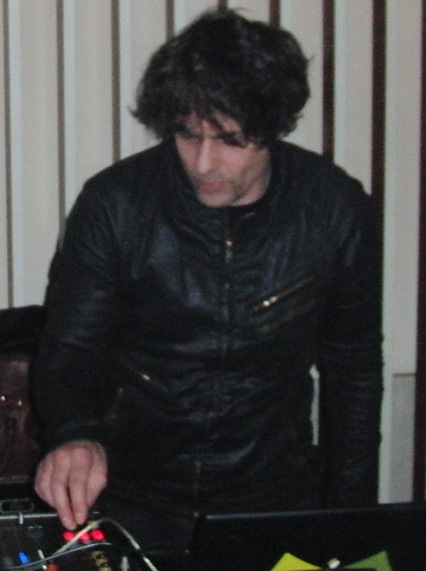
Dots and Loops was co-produced by John McEntire (left) and Andi Toma (right)

Seven of the ten tracks on Dots and Loops were recorded by Stereolab in March 1997 at the Chicago studio Idful Music Corporation with John McEntire, who also produced and mixed the tracks with the band. The remaining three tracks – "The Flower Called Nowhere", "Prisoner of Mars", and "Contronatura" – were recorded the following month at Academy of St. Martin in the Street in Düsseldorf, this time with co-production, co-mixing, and engineering duties overseen by Andi Toma. Additional engineering was undertaken by Max Stamm and Toma's Mouse on Mars bandmate Jan St. Werner. The band's songwriter and guitarist Tim Gane said that McEntire allowed the band to "make the music we wanted ourselves and never tried to take over when things weren't working". Stereolab also stayed at the Düsseldorf studio, where Stamm would make the band breakfast and bring them newspapers. Stereolab recorded the song "I Feel the Air (Of Another Planet)" for the album, but it was not mixed in time for the mastering process and instead appeared on the band's 2000 EP The First of the Microbe Hunters.

In the first Chicago sessions, Stereolab attempted to record straight-to-tape as they did with previous albums. McEntire and drummer Andy Ramsay were dissatisfied with how the drums sounded and decided to try recording them in loops with Pro Tools, which had been recently installed in the studio's computer. The drums were first recorded on tape and the playback was digitally recorded. Gane said in 2019, "making lots of little loops of the bass, guitar and the drum parts, not having to play everything through from beginning to end, plopping things in where you wanted them and moving things around to see how it sounded. We loved it!" The band's singer and lyricist Lætitia Sadier also said, "With the new technology, you make up a new way of doing things".

The album's title references both Norman McLaren's 1940 animated short films Dots and Loops, and the band recording with a digital audio workstation at the time. Its artwork was designed by Julian House.

== Musical style ==
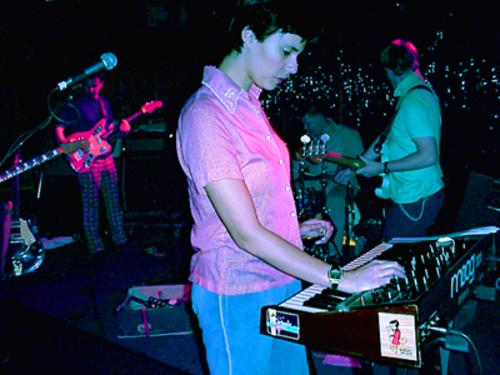
Stereolab performing in 1999

In Dots and Loops, Stereolab departed from the strict krautrock and drone rock styles that the band were known for. In a 1997 interview, Sadier joked that listeners would be tired of their use of drones; "Imagine if, on our ninth album, we were still doing drones." Alex Hudson of Exclaim! analyzed this shift in the band's aesthetic, noting that "if there's any krautrock to be found here, it's not the motorik pulse of Neu! but the freaky, funky jazz exploration of Can." AllMusic critic Stephen Thomas Erlewine characterized Dots and Loops as belonging to the leftfield indie subgenre ambient pop.

According to Erlewine, Dots and Loops draws from bossa nova, jazz and 1960s pop music. Barney Hoskyns of Rolling Stone found that the album continued Stereolab's progression towards a lighter sound that he termed "avant-easy listening", while Michelle Goldberg of Metro referred to it as the band's "lounge apotheosis". Treble writer Jeff Terich noted the "more lush" quality of the music on Dots and Loops compared to Stereolab's previous work, characterising it as "gorgeously orchestrated" art pop.

Erlewine observed that Stereolab "concentrated on layered compositions" on Dots and Loops. He described the band's interplay on the album as edging "closer to jazz than rock, exploring all of the possibilities of any melodic phrase." Pitchfork's Eric Harvey said that Dots and Loops exemplified the "recombinant pop" aesthetic that arose in the 1990s, which saw rock musicians embracing the "looped, sampled and collaged" production techniques of electronic and hip-hop. The Village Voice writer Barry Walters describes the band's bassist Richard Harrison, as "tak[ing] a bebop approach to the band's bottom," and also with Ramsay "provid[ing] a live alternative to dance music's ubiquitous samples and programmed percussion." The album frequently makes use of 5/4 time signatures, including on the tracks "Diagonals", "Rainbo Conversation", and "Parsec".

Gane wrote much of the composition on Dots and Loops, including horn arrangements, on a guitar. He used an EMS Vocoder on many of the album's instruments, including matched-up guitar and drum playing for a "boing-boing, bouncy rhythmic sound." He used a Studio Electronics ATC-1 analogue synth module for a nylon string guitar, which gave it a "wibbly, wobbly, water sound." Meanwhile, owing to the sound palette St. Werner had been continuing to develop as part of Mouse on Mars, he and Toma contributed sound processing and electronic loops which Gane nicknamed "insect horns"; Sadier features on the duo's track "Schnick Schnack Meltmade" from their album Autoditacker, released in the same year. On the tenth track "Contranatura", these "insect horns" were layered and then loaded into an Emagic Notator to be sequenced. Gane also processed hi-hats through synthesizers and a noise gate which he routed to his guitar. The extra track "Bonus Beats" from the album's 2019 expanded edition is a recording of Ramsay experimenting with a drum machine.

== Themes ==
The lyrics for Dots and Loops, as with most Stereolab albums are written in both English and French, sung by Sadier who also trades her vocals with bandmate Mary Hansen. According to Sophie Kemp of Vice, Dots and Loops is informed by Stereolab's "ideology" of "tackling both despotism and exploring the artistic boundaries of living by capitalism", with the album seeing Sadier commenting on "different fears about the world in every track". Kemp found that these themes are complemented by the album's "sprightly spirit", interpreting the "serene" quality of the music as a "critique on the numbness of society and how the more comfortable we get with capitalism, the more jaded we become to pain and suffering."

"Miss Modular"
Sample of the track "Miss Modular", with its lyrics regarding the "Spectacle".

Eric Harvey suggested that the song "Brakhage", named after avant-garde filmmaker Stan Brakhage, concerns both "consumerist desire" and, reflexively, "the sheer amount of studio gadgets required to make the album itself." The lyrics to "Miss Modular" regard the Situationist theory of the "spectacle", and "the commercial magic of pop music itself." "The Flower Called Nowhere" is about "harbor-bound boats never desiring to 'break free and sail'". "Diagonals" discusses "the materialistic escapism of the bourgeois European holiday." "Rainbo Conversation" is about revolution beginning "in the bedroom", where "nothing is more political than the personal". "Refractions in the Plastic Pulse" regards "human interaction amid the spectacle". "Contronatura" is an anti-war "dialogue between friends" which "calls for a quiet rebellion against nature [...] and our baser natures", and later shifts "to a political tract that captures the album's mystifying artificial/natural spirit in its final moments".

== Composition ==
Dots and Loops opens with the track "Brakhage", which in its first seconds "sputter[s] to life like [...] a vintage receiver", and is afterwards anchored by the distinctly minimalist form of a two-chord keyboard line and "skittering drum and vibraphone loops". "Miss Modular" is built on a two-chord pattern augmented by brass arranged by Sean O'Hagan, and finds Gane using the acoustic guitar "as a percussive element" to complement Andy Ramsay's looped drumming. The following track, "The Flower Called Nowhere", is a waltz which according to Gane recreates "that [style of] mid/late 60s European exploitation film music with the rolling harpsichords, trap drums [and] ethereal vocals". He also said that the song took inspiration from composer Krzysztof Komeda and incorporates a choral chant from Komeda's score for the 1967 film The Fearless Vampire Killers.

"Diagonals" pairs drums run through a Bode frequency shifter pattern, a marimba loop and a brass section. This is followed by a vocoded guitar locked in with drums and "fizzy" vocals. The drums in the intro are believed to be sampled from Amon Düül II's "I Can't Wait", though this has never been confirmed. "Prisoner of Mars" features acoustic guitar and electronic sounds from Mouse on Mars member Jan St. Werner. It has described as having "an Astrud Gilberto-style" which "reveal[s] ultra-spartan techno-rhumba undercarriage." The next track "Rainbo Conversation", with "two chord pounding pianos", uses the same chords as "The Flower Called Nowhere", but according to Gane, sounded more similar to Michel Legrand, Francis Lai and the theme for Panorama.

"Refractions in the Plastic Pulse" is a four-part track characterised by sharing a "common ground between IDM, calypso, and classical." It begins with "murky vibes, flat Farfisa pads, bossa-nova guitar and Brian Wilson bass", then "mutat[es] into snarled-up space-rock and metallic junglism – then back to its jaunty original refrain." "Parsec" is a samba-tinged drum and bass track with a "peaceful dub break." The ninth track, "Ticker-Tape of the Unconscious", opens with a sample of "Divino, Maravilhoso" by Gal Costa and "lays trancey vibes and brass over Stevie Wonder funk". Album closer "Contronatura" starts with a subdued, minimalist melody in which St. Werner's "insect horns" are gradually overlaid, and after a two-minute interlude purely consisting of his glitch-based sound design, the song progresses into a second section influenced by disco, with its heavy beat featuring a funky guitar line combined with electronic percussion, drum machines and a drum kit.

== Release ==
Professional ratings
Contemporary reviews
Review scores
Source	Rating
Chicago Tribune	3/4 stars
Entertainment Weekly	A
The Guardian	4/5 stars
Los Angeles Times	3/4 stars
NME	8/10
Orlando Sentinel	4/4 stars
Pitchfork	8.5/10 (1997)
Rolling Stone	3.5/5 stars
Spin	8/10
The Village Voice	B

Dots and Loops was released on 22 September 1997 in the United Kingdom by Duophonic Records, peaking at number 19 on the UK Albums Chart. In the United States, it was released on 23 September 1997 by Elektra Records, becoming Stereolab's first entry on the Billboard 200 chart, where it peaked at number 111; by August 1999, it had sold over 75,000 copies in the country.

Prior to the album's release, "Miss Modular" was issued on 1 September 1997 as a single (on 7" vinyl) and as an EP (on CD and 12" vinyl), reaching number 60 on the UK Singles Chart. The song's music video was directed and produced by Nick Abrahams and Mikey Tomkins. The track "Parsec" was later used in commercials for the then-newly launched Volkswagen New Beetle. A remastered and expanded edition of Dots and Loops, featuring a second disc containing demos and instrumental mixes of the album's songs, was released on 13 September 2019 by Duophonic and Warp as part of Stereolab's back catalogue reissue campaign.

=== Critical reception ===
Reviewing Dots and Loops in 1997, The Guardian's Kathy Sweeney considered the album a successful move towards a more accessible and "pop-conscious" sound, with Stereolab's "avant-garde tendencies and atonal drone of old supplanted by breezy harmonies and, wait for it, tunes." Tom Sinclair of Entertainment Weekly said that it "finds them at the top of their game, successfully brokering the seeming shotgun marriage of easy listening and acute intellect." NME writer Stephen Dalton stated that the band "have never sounded so comfortable in a pop setting than on Dots and Loops", which he deemed "both more accessible and more adventurous" than their previous album Emperor Tomato Ketchup. Parry Gettelman of Orlando Sentinel wrote that with the album, "The group sometimes sounds as ethereal as Angelo Badalamenti, while other times it seems to strive to become the perfect fusion of Michel Legrand and Les Baxter." He also praised Sadier's vocals for having an "old-fashioned gentleness and a relaxed quality reminiscent of Brazilian samba singers." Terri Sutton of Spin praised the music as Stereolab's "most audacious" to date, and Los Angeles Times critic Lorraine Ali commented that the band "continues to revitalize Muzak for the '90s." In The Village Voice, Robert Christgau was more critical, finding that "the tunes fall off and the wacky smarts lose the charm of surprise." At the end of 1997, Dots and Loops was named among the best albums of the year by several publications, including Melody Maker, Mojo, NME, and The Wire. It also placed at number 28 in The Village Voice's Pazz & Jop critics' poll.

== Legacy ==
Professional ratings
Retrospective reviews
Review scores
Source	Rating
AllMusic	4/5 stars
Paste	8.8/10
Pitchfork	9.2/10 (2017)
Uncut	8/10

Dots and Loops is Stereolab's most commercially successful album. Sam Walton of Loud and Quiet wrote, "As Britpop dwindled, [Dots and Loops] offered teenagers who had cut their teeth on Blur v Oasis, now a couple of years older and more curious, an accessible British-based shortcut into a world of collage, crate-digging and electronica beyond the walls of Beatles/Stones rock-music hegemony." In his retrospective review of the album for Pitchfork, Eric Harvey praised Dots and Loops as Stereolab's "peak", finding them "embracing the bleeding edge of digital studio technology" and creating "a work both of its moment and [...] that seems to hover outside everything else." Louis Pattison of Uncut described it as being "a touch less immediate" than Emperor Tomato Ketchup, remarking on its "laid-back and loungier" mood, while noting that it captured Stereolab in their "imperial phase". Bill Pearis of BrooklynVegan also credited Sean O'Hagan's string and brass arrangements in Dots and Loops as "a big part of the album's appeal."

Among other examples from the genre's first wave, Exclaim!'s I. Khider cited Dots and Loops as a "definitive" post-rock recording in which it was "arguable that the abstract and repetitive elements of contemporary club culture has a hand in this music." Writing for the same magazine, Alex Hudson commended the band for "deliver[ing] some of their most accessible pop without sacrificing any of their experimental impulses." For Vice, Sophie Kemp called Dots and Loops "a major milestone in the world of experimental pop, and within Stereolab's expansive discography", deeming it the band's "most sonically accessible and politically important record."

Erlewine and Saby Reyes-Kulkarni of Paste reviewed the 2019 expanded edition of Dots and Loops positively, with Erlewine writing that it "uphold[s] Stereolab's reputation for giving fans a complete look at their music", while Reyes-Kulkarni wrote, "It’s always a risky proposition when bands release crude demos, but in this case, the skeletal building blocks of Gane and Sadier’s parts paint a picture of songs with plenty of breathing room and promise." Gane said in an interview with The Guardian in the same year that he had complicated feelings on the production of Dots and Loops, saying that it was "a bit too sophisticated"; in his terms, the electronic elements "gave it a bit much of a laid-back, ersatz feel. The computer has ruined rock music in a way, because it makes it too polite [...] Hip-hop and electronic music have dealt with this problem very, very well – rock music hasn't."

== Track listing ==
All tracks are written by Tim Gane and Lætitia Sadier, except where noted.

No.	Title	Writer(s)	Length
1.	"Brakhage"		5:30
2.	"Miss Modular"		4:29
3.	"The Flower Called Nowhere"		4:55
4.	"Diagonals"		5:15
5.	"Prisoner of Mars"		4:03
6.	"Rainbo Conversation"		4:46
7.	"Refractions in the Plastic Pulse"	Gane; Sadier; Andy Ramsay	17:32
8.	"Parsec"		5:34
9.	"Ticker-Tape of the Unconscious"		4:45
10.	"Contronatura"		9:03
Total length:			65:52

- On the expanded edition, "The Flower Called Nowhere" is extended to 5:15 and "Prisoner of Mars" is extended to 4:22.

Japanese edition bonus track
No.	Title	Length
11.	"Off-On"	5:25
Total length:		71:17

2019 expanded edition bonus disc
No.	Title	Writer(s)	Length
1.	"Diagonals (Bode Drums)"		2:22
2.	"Contranatura Pt. 2" (instrumental)		3:18
3.	"Brakhage" (instrumental)		4:09
4.	"The Flower Called Nowhere" (instrumental)		4:37
5.	"Bonus Beats"	Ramsay	3:28
6.	"Diagonals" (instrumental)		5:43
7.	"Contranatura" (demo)		2:08
8.	"Allures" (demo)		1:06
9.	"Refractions in the Plastic Pulse" (demo)	Gane; Sadier; Ramsay	2:25
10.	"I Feel the Air" (demo)		2:28
11.	"Off-On" (demo)		1:16
12.	"Incredible He Woman" (demo)		1:44
13.	"Miss Modular" (demo)		1:42
14.	"Untitled in Dusseldorf" (demo)		1:30
Total length:			37:56

== Personnel ==
Credits are adapted from the album's liner notes.

Stereolab

- Tim Gane, Lætitia Sadier, Mary Hansen, Richard Harrison, Morgane Lhote, and Andy Ramsay – vocals, Farfisa organ, analogue synthesizers "and other electronic devices (for sound generating and filtering)", Rhodes piano, piano, clavinet, electric guitar, nylon string acoustic guitar, bass, drums, percussion, drum machines ("beatbox" and "electronic percussion")

Additional musicians

- John McEntire – analogue synthesizer, electronics, percussion, vibraphone, marimba (tracks 1, 2, 4, 6–9)
- Sean O'Hagan – piano, Rhodes piano, Farfisa organ (1, 2, 4, 6–9), brass arrangements, string arrangements
- Douglas McCombs – acoustic bass (1)
- Jan St. Werner – electronics, "insect horns" (3, 5, 10)
- Andi Toma – electronics, electronic percussion (3, 5, 10)
- Xavier "Fischfinger" Fischer – piano (3)
- Jeb Bishop, Dave Max Crawford, Paul Mertens, and Ross Reed – brass section
- Andy Robinson – brass arrangements
- Poppy Branders, Maureen Loughnane, Rebecca McFaul, and Shelley Weiss – string section
- Marcus Holdaway – string arrangements

Production

- Stereolab (credited as "The Groop") – production, mixing
- John McEntire – production, recording, mixing (1, 2, 4, 6–9 at Idful Music Corporation, Chicago)
- Nick Webb – mastering (Abbey Road Studios, London)
- Andi Toma – production, recording, mixing (3, 5, 10 at Academy of St. Martin in the Street, Düsseldorf)
- Jan St. Werner – electronics and engineering (3, 5, 10)
- Max Stamm – additional engineering (3, 5, 10)

== Charts ==
Chart (1997)	Peak position
Norwegian Albums (VG-lista)	38
Scottish Albums (Official Charts)	41
UK Albums (Official Charts)	19
UK Independent Albums (OCC)	5
US Billboard 200	111
US Heatseekers Albums (Billboard)	2

Chart (2019)	Peak position
Scottish Albums (Official Charts)	34
