= Oscillons from the Anti-Sun =

Box set by Stereolab
- Released: 25 April 2005
- Genres: Avant-pop; post-rock
- Length: 206:21
- Labels: Duophonic (UK); Too Pure (US)

Stereolab chronology
Margerine Eclipse (2004)	Oscillons from the Anti-Sun (2005)	Fab Four Suture (2006)

Professional ratings
Review scores
Source	Rating
AllMusic	4/5 stars
Rolling Stone	4/5 stars

Oscillons from the Anti-Sun, released in April 2005, is a three-CD, one-DVD box-set collection of Stereolab tracks culled from eight of the group's EPs (Jenny Ondioline, Ping Pong, Wow and Flutter, Fluorescences, Cybele's Reverie, Miss Modular, The Free Design and Captain Easychord) and singles. It includes both released and unreleased tracks, which are not presented in chronological order. The DVD features promo videos and TV appearances.

== Track listing ==
CD 1

1. "Fluorescences" – 3:23 (from the 1996 Fluorescences EP)
2. "Allures" – 3:29 (from the 1997 Miss Modular EP)
3. "Fruition" – 3:50 (from the 1993 Jenny Ondioline EP)
4. "Wow and Flutter" – 3:07 (from the 1994 Wow and Flutter EP)
5. "With Friends Like These" – 5:50 (from the 1999 The Free Design EP)
6. "Pinball" – 3:13 (from the 1996 Fluorescences EP)
7. "Spinal Column" – 2:53 (from the 1997 Miss Modular EP)
8. "Ping Pong" (Unreleased LP Version) – 3:02
9. "Golden Ball" – 6:26 (from the 1993 Jenny Ondioline EP)
10. "Cybele's Reverie" – 2:55 (from the 1996 Cybele's Reverie EP)
11. "Nihilist Assault Group (Parts 3, 4, 5)" – 7:12 (from the 1994 Wow and Flutter EP) (mislabeled as Parts 1, 2, 3)
12. "Off-On" – 5:24 (from the 1997 Miss Modular EP)

CD 2

1. "Jenny Ondioline Pt.1" – 3:53 (from the 1993 Jenny Ondioline EP)
2. "Young Lungs" – 6:33 (from the 1996 Cybele's Reverie EP)
3. "Escape Pod" (From the World of Medical Observations) – 3:57 (from the 1999 The Free Design EP)
4. "Moodles" – 7:23 (from the 2001 Captain Easychord EP)
5. "You Used to Call Me Sadness" – 5:10 (from the 1996 Fluorescences EP)
6. "Captain Easychord" – 2:53 (from the 2001 Captain Easychord EP)
7. "Les Aimies Des Memes" – 3:55 (from the 1999 The Free Design EP)
8. "French Disco" – 4:26 (from the 1993 Jenny Ondioline EP)
9. "Transona Five" (Live) – 5:42 (from the 1994 Ping Pong EP)
10. "Moogie Wonderland" – 3:34 (from the 1994 Ping Pong EP)
11. "Canned Candies" – 4:13 (from the 2001 Captain Easychord EP)
12. "Narco Martenot" – 4:23 (from the 1994 Wow and Flutter EP)

CD 3

1. "The Noise of Carpet (US Single)" – 3:07 (from the 1996 "Noises" single)
2. "The Free Design" – 3:45 (from the 1999 The Free Design EP)
3. "Les Yper-Yper Sound" – 5:18 (from the 1996 Cybele's Reverie EP)
4. "Pain Et Spectacles" – 3:31 (from the 1994 Ping Pong EP)
5. "Ping Pong" – 3:03 (from the 1994 Ping Pong EP)
6. "Long Life Love" – 7:06 (from the 2001 Captain Easychord EP)
7. "Jenny Ondioline" (Alternate Version) – 6:08
8. "Heavy Denim" – 2:49 (from the 1994 Wow and Flutter EP)
9. "Brigitte" – 5:46 (from the 1996 Cybele's Reverie EP)
10. "Miss Modular" – 4:13 (from the 1997 Miss Modular EP)
11. "Soop Groove #1" – 13:06 (from the 1996 Fluorescences EP)

DVD

1. "Jenny Ondioline" – UK promo
2. "Ping Pong" – UK promo
3. "Wow and Flutter" – UK promo
4. "Cybele's Reverie" – UK promo
5. "Fluorescences" – UK promo
6. "Miss Modular" – UK promo
7. "The Free Design" – UK promo
8. "The Noise of Carpet" – US promo
9. "French Disko" – The Word
10. "Cybele's Reverie" – Later with Jools Holland
11. "Les Yper Sound" – Later with Jools Holland
