= Studio Electronics =

Manufacturer of music equipment

Studio Electronics is a manufacturer of analog synthesizers and other music equipment. The company was founded in 1981 and is based in the United States. Formerly, the company rackmounted synthesizers such as the Minimoog, Sequential Circuits Prophet-5 and Oberheim OB-8. In 2017, Studio Electronics collaborated with Roland in the development of the Roland SE-02, a three oscillator analog synthesizer.

== Product history ==
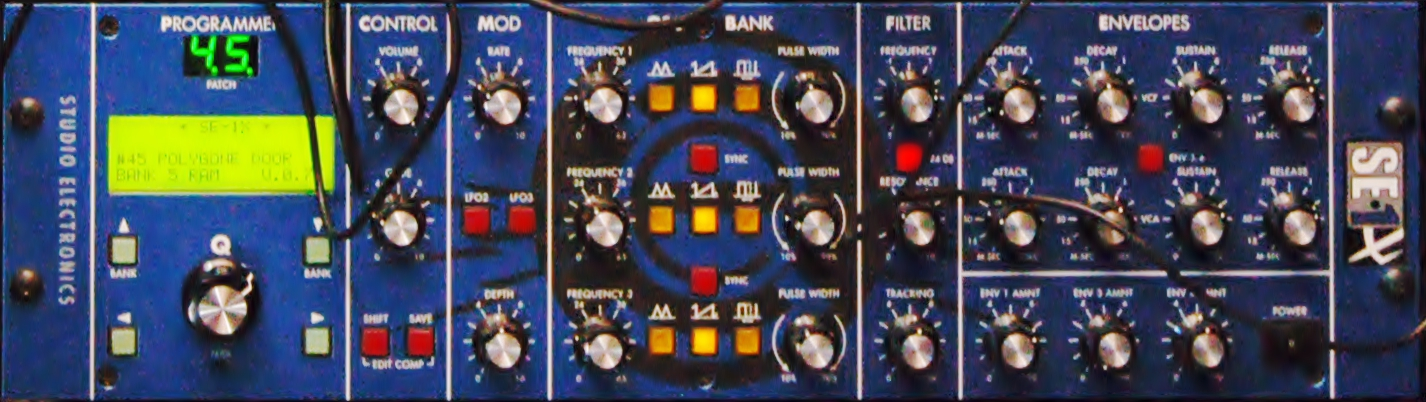
The SE-1X

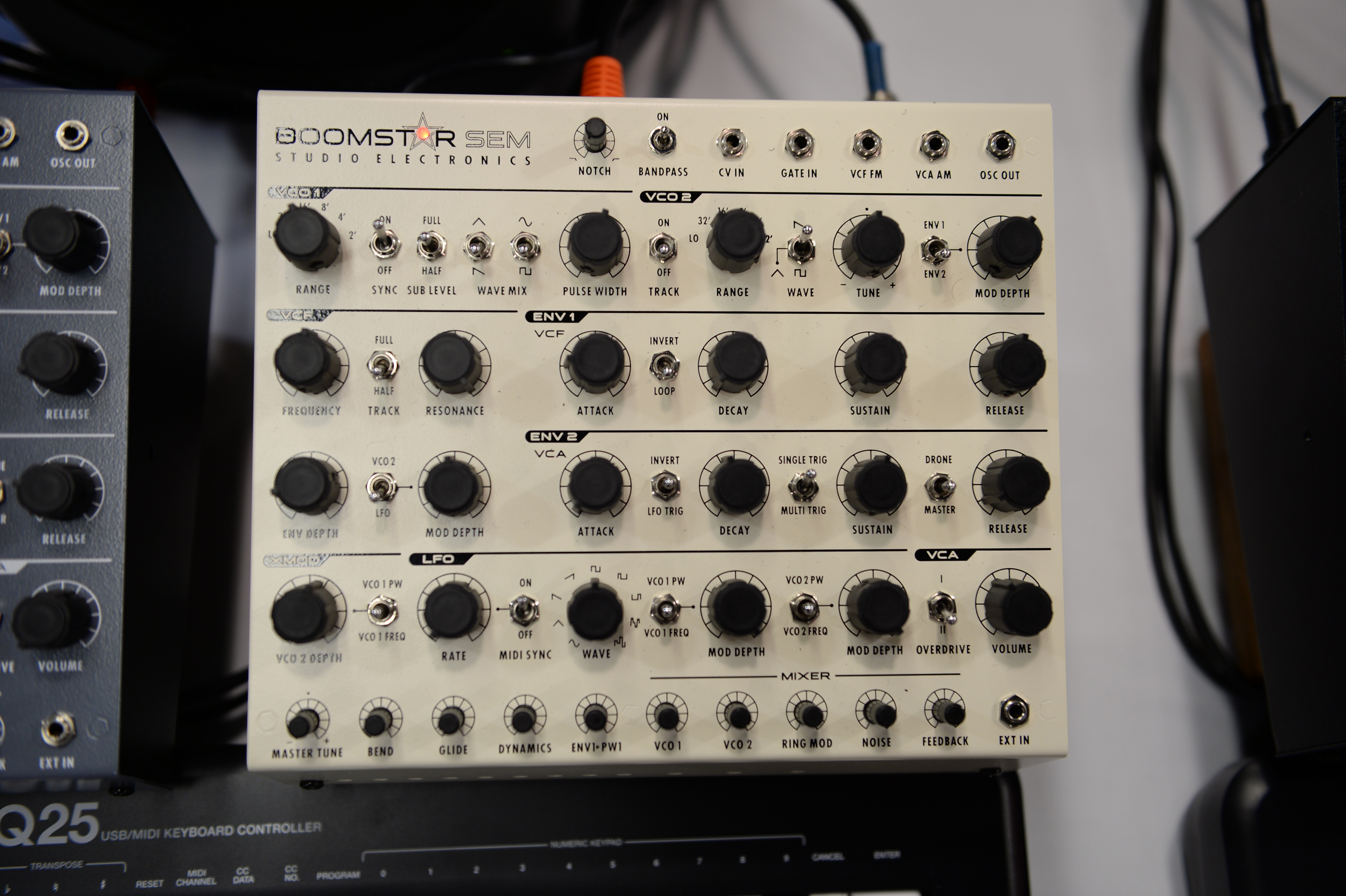
Boomstar SEM

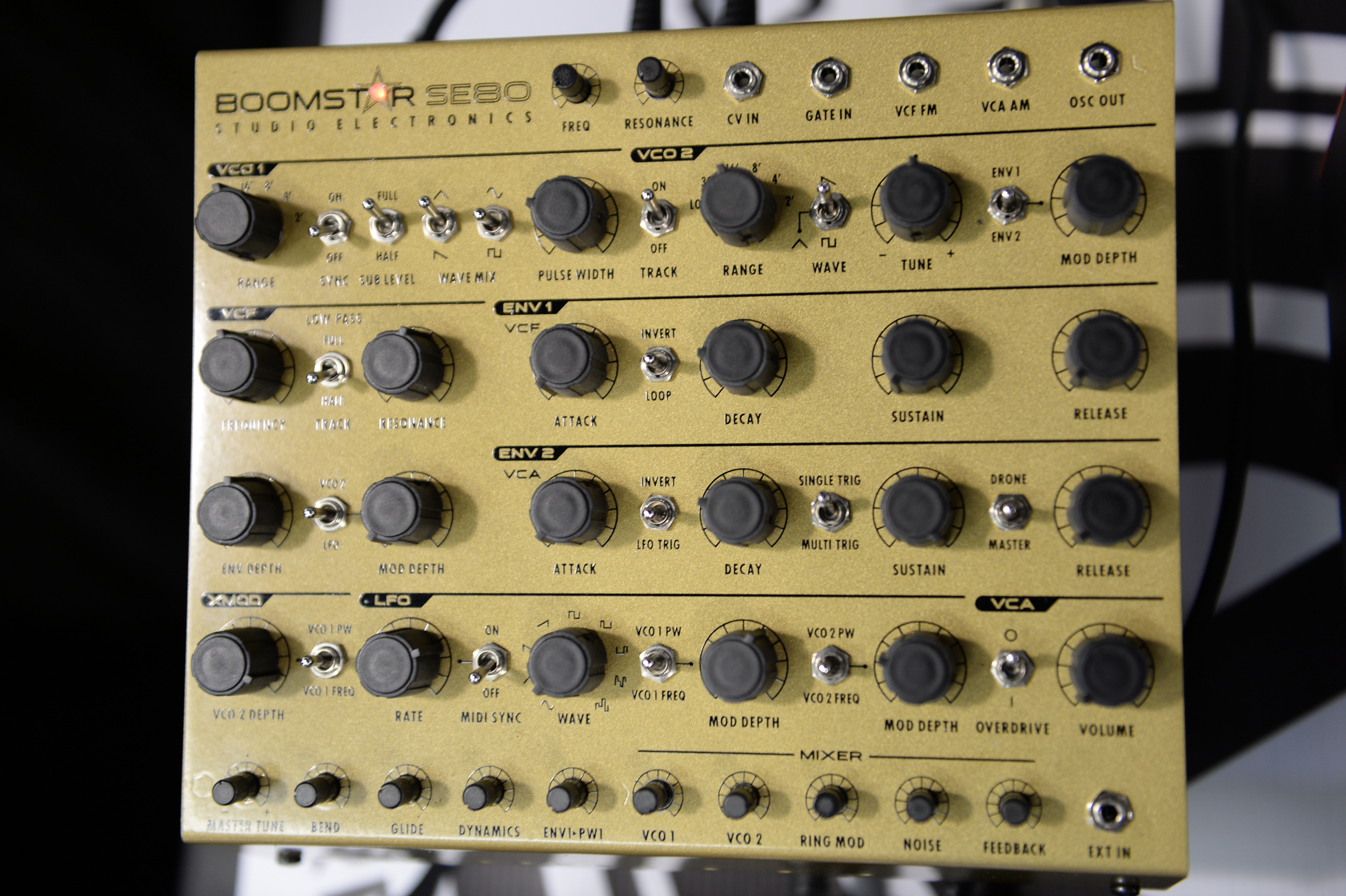
Boomstar SE80

- Midimoog (1989)
- ATC-1 (1996-7)
- SE-1/SE-1X (1993/2000)
- ATC-X (2003)
- Modmax series (2004)
- Omega 8 (2004)
- Boomstar series (2014)
- Quadnic (2016)
- Tonestar 2600 (2016)
