= Not Music =

Studio album by Stereolab
- Released: 16 November 2010
- Recorded: 2007–2009
- Studios: Instant Zero (France); Press Play (London)
- Genre: Post-rock
- Length: 56:17
- Labels: Drag City; Duophonic

Stereolab chronology
Chemical Chords (2008)	Not Music (2010)	Electrically Possessed (2021)

Not Music is the tenth studio album by English-French rock band Stereolab, released on 16 November 2010 by Drag City and Duophonic Records. The album is a collection of unreleased material recorded at the same time as their previous album, Chemical Chords (2008). It was the band's last studio album for fifteen years until 2025's Instant Holograms on Metal Film.

== Background ==
Most of the songs on Not Music were recorded during the same sessions as Stereolab's previous album Chemical Chords. The album also contains remixed versions of "Silver Sands" and "Neon Beanbag", two songs that previously appeared on Chemical Chords.

Not Music was released by Drag City and Stereolab's self-operated label Duophonic Records on 16 November 2010, during the band's indefinite hiatus following the 2008 release of Chemical Chords.

== Critical reception ==
Professional ratings
Aggregate scores
Source	Rating
AnyDecentMusic?	6.5/10
Metacritic	70/100
Review scores
Source	Rating
AllMusic	3.5/5 stars
The A.V. Club	B
The Guardian	3/5 stars
The Irish Times	4/5 stars
NME	7/10
Pitchfork	7.5/10
PopMatters	8/10
Q	3/5 stars
Record Collector	4/5 stars
Uncut	3/5 stars

Not Music received generally positive reviews from critics. On the review aggregate website Metacritic, the album has a score of 70 out of 100, indicating "Generally favorable reviews".

Arnold Pan of PopMatters found that "the catchiest tracks on Not Music make a good soundtrack for strolling down memory lane, with Stereolab offering fresh takes on old triumphs, rather than just reliving them." Rebecca Raber of Pitchfork was also positive, writing, "I suspect it won't be long before we realize that the leftovers of a band like Stereolab are still better than main dishes offered up by many of their peers." AllMusic critic Heather Phares described Not Music as being "all over the place in the best possible way", noting that it would especially appeal to listeners interested in "Stereolab's gracefully intellectual side". The A.V. Club's Christian Williams said that while the record felt padded near the end, "[f]or reheated leftovers... Not Music is delicious."

In a mixed review, Jon Falcone of Drowned in Sound wrote, "Stereolab will always provide excitement, but in the past, part of that excitement came from a band having no idea of how they should sound, so that the result threw polemics and tangents together with an unmatched grace. Now it feels as though they're comfortable in their skin. This is great for them, but for the listener it's a bitter sweet comfort and feels akin to insincerely wishing well to an ex who has happily moved on." Under the Radar writer Hays Davis was more critical, describing Not Music as "one of those albums of extras that disappointingly lays bare why these tracks were excluded from those that initially found a release."

== Track listing ==
All tracks are written by Tim Gane and Lætitia Sadier, except where noted.

No.	Title	Writer(s)	Length
1.	"Everybody's Weird Except Me"		3:34
2.	"Supah Jaianto"		5:07
3.	"So Is Cardboard Clouds"		3:49
4.	"Equivalences"	Gane	2:23
5.	"Leleklato Sugar"		3:04
6.	"Silver Sands" (Emperor Machine mix)		10:20
7.	"Two Finger Symphony"		3:47
8.	"Delugeoisie"		3:41
9.	"Laserblast"		3:25
10.	"Sun Demon"		3:18
11.	"Aelita"		3:49
12.	"Pop Molecules (Molecular Pop 2)"		2:03
13.	"Neon Beanbag" (Atlas Sound mix)		7:57
Total length:			56:17

Japanese edition bonus track
No.	Title	Length
14.	"Neon Beanbag" (Atlas Sound Southern Baptist remix)	4:33
Total length:		60:50

== Personnel ==
Credits are adapted from the album's liner notes.

Stereolab

- Tim Gane – guitar
- Lætitia Sadier – vocals
- Simon Johns – bass
- Andy Ramsay – drums, VCS 3 synthesizer
- Joe Watson – Moog synthesizer, Farfisa organ

Additional musicians

- Sean O'Hagan – brass arrangements on "Supah Jaianto"
- Joe Walters – French horn

Production

- Atlas Sound – remixing on "Neon Beanbag" (Atlas Sound mix)
- The Emperor Machine – remixing on "Silver Sands" (Emperor Machine mix)
- Bo Kondren (credited as "Bo") – mastering
- Stereolab (credited as "The Groop") – mixing
- Joe Watson – engineering, mixing

Design

- Vee – sleeve design

== Charts ==
Chart (2010)	Peak position
UK Independent Albums (Official Charts)	36
US Heatseekers Albums (Billboard)	20
