= Simple Headphone Mind =

EP by Stereolab & Nurse with Wound
- Released: 1997
- Genre: Experimental rock
- Length: 31:40
- Label: Duophonic
- Producer: Steven Stapleton

Stereolab & Nurse with Wound chronology
Crumb Duck (1993)	Simple Headphone Mind (1997)

Stereolab chronology
Miss Modular (1997)	Simple Headphone Mind (1997)	Aluminum Tunes: Switched On, Vol. 3 (1998)

Simple Headphone Mind is the second collaboration between Stereolab and Nurse with Wound. As with their first release, Crumb Duck, Stereolab recorded the basic track and then handed it over to Steven Stapleton to do with as he pleased. Unlike with Crumb Duck, listeners can hear the original Stereolab recording, as it was issued under the title The Long Hair of Death on a split single with Yo La Tengo; this version was also featured on Stereolab's Aluminum Tunes compilation album.

Again, as with Crumb Duck, the release was a limited edition. There were between 800 and 1000 compact discs (the NWW and Stereolab websites disagree on numbers) and 4000 vinyl records, around 1000 of which were on yellow vinyl. All copies came in a sealed metallic sleeve.

"Simple Headphone Mind" was named after the song by krautrock group Alcatraz from the album Vampire State Building. "Trippin' with the Birds" was named in reference to a song by krautrock group Exmagma. Both bands also appear on the Nurse with Wound list.

== Track listing ==
1. "Simple Headphone Mind" – 10:36
2. "Trippin' with the Birds" – 21:04

(Despite having completely different titles, both tracks are based around the same Stereolab recording.)
