= Ping Pong (EP) =

EP by Stereolab
- Released: 11 July 1994
- Recorded: April 1994
- Length: 15:49
- Labels: Duophonic (UK); Elektra (US)

Stereolab chronology
| Jenny Ondioline (1993) | Ping Pong (1994) | Mars Audiac Quintet (1994) |

Professional ratings
Review scores
| Source | Rating |
|---|---|
| AllMusic | link |

Ping Pong is a 1994 EP by the English-French avant-pop band Stereolab. It served as the lead single from their third full-length album Mars Audiac Quintet. Three limited 7" runs were released in green, black, and pink colors. It was also released on CD and 10" vinyl.

All four of its tracks were later re-released on the Oscillons from the Anti-Sun compilation, along with an alternative mix of "Ping Pong" which had been prepared for Mars Audiac Quintet but has not been used.

"Ping Pong" is an upbeat satirical synthesiser and brass-led pop song which discusses the business cycle. The subject matter, considered to be unusual in popular music, has been cited by critics in support of a description of the group as "Marxist pop", a label that the group rejected.

"Ping Pong" reached #45 in the UK singles chart — Stereolab's biggest hit in the country — and was voted #9 in John Peel's Festive Fifty for 1994.

== Track listing ==
1. "Ping Pong" – 3:02
2. "Moogie Wonderland" – 3:35
3. "Pain et Spectacles" – 3:30
4. "Transona Five" [live] – 5:42

== Charts ==
| Chart (1994) | Peak position |
|---|---|
| UK Singles (Official Charts) | 45 |
