= Lounge music =

Type of easy listening music

- Stylistic origins: light music; jazz; easy listening; big band; space age pop; exotica; bossa nova; cha-cha-cha; mambo; Polynesian music; swing
- Cultural origins: 1950s, United States
- Derivative forms: chamber pop; chill-out music; downtempo; muzak; Shibuya-kei

Lounge music is a type of easy listening or light music 'emerging from the era of light music on the radio (the 1920s and 1930s)'. The range of lounge music encompasses beautiful music–influenced instrumentals, and modern electronica (with chillout and downtempo influences), while remaining thematically focused on its retro–space age cultural elements.

== Retrospective usage ==
Exotica, space age pop, and some forms of easy listening music popular during the 1950s and 1960s are now broadly termed "lounge". The term "lounge" does not appear in textual documentation of the period, such as Billboard magazine or long playing album covers, but has been retroactively applied.

While rock and roll was generally influenced by blues and country, lounge music was derived from jazz and other musical elements borrowed from traditions around the world. Exotica from such artists as Les Baxter, Martin Denny, Arthur Lyman, and The Three Suns sold millions of records during its heyday. It combined music that was popular outside the United States, such as various Latin genres (e.g., bossa nova, cha-cha-cha, mambo as in Cal Tjader's fine Latin jazz efforts), Polynesian, French, etc. into a relaxed, palatable sound. Such music could have some instruments exaggerated (e.g., a Polynesian song might have an exotic percussion arrangement using bongos, and vocalists imitating wild animals). Many of these recordings were portrayed as originating in exotic foreign lands, but in truth were recorded in Hollywood recording studios by veteran session musicians. Another genre, space age pop, mimicked space age sound effects of the time and reflected the public interest in space exploration. With the advent of stereophonic technology, artists such as Esquivel used spatial audio techniques to full effect, creating whooshing sounds with his orchestra.

A good deal of lounge music was pure instrumental (i.e., no main vocal part, although there could be minor vocal parts). Sometimes, this music would be theme music from movies or TV shows, although such music could be produced independently from other entertainment productions. These instrumentals could be produced with an orchestral arrangement, or from an arrangement of instruments very similar to that found in jazz, or even rock and roll such as the Hammond organ or electric guitar.

== Lounge singers ==
"Swinging" music of the era is also considered "lounge" and consisted of a continuation of the swing jazz era of the 1930s and 1940s, but with more of an emphasis on the vocalist. Soft and gentle vocalists such as Frank Sinatra, Dean Martin, Dooley Wilson, Pat Boone, Bobby Darin, Jackie Gleason, Wayne Newton, Louis Prima, Sam Butera, Bing Crosby, Perry Como, Sammy Davis Jr., Louis Armstrong and Bobby Vinton are notable examples of lounge music. Female lounge singers include Julie London, Dinah Washington, Nina Simone, Ella Fitzgerald, Keely Smith, Peggy Lee, Sarah Vaughan, Billie Holiday, Etta James, Mrs. Miller, Lesley Gore, Rosemary Clooney and Blossom Dearie. The music of Burt Bacharach was soon featured as part of many lounge singers' repertoires. Such artists performed mainly at featured lounges in Las Vegas casinos. Documented pioneers of the Las Vegas lounge scene, the Mary Kaye Trio were first on the scene in the early 1950s.

Lounge singers have a lengthy history stretching back to the decades of the early twentieth century. In any event, these lounge singers, perhaps performing in a hotel or cocktail bar, are usually accompanied by one or two other musicians, and they favor cover songs composed by others, especially pop standards, many deriving from the days of Tin Pan Alley.

Many well-known performers began their careers as lounge singers and musicians. Billy Joel worked in a piano bar for six months and penned the song "Piano Man" about his experience.

== Resurgence ==
Lounge emerged in the late 1980s as a label of endearment by younger fans whose parents had listened to such music in the 1960s. It has enjoyed resurgences in popularity in the 1980s and 1990s, led initially by figures such as Buster Poindexter and Jaymz Bee. In Japan, producer Yasuharu Konishi became popular for his work with Pizzicato Five, and is often considered "the Godfather of Shibuya-kei," a genre mostly derived from 1960s lounge music.

In the early 1990s the lounge revival was in full swing and included such groups as Combustible Edison, Love Jones, The Coctails, Pink Martini, the High Llamas, Don Tiki, and Nightcaps. The multinational group the Gentle People, signed to the UK label Rephlex Records, attracted an international following and appeared on various lounge and exotica compilations. Alternative band Stereolab demonstrated the influence of lounge with releases like their 1993 EP Space Age Bachelor Pad Music and their 1997 album Dots and Loops, and in 1996 Capitol Records began issuing the Ultra-Lounge series of lounge music albums. The lounge style was starkly in contrast to the grunge music that dominated the period. These groups wore suits and played music inspired by earlier works of Antônio Carlos Jobim, Juan García Esquivel, Louis Prima and many others.

In 2004, the Parisian band Nouvelle Vague released a self-titled album in which they covered songs from the '80s post-punk and new wave genres in the style of bossa nova. Other artists have taken lounge music to new heights by recombining rock with pop, such as Jon Brion, The Bird and the Bee, Triangle Sun, Pink Martini, the Buddha-Lounge series, and the surrounding regulars of Café Largo. The movie The Rise and Fall of Black Velvet Flag (2003) is a documentary about three older punk rockers who created a lounge-punk band.

In 2018, British rock band Arctic Monkeys released their sixth studio album, Tranquility Base Hotel & Casino. The album, which was a shift in style for the band after 2013's AM, has a more lounge pop sound rather than their previous alternative rock sound. The album is a concept album about a hotel on the Moon (Tranquility Base is the site of the 1969 Apollo 11 Moon landing) and also reflects on modern society and technology, and its effect on the human mind, with frontman Alex Turner taking inspiration from both old science-fiction films and Neil Postman's 1985 book, Amusing Ourselves to Death. Their seventh studio album, The Car, also has a laid-back lounge pop sound, continuing their shift in sound to a lounge pop and baroque pop style.

== In film ==
In the 1980 film The Blues Brothers, five members of the defunct Blues Brothers have formed a lounge act, Murph and the Magictones, and are found performing Latin-esque music at a Holiday Inn. When the band takes a break to speak with Jake and his brother Elwood, Murph switches on a Muzak version of "Just the Way You Are," originally performed by Billy Joel, a former lounge musician himself. Later, when Jake and Elwood are in an elevator, Jobim's "The Girl from Ipanema" (an archetypical elevator music tune) is heard.

The 1989 film The Fabulous Baker Boys starred Jeff Bridges, Beau Bridges, and Michelle Pfeiffer as a successful lounge act.

== Comedy ==
Andy Kaufman created a character called Tony Clifton, a lounge singer. A parody of show biz entitlement and excess, Clifton is untalented, lazy (often not bothering to remember the words to the songs), and abusive to his audiences.

Bill Murray also portrayed a particularly bad lounge singer on Saturday Night Live, Nick The Lounge Singer, best known for providing his own lyrics to the John Williams theme from Star Wars and performing an over-the-top version of the Morris Albert hit "Feelings". Later on SNL, Will Ferrell and Ana Gasteyer portrayed a goofy married duo of lounge-style musicians, but in unlikely venues such as high school dances. Part of the humor derived from the incongruous application of their "nerdy" and outdated style to performances of current pop-music hits. British comedians Mel Smith and Griff Rhys Jones appeared as a cheesy keyboard and bass duo during the end credits of one series of their long-running sketch show.

Richard Cheese and the Lounge Kittens perform lounge-style arrangements of recent popular songs for comedic effect.

== See also ==
- Crooner
- Nightclub music
- Sentimental ballad
- Soft rock
