= Fab Four Suture =

Compilation album by Stereolab
- Released: 6 March 2006
- Recorded: 2005
- Labels: Duophonic (UK); Too Pure (US)

Stereolab chronology
Oscillons from the Anti-Sun (2005)	Fab Four Suture (2006)	Serene Velocity: A Stereolab Anthology (2006)

Professional ratings
Review scores
Source	Rating
AllMusic	4/5 stars
The A.V. Club	B+
IGN	8.6/10
musicOMH	4/5 stars
Pitchfork Media	(6.6/10)
PopMatters	7/10
Rolling Stone	2.5/5 stars
The Skinny	3/5 stars
Slant Magazine	3/5 stars
Tiny Mix Tapes	4/5 marks

Fab Four Suture is a compilation album by Stereolab, released in the United Kingdom on 6 March 2006, and in the United States a day later on 7 March. It collects six singles and their B-sides originally released on 7-inch vinyl in 2005 and 2006.

== Singles collected on Fab Four Suture ==
Released 12 September 2005 (UK), as three 7" singles:

- Kybernetická Babička - ("Kyberneticka Babicka, Pt. 1", "Kyberneticka Babicka, Pt. 2")
- Plastic Mile - ("Plastic Mile", "I Was a Sunny Rainphase")
- Interlock - ("Interlock", "Visionary Road Maps")

Released 6 March 2006 (UK), as three 7" singles:

- Whisper Pitch - ("Whisper Pitch", "Widow Weirdo")
- Excursions Into - ("Excursions Into 'oh, a-oh'", "Get a Shot of the Refrigerator")
- Eye Of The Volcano - ("Eye Of The Volcano", "Vodiak")

== Track listing ==
1. "Kyberneticka Babicka Pt 1." – 4:31
2. "Interlock" – 4:10
3. "Eye of the Volcano" – 4:16
4. "Plastic Mile" – 5:11
5. ""Get a Shot of the Refrigerator"" – 4:23
6. "Visionary Road Maps" – 3:35
7. "Vodiak" – 3:19
8. "Whisper Pitch" – 3:55
9. "Excursions Into "oh, a-oh"" – 5:27
10. "I Was a Sunny Rainphase" – 3:27
11. "Widow Weirdo" – 4:31
12. "Kyberneticka Babicka Pt 2." – 4:56

== Other sources ==
- "Discography". Stereolab Official Site. Stereolab. Archived from the original on 6 May 2007.
- "fab four suture". Stereolab Official Site. Stereolab. Archived from the original on 12 March 2007.
