= Space Age Bachelor Pad Music =

Space Age Batchelor Pad Music

EP by Stereolab
- Released: 22 March 1993
- Genres: Indie pop; post-rock; space age pop
- Length: 27:38
- Labels: Too Pure (UK); American (US)
- Producers: Stereolab and Andy Wilkinson

Stereolab chronology
Switched On (1992)	Space Age Batchelor Pad Music (1993)	Transient Random-Noise Bursts with Announcements (1993)

Professional ratings
Review scores
Source	Rating
AllMusic	3/5 stars
Pitchfork	8.7/10

Space Age Batchelor Pad Music (also known as The Groop Played "Space Age Batchelor Pad Music") is an EP (or "mini-LP") by the alternative music band Stereolab, originally released in March 1993. The release became an underground hit, and led to the band securing its first major-label record deal.

The title is spelled Space Age Batchelor Pad Music on the front cover, though not on the back cover or spine; The sleeve and label designs use artwork and text from Vanguard Records' "Stereolab" hi-fi test record after which the group was named, including the "flagbearer on horseback" logo of Vanguard Records itself.

== Track listing ==
All tracks are written by Tim Gane and Lætitia Sadier, except "Space Age Batchelor Pad Music (Mellow)" by Sean O'Hagan.

Side one (Easy Listening)
No.	Title	Length
1.	"Avant Garde M.O.R."	4:09
2.	"Space Age Batchelor Pad Music (Mellow)"	1:44
3.	"The Groop Play Chord X"	2:01
4.	"Space Age Batchelor Pad Music (Foamy)"	2:14
5.	"Ronco Symphony"	3:36

Side Two (New Wave)
No.	Title	Length
6.	"We're Not Adult Orientated"	6:07
7.	"U.H.F. – MFP"	4:53
8.	"We're Not Adult Orientated (Neu Wave Live)"	3:34

- All songs published by Complete Music.

== Personnel ==
Played by

- Duncan Brown – Bass (Tracks 6 and 8)
- Tim Gane – Guitars, Bass (Tracks 3, 5 and 7), Farfisa (Track 7), Moog, Samples, Radio
- Mary Hansen – Second Vocals, Moog (Tracks 6 and 8)
- Sean O'Hagan – Farfisa, Chord Organ Moog, Bass (Track 1), Marimbas, Air Freshener Lid, Drum (Track 5)
- Andy Ramsay – Persuasive Percussion
- Lætitia Sadier – Vocals, Tamboorine

Technical credits

- Andy Wilkinson – Engineering
- Giles – Engineering Assistant
- The Groop and Andy – Producer, Mixing
- Magic Glue – Design
