= Miss Modular =

EP by Stereolab
- Released: 1 September 1997
- Recorded: March 1997 – August 1997
- Genre: Art pop
- Length: 16:04
- Label: Duophonic

Stereolab chronology
Dots and Loops (1997)	Miss Modular (1997)	Simple Headphone Mind (1997)

Professional ratings
Review scores
Source	Rating
AllMusic	4/5 stars

Miss Modular is a 1997 EP by the post-rock band Stereolab. The title track served as the lead single from their album Dots and Loops. It was produced in collaboration with the group Mouse on Mars. Dan the Automator remixed the title track.

All four of its tracks were re-released on the Oscillons from the Anti-Sun compilation.

== Critical reception ==
AllMusic wrote: "Digitally assembled from isolated studio elements, the aptly titled 'Miss Modular' is musique concrète pop, a bubbly yet plainly synthetic effort that walks the tightrope between art and artifice."

== Track listing ==
- United Kingdom (Duophonic) / USA (Elektra)
1. "Miss Modular" – 4:16
2. "Allures" – 3:29
3. "Off-On" – 5:26
4. "Spinal Column" – 2:53
- Japan (EastWest Japan)
1. "Miss Modular" – 4:16
2. "Miss Modular (Automator Mix)" – 4:10
3. "Refractions in the Plastic Pulse (Feebate Mix)" remixed by Autechre – 7:45
4. "Contronatura (Prelude to the Autumn of a Faun Mix)" remixed by Kid Loco – 5:20

In the UK, the "Refractions in the Plastic Pulse" and "Contronatura" remixes were released as a limited edition 12" single.
