= Mars Audiac Quintet =

Studio album by Stereolab
- Released: 2 August 1994
- Recorded: March – April 1994
- Studio: Blackwing (London)
- Genres: Indie pop; space age pop; jangle pop
- Length: 66:57
- Labels: Duophonic; Elektra

Stereolab chronology
Ping Pong (1994)	Mars Audiac Quintet (1994)	Wow and Flutter (1994)

Singles from Mars Audiac Quintet
- 1. "Ping Pong" Released: 18 July 1994; 2. "Wow and Flutter" Released: 17 October 1994

Mars Audiac Quintet is the third studio album by English-French rock band Stereolab. It was released on 2 August 1994 and was issued by Duophonic Records and Elektra Records.

== Recording ==
Stereolab recorded Mars Audiac Quartet in March and April 1994. Keyboardist Katharine Gifford joined the band for the recording of the album. During recording, guitarist Sean O'Hagan left as a full-time member in order to focus on his band the High Llamas, but continued to be a session musician for the band ever since.

== Composition ==
AllMusic critic Heather Phares characterised Mars Audiac Quintet as a more pop-oriented affair than previous Stereolab albums, noting that it largely highlights the band's brand of space age pop.

The song "International Colouring Contest" is a tribute to Lucia Pamela and opens with a sample of her voice.

== Release ==
Mars Audiac Quintet was released on 2 August 1994 in the United States by Elektra Records, and on 8 August 1994 in the United Kingdom by Duophonic Records. It peaked at number 16 on the UK Albums Chart. The tracks "Ping Pong" and "Wow and Flutter" were released as singles on 18 July 1994 and 17 October 1994, respectively.

A remastered and expanded edition of Mars Audiac Quintet was released by Duophonic and Warp on 3 May 2019.

== Critical reception and legacy ==
Professional ratings
Review scores
Source	Rating
AllMusic	4/5 stars
The Encyclopedia of Popular Music	4/5 stars
Entertainment Weekly	C+
Pitchfork	9.1/10
Q	4/5 stars
Record Collector	4/5 stars
The Rolling Stone Album Guide	4/5 stars
Select	4/5
Spin Alternative Record Guide	8/10
Uncut	8/10

Richard Fontenoy, writing in The Rough Guide to Rock, said that Mars Audiac Quintet elevated Stereolab "firmly into the higher stratum of indie pop". In 2003, Pitchfork ranked Mars Audiac Quintet as the 78th best album of the 1990s.

The American indie rock band Transona Five took their name from the title of the third track on the album.

== Track listing ==
All tracks are written by Tim Gane and Lætitia Sadier, except where noted.

No.	Title	Writer(s)	Length
1.	"Three-Dee Melodie"		5:02
2.	"Wow and Flutter"		3:08
3.	"Transona Five"		5:32
4.	"Des étoiles électroniques"		3:20
5.	"Ping Pong"		3:02
6.	"Anamorphose"		7:33
7.	"Three Longers Later"		3:28
8.	"Nihilist Assault Group"		6:55
9.	"International Colouring Contest"		3:47
10.	"The Stars Our Destination"		2:58
11.	"Transporté sans bouger"		4:20
12.	"L'enfer des formes"		3:53
13.	"Outer Accelerator"		5:21
14.	"New Orthophony"		4:34
15.	"Fiery Yellow"	Gane; Sean O'Hagan	4:04
Total length:			66:57

- On the expanded edition, "Transona Five" is extended to 6:21, "Des étoiles électroniques" is extended to 4:01, "Three Longers Later" is extended to 3:43, and "The Stars Our Destination" is extended to 3:57.

Japanese edition bonus track
No.	Title	Length
16.	"Moogie Wonderland"	3:35
Total length:		70:32

Limited edition bonus disc
No.	Title	Length
1.	"Klang Tone"	5:36
2.	"Ulan Bator"	3:14
Total length:		8:50

2019 expanded edition bonus disc
No.	Title	Length
1.	"Ulan Bator"	2:20
2.	"Klang Tone"	5:38
3.	"Melochord Seventy-Five" (original Pulse version)	5:32
4.	"Outer Accelerator" (original mix)	6:05
5.	"Nihilist Assault Group – Part 6"	2:13
6.	"Wow and Flutter" (7"/EP version – alternative mix)	3:06
7.	"Des étoiles électroniques" (demo)	1:25
8.	"Ping Pong" (demo)	2:55
9.	"The Stars Our Destination" (demo)	1:19
10.	"Three Longers Later" (demo)	2:05
11.	"Transona Five" (demo)	1:30
12.	"Transporté sans bouger" (demo)	2:09
Total length:		36:17

Sample credits

- "International Colouring Contest" contains a sample of Into Outer Space with Lucia Pamela, written by Lucia Pamela.

== Personnel ==
Credits are adapted from the album's liner notes.

Stereolab

- Tim Gane – guitar, Farfisa and Vox organs, Moog synthesizer, bass
- Lætitia Sadier – vocals, tambourine, Mint's and Vox organs, guitar
- Duncan Brown – bass
- Katharine Gifford – Farfisa and Vox organs, Moog synthesizer, backing vocals on "Transporté sans bouger"
- Mary Hansen – vocals, guitar, tambourine, egg shaker
- Sean O'Hagan – marimba, slide guitar, brass arrangements, guitar twang on "Ping Pong", guitar tremolo on "International Colouring Contest", percussion on "Fiery Yellow"
- Andy Ramsay – drums, percussion

Additional musicians

- Alan Carter – tenor saxophone, flute
- Vera Daucher – violin
- Jean-Baptiste Garnero – backing vocals on "Transporté sans bouger"
- Lindsay Low – trumpet
- Andy Robinson – trombone

Production

- Steve Rooke – mastering
- Stereolab (credited as "The Groop") – mixing
- Paul Tipler – engineering, mixing
- Nick Webb – mastering

Design

- Peter Morris – photography
- Trouble – layout

== Charts ==
Chart (1994)	Peak position
European Top 100 Albums (Music & Media)	76
Scottish Albums (Official Charts)	33
UK Albums (Official Charts)	16
UK Independent Albums (OCC)	2

Chart (2019)	Peak position
US Top Album Sales (Billboard)	92
