= Jenny Ondioline =

EP by Stereolab
- Released: 27 December 1993
- Length: 18:49
- Labels: Duophonic (UK); Elektra (US)

Stereolab chronology
Crumb Duck (1993)	Jenny Ondioline (1993)	Ping Pong (1994)

Professional ratings
Review scores
Source	Rating
AllMusic	3/5 stars

Jenny Ondioline is a 1993 EP by the Anglo-French band Stereolab, which served as the lead single from the album Transient Random-Noise Bursts with Announcements. It was released on CD and 10" vinyl. Its tracks were later re-released on the Oscillons from the Anti-Sun compilation.

In the UK, some copies were stickered with the message "Includes French Disco", due to that track receiving an unexpected amount of airplay on British radio. "French Disco" was also given co-billing with "Jenny Ondioline" on the UK Singles chart, on which it was Stereolab's first entry, peaking at number 75.

The EP was the first Stereolab release on Elektra Records in the US. At the group's request, and in keeping with their "retro" aesthetic, the artwork for this and most subsequent Stereolab releases used the 1970s Elektra logo (a slightly revised version of which was subsequently reintroduced and remains in use today) instead of the then-current logo.

"Jenny Ondioline" was voted number 39 in John Peel's Festive Fifty for 1993. The re-recorded version of "French Disko" (see below) was voted number 5 in the same poll, and number 36 in the All-Time Festive Fifty broadcast in January 2000.

"French Disko" was later covered by Editors as a bonus track on their single "Munich". Other acts to have covered the song include Theoretical Girl, Cineplexx and The Raveonettes.

== Name origin ==
The Ondioline was a pioneering electronic keyboard invented by Georges Jenny in 1938 and commonly called the Jenny Ondioline. The instrument was a predecessor to the modern electronic synthesizer.

== Track listing ==
=== Original version ===
1. "Jenny Ondioline" – 3:53
2. "Fruition" – 3:50
3. "Golden Ball" – 6:26
4. "French Disco" – 4:26

"Jenny Ondioline" is subtitled "(Part 1)" on the US release.

=== Re-recording ===
In March 1994, new recordings of "Jenny Ondioline" and "French Disko" (with the spelling altered) were issued as a limited-edition 7" and CD in the UK only. Given the limited pressing, the single did not chart. "French Disko" later appeared on the group's rarities collection Refried Ectoplasm. The alternative version of "Jenny Ondioline" appeared along with the original single version on Oscillons from the Anti-Sun.

1. "French Disko" (new version)
2. "Jenny Ondioline" (new version)

== Charts ==
Chart performance for Jenny Ondioline
Chart (1993)	Peak position
UK Singles (Official Charts)	75
