= Peng! =

Studio album by Stereolab
- Released: 26 May 1992
- Recorded: April 1992
- Genre: Experimental pop; indie pop
- Length: 47:47
- Label: Too Pure
- Producer: Robbs; Stereolab

Stereolab chronology
Super-Electric (1991)	Peng! (1992)	Low Fi (1992)

Professional ratings
Review scores
Source	Rating
AllMusic	3.5/5 stars
The Encyclopedia of Popular Music	3/5 stars
Entertainment Weekly	B+
Pitchfork	4.8/10 (1995); 7.5/10 (2019)
Record Collector	4/5 stars
The Rolling Stone Album Guide	2.5/5 stars
Spin Alternative Record Guide	6/10
Uncut	7/10

Peng! is the debut studio album by English-French band Stereolab. It was released on 26 May 1992 by Too Pure in the United Kingdom. The album was issued in the United States on 13 June 1995 by Too Pure and American Recordings. A remastered edition of the album was released on 9 November 2018 by Too Pure and Beggars Arkive.

The album's title (a German onomatopoeia for a loud pop or bang) and cover art are derived from a comic strip named "Der tödliche Finger" that appeared in a 1970 issue of Hotcha, a Swiss underground newspaper. Different panels of the same strip were adapted into cover art for other early Stereolab releases, and remain popular icons for the band.

== Track listing ==
All tracks are written by Tim Gane and Lætitia Sadier, except where noted.

No.	Title	Writer(s)	Length
1.	"Super Falling Star"		3:16
2.	"Orgiastic"		4:44
3.	"Peng! 33"		3:03
4.	"K-Stars"		4:04
5.	"Perversion"		5:01
6.	"You Little Shits"		3:25
7.	"The Seeming and the Meaning"		3:48
8.	"Mellotron"		2:47
9.	"Enivrez-vous"	Charles Baudelaire	3:51
10.	"Stomach Worm"		6:35
11.	"Surrealchemist"		7:13
Total length:			47:47

== Personnel ==
Credits are adapted from the album's liner notes.

Stereolab

- Tim Gane – guitar, Farfisa organ, Moog synthesizer
- Lætitia Sadier – vocals, Moog synthesizer
- Joe Dilworth – drums
- Martin Kean – bass

Production

- Roger Askew – engineering
- Robbs – production, engineering, mixing
- Stereolab – production, mixing

== Charts ==
Chart (1992)	Peak position
UK Independent Albums (OCC)	6
