= Transient Random-Noise Bursts with Announcements =

Studio album by Stereolab
- Released: 10 August 1993
- Recorded: May 1993
- Studio: Blackwing (London)
- Genres: Experimental rock; indie pop; post-rock; krautrock
- Length: 61:52
- Labels: Duophonic; Elektra
- Producer: Phil Wright

Stereolab chronology
Space Age Batchelor Pad Music (1993)	Transient Random-Noise Bursts with Announcements (1993)	Crumb Duck (1993)

Singles from Transient Random-Noise Bursts with Announcements
- 1. "Jenny Ondioline" Released: 22 August 1993

Professional ratings
Review scores
Source	Rating
AllMusic	4.5/5 stars
Chicago Tribune	3.5/4 stars
Mojo	4/5 stars
Pitchfork	8.3/10
Q	4/5 stars
Record Collector	4/5 stars
The Rolling Stone Album Guide	4/5 stars
Select	3/5
Spin Alternative Record Guide	9/10
Uncut	8/10

Transient Random-Noise Bursts with Announcements is the second studio album by English-French band Stereolab, released on 10 August 1993 and was issued by Duophonic Records and Elektra Records. It is their first full studio album to feature long-serving members Mary Hansen (backing vocals, tambourine, guitar) and Andy Ramsay (drums). It is distinguished by its emphasis on distorted guitars, feedback, and dissonant keyboard sounds.

== Composition ==
Shortly before the release of Transient Random-Noise Bursts, Stereolab re-recorded the song "Pack Yr Romantic Mind" to remove a sample from George Harrison's Wonderwall Music that they had been denied clearance to use.

On the LP edition of the album, the end of the last track, "Lock-Groove Lullaby", extends into a locked groove repeating a phrase sampled from Perrey and Kingsley's "The Savers", from their 1967 album Kaleidoscopic Vibrations: Electronic Pop Music from Way Out.

== Release ==
Transient Random-Noise Bursts was released on 10 August 1993 in the United States by Elektra Records and on 6 September 1993 in the United Kingdom by Duophonic Records. The album's sleeve design was adapted from that of a hi-fi test record issued by Hi-Fi Sound magazine in 1969; the record itself is sampled on the song "Jenny Ondioline". The majority of the first 1,500 LP copies of Transient Random-Noise Bursts were destroyed due to bad pressing quality.

On its release, Transient Random-Noise Bursts peaked at number 62 on the UK Albums Chart. In advance of the album, "Jenny Ondioline" was released on 22 August 1993.

A remastered and expanded edition of Transient Random-Noise Bursts was released by Duophonic and Warp on 3 May 2019.

== Track listing ==
All tracks are written by Tim Gane and Lætitia Sadier.

No.	Title	Length
1.	"Tone Burst"	5:33
2.	"Our Trinitone Blast"	3:46
3.	"Pack Yr Romantic Mind"	5:04
4.	"I'm Going Out of My Way"	3:25
5.	"Golden Ball"	6:50
6.	"Pause"	5:19
7.	"Jenny Ondioline"	18:06
8.	"Analogue Rock"	4:10
9.	"Crest"	6:03
10.	"Lock-Groove Lullaby"	3:36
Total length:		61:52

- On the expanded edition, "Pause" is extended to 5:30 and "Analogue Rock" is extended to 4:38.

2019 expanded edition bonus disc
No.	Title	Length
1.	"Fragments"	0:48
2.	"Jenny Ondioline" (7"/EP version – alternative mix)	3:47
3.	"Drum – Backwards Bass – Organ" ("Jenny Ondioline" breakdown full version)	3:33
4.	"Analogue Rock" (original mix)	4:35
5.	"Pause" (original mix)	4:32
6.	"French Disco" (early version mix)	4:30
7.	"Jenny Ondioline Part 2" (breakdown mix)	6:24
8.	"Fruition" (demo)	1:22
9.	"I'm Going Out of My Way" (demo)	1:45
10.	"French Disco" (demo)	2:42
11.	"Lock Groove Lullaby" (demo)	1:37
12.	"Jenny Ondioline" (demo)	3:52
13.	"Pause" (demo)	2:24
Total length:		41:51

Sample credits

- "Pack Yr Romantic Mind" interpolates portions of "Strangers in the Night", written by Bert Kaempfert, (Note: Misspelled "Burt Kaempfort" in the album's liner notes) Charles Singleton, and Eddie Snyder.
- "I'm Going Out of My Way" interpolates portions of "One Note Samba", written by Antônio Jobim, Jon Hendricks, and Newton Mendonça. (Note: Misspelled "Mendoca" in the album's liner notes)
- "Jenny Ondioline" contains samples from "Channel Recognition Phasing & Balance", used courtesy of Haymarket Publishing.
- "Lock-Groove Lullaby" interpolates portions of "The Savers", written by Jean Marcel Leroy and Gershon Kingsley.

== Personnel ==
Credits are adapted from the album's liner notes.

Stereolab

- Tim Gane – guitar, Vox organ, Moog synthesizer, bongo drum, tambourine
- Lætitia Sadier – vocals, Vox organ, guitar, tambourine, Moog synthesizer
- Duncan Brown – bass, guitar twang, vocals
- Mary Hansen – vocals, tambourine, guitar
- Sean O'Hagan – Farfisa and Vox organs, guitar
- Andy Ramsay – percussion, Vox organ, bouzouki

Production

- Stereolab (credited as "The Groop") – mixing
- Phil Wright – production, engineering, mixing

== Charts ==
Chart (1993–2019)	Peak position
Scottish Albums (Official Charts)	43
UK Albums (Official Charts)	62
UK Independent Albums (OCC)	7
US Top Album Sales (Billboard)	96
