= Stereolab =

English-French avant-pop band

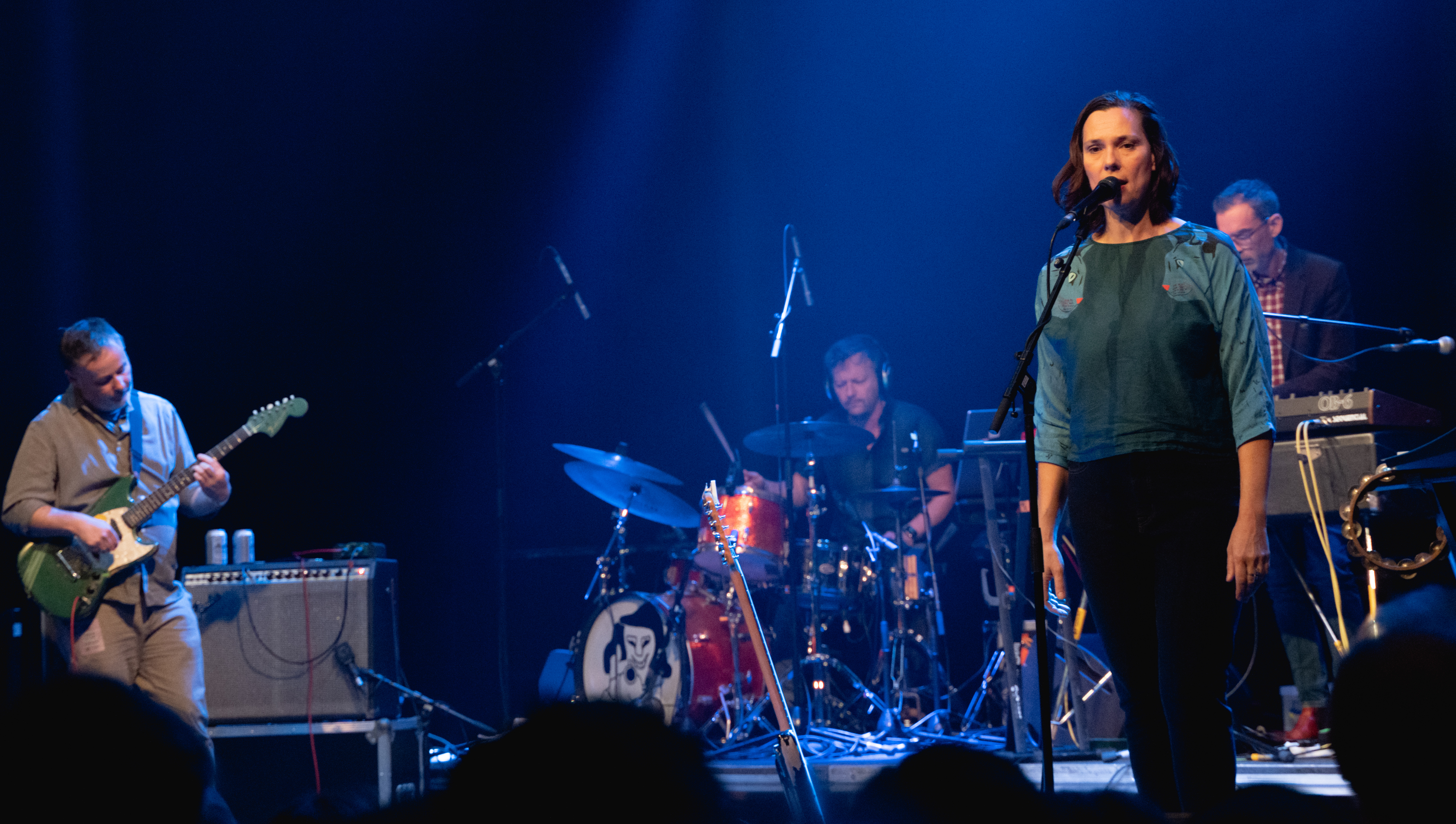
- Stereolab performing at the London Pitchfork Festival in 2021

Background information
- Origin: London, England
- Genres: Avant-pop; indie pop; indietronica; post-rock
- Years active: 1990–2009, 2019–present
- Labels: Duophonic; Elektra; Too Pure; American; 4AD; Slumberland; Drag City; Warp
- Spinoff of: McCarthy
- Members: Tim Gane; Lætitia Sadier; Andy Ramsay; Joseph Watson; Xavier Muñoz Guimera
- Past members: Joe Dilworth; Martin Kean; Gina Morris; Mary Hansen; Sean O'Hagan; Duncan Brown; Katharine Gifford; Richard Harrison; Morgane Lhote; Simon Johns; Dominic Jeffery; David Pajo; Joseph Walters; Julien Gasc
- Website: stereolab.co.uk

Stereolab are a British-French band formed in London in 1990. Led by the songwriting team of Tim Gane and Lætitia Sadier, the group's sound incorporates vintage electronic keyboards and repetitive motorik beats with female vocals sung in English and French, drawing influence from styles such as krautrock, lounge music, jazz, and 1960s French pop. Their lyrics have left-wing political and philosophical themes influenced by the Surrealist and Situationist movements.

Stereolab were formed by Gane (guitar and keyboards) and Sadier (vocals, keyboards and guitar) after the break-up of McCarthy. The two were romantically involved for fourteen years and are the group's only consistent members. Other longtime members included 1992 addition Mary Hansen (backing vocals, keyboards and guitar), who died in 2002, and 1993 addition Andy Ramsay (drums). The High Llamas' leader Sean O'Hagan (guitar and keyboards) was a member from 1993 to 1994 and continued appearing on later records for occasional guest appearances.

Throughout their career, Stereolab have achieved moderate commercial success. The band were released from their recording contract with Elektra Records, and their self-owned label Duophonic signed a distribution deal with Too Pure and later Warp Records. After a ten-year hiatus, the band reunited for live performances in 2019, and eventually released the studio album Instant Holograms on Metal Film in 2025.

== History ==
=== 1990–1993: Formation ===
The band's "Cliff" logo appeared in early releases. It was taken from the 1970 comic strip "Der Tödliche Finger" by Antonholz Portmann.

In 1985, Tim Gane co-founded McCarthy, an indie pop band known for their left-wing politics, in Barking, London. Gane met Lætitia Sadier, born in France, at a 1988 McCarthy concert in Paris, and the two quickly fell in love. Sadier was disillusioned with the rock scene in France, and soon moved to London to be with Gane and to pursue a music career; she appeared on McCarthy's final album Banking, Violence and the Inner Life Today in 1990. Following McCarthy's split later that year, Gane and Sadier formed Stereolab with ex-Chills bassist Martin Kean, drummer Joe Dilworth of Th' Faith Healers and Gina Morris on backing vocals. Stereolab's name was taken from a division of Vanguard Records demonstrating hi-fi effects.

Gane and Sadier, along with future band manager Martin Pike, set up a record label called Duophonic Super 45s which, along with later offshoot Duophonic Ultra High Frequency Disks, would become commonly known as "Duophonic Records". Gane said that their "original plan" was to distribute multiple 7 and 10-inch records "–to just do one a month and keep doing them in small editions". The 10-inch vinyl EP Super 45, released in May 1991, was the first release for both Stereolab and the label, and was sold through mail order and Rough Trade in London. Super 45's band-designed album art and packaging was the first of many customised and limited-edition Duophonic records. In a 1996 interview in The Wire, Gane calls the "do-it-yourself" aesthetic behind Duophonic "empowering", and said that by releasing one's own music "you learn; it creates more music, more ideas".

Stereolab released the EP Super-Electric in September 1991, and a single, titled "Stunning Debut Album" (which was neither debut nor album), followed in November 1991. The early material was rock and guitar-oriented; of Super-Electric Jason Ankeny would later write for the AllMusic website that "Droning guitars, skeletal rhythms, and pop hooks—not vintage synths and pointillist melodies—were their calling cards ..." Under the independent label Too Pure, the group's first full-length album, Peng!, was released in May 1992. A compilation titled Switched On was released in October 1992 and would be part of a series of compilations that anthologise the band's non-album material.

Around this time, the line-up consisted of Gane and Sadier plus vocalist and guitarist Mary Hansen, drummer Andy Ramsay, bassist Duncan Brown, and keyboardist Katharine Gifford. Hansen, born in Australia, had been in touch with Gane since his McCarthy days. After joining, she and Sadier developed a style of vocal counterpoint that distinguished Stereolab's sound. Sean O'Hagan of the High Llamas joined as a quick replacement for their touring keyboardist, but was invited for their next record and "was allowed to make suggestions".

=== 1993–2001: Sign to Elektra ===
Stereolab introduced easy listening elements into their sound with the EP Space Age Bachelor Pad Music, released in March 1993. The work raised the band's profile and landed them an American record deal with Elektra Records. Their first album under Elektra, Transient Random-Noise Bursts with Announcements, was an underground success in both the US and the UK after its release in August of 1993. Mark Jenkins commented in The Washington Post that with the album, Stereolab "continues the glorious drones of [their] indie work, giving celestial sweep to [their] garage-rock organ pumping and rhythm-guitar strumming". In the UK, the album was released on Duophonic.

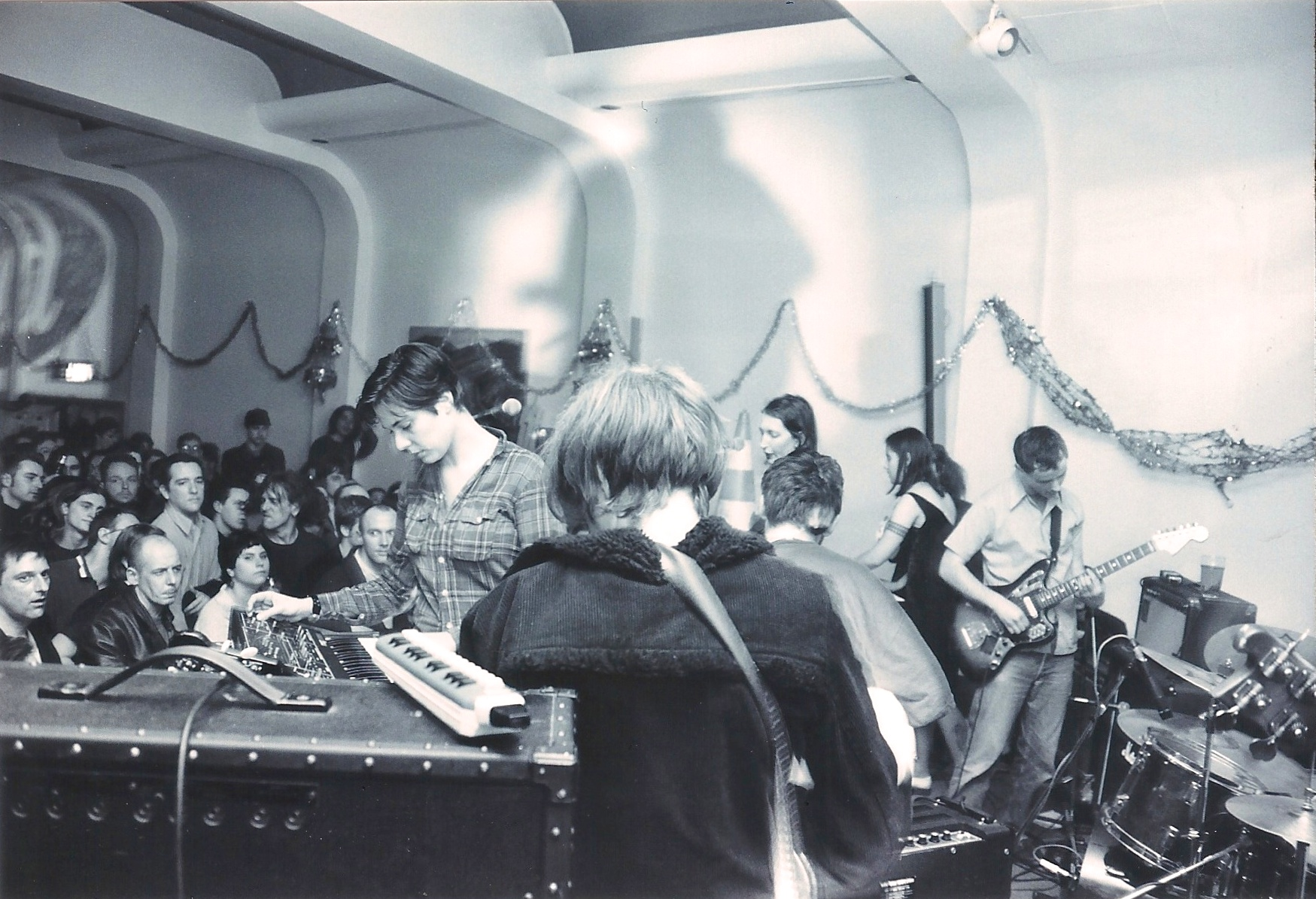
Stereolab performing in London in 1994

In January 1994, Stereolab achieved their first chart entry when the 1993 EP Jenny Ondioline, entered at number 75 on the UK Singles Chart. (Over the next three years, four more releases by the band would appear on this chart, ending with the EP Miss Modular in 1997.) Their third album, Mars Audiac Quintet, was released in August 1994. The album contains the single "Ping Pong", which gained press coverage for its explicitly Marxist lyrics. The band focused more on pop and less on rock, resulting in what AllMusic described as "what may be the group's most accessible, tightly-written album". It was the last album to feature O'Hagan as a full-time member. He would continue to make guest appearances on later releases. The group issued an EP titled Music for the Amorphous Body Study Center in April 1995. The EP was their musical contribution to an interactive art exhibit put on in collaboration with New York City artist Charles Long. Their second compilation of rarities, titled Refried Ectoplasm (Switched On, Vol. 2), was released in July 1995.

The band's fourth album, Emperor Tomato Ketchup (March 1996), was a critical success and was played heavily on college radio. A record that "captivated alternative rock", it represented the group's "high-water mark" said music journalists Tom Moon and Joshua Klein, respectively. The album incorporated their early krautrock sound with funk, hip-hop influences and experimental instrumental arrangements. John McEntire of Tortoise also assisted with production and played on the album. Katharine Gifford was replaced by Morgane Lhote before recording, and bassist Duncan Brown by Richard Harrison after. Lhote was required to both learn the keyboards and thirty of the group's songs before joining.

Released in September 1997, Dots and Loops was their first album to enter the Billboard 200 charts, peaking at number 111. The album leaned towards jazz with bossa nova and '60s pop influences. Barney Hoskyns wrote in Rolling Stone that with it the group moved "ever further away from the one-chord Velvets drone-mesh of its early days" toward easy-listening and Europop. A review in German newspaper Die Zeit stated that in Dots and Loops, Stereolab transformed the harder Velvet Underground-like riffs of previous releases into "softer sounds and noisy playfulness". Contributors to the album included McEntire and Jan St. Werner of Mouse on Mars. Stereolab toured for seven months and took a break when Gane and Sadier had a child. The group's third compilation of rarities, Aluminum Tunes, was issued in October 1998.

Their sixth album, Cobra and Phases Group Play Voltage in the Milky Night, was released in September 1999. It was co-produced by McEntire and Jim O'Rourke, and was recorded with their new bassist, Simon Johns. The album received middling reviews from critics and peaked at number 154 on the Billboard 200. An unsigned NME review said that "this record has far more in common with bad jazz and progressive rock than any experimental art-rock tradition." In a 1999 article of Washington Post, Mark Jenkins asked Gane about the album's apparent lack of guitars; Gane responded, "There's a lot less upfront, distorted guitar ... But it's still quite guitar-based music. Every single track has a guitar on it." Pitchfork also left a negative review.

Stereolab's seventh album, Sound-Dust (August 2001), rose to number 178 on the Billboard 200. The album also featured producers McEntire and O'Rourke. Sound-Dust was more warmly received than Cobra and Phases Group. Critic Joshua Klein said that "the emphasis this time sounds less on unfocused experimentation and more on melody ... a breezy and welcome return to form for the British band." Stephen Thomas Erlewine of AllMusic stated that the album "[finds the group] deliberately recharging their creative juices" but he argued that Sound-Dust was "anchored in overly familiar territory."

=== 2002–2010: Death of Hansen, later releases and hiatus ===
In 2002, as they were planning their next album, Stereolab started building a studio north of Bordeaux, France. ABC Music: The Radio 1 Sessions; a compilation of BBC Radio 1 sessions was released in October. In the same year, Gane and Sadier's romantic relationship ended.

Losing Mary is still incredibly painful ... But it's also an opportunity to transform and move on. It's a new version. We've always had new versions, people coming in and out. That's life.

— Sadier, 2004

On 9 December 2002, Hansen was fatally hit by a truck while riding her bicycle in London. Writer Pierre Perrone said that her "playful nature and mischievous sense of humour came through in the way she approached the backing vocals she contributed to Stereolab and the distinctive harmonies she created with Sadier." For the next few months Stereolab lay dormant as the members grieved, but they eventually decided to continue. Future album and concert reviews would mention the effects of Hansen's absence.

The EP Instant 0 in the Universe (October 2003) was recorded in France, and was Stereolab's first release following Hansen's death. Music journalist Jim DeRogatis said that the EP marked a return to their earlier, harder sound, "free from the pseudo-funk moves and avant-garde tinkering" of its predecessors.

Stereolab's eighth album, Margerine Eclipse, was released on 27 January 2004 with generally positive reviews, and peaked at number 174 on the US Billboard 200. The track "Feel and Triple" was written in tribute to Hansen; Sadier said, "I was reflecting on my years with her ... reflecting on how we sometimes found it hard to express the love we had for one another." Sadier continued, "Our dedication to her on the album says, 'We will love you till the end', meaning of our lives. I'm not religious, but I feel Mary's energy is still around somewhere. It didn't just disappear." The Observer's Molloy Woodcraft gave the album four out of five stars, and commented that Sadier's vocal performance as "life- and love-affirming", and the record as a whole as "Complex and catchy, bold and beatific." Kelefa Sanneh commented in Rolling Stone that Margerine Eclipse was "full of familiar noises and aimless melodies". Margerine Eclipse was Stereolab's last record to be released on Elektra, which shut down that same year. Future material would be released on Too Pure, the same label which had released some of the band's earliest material.

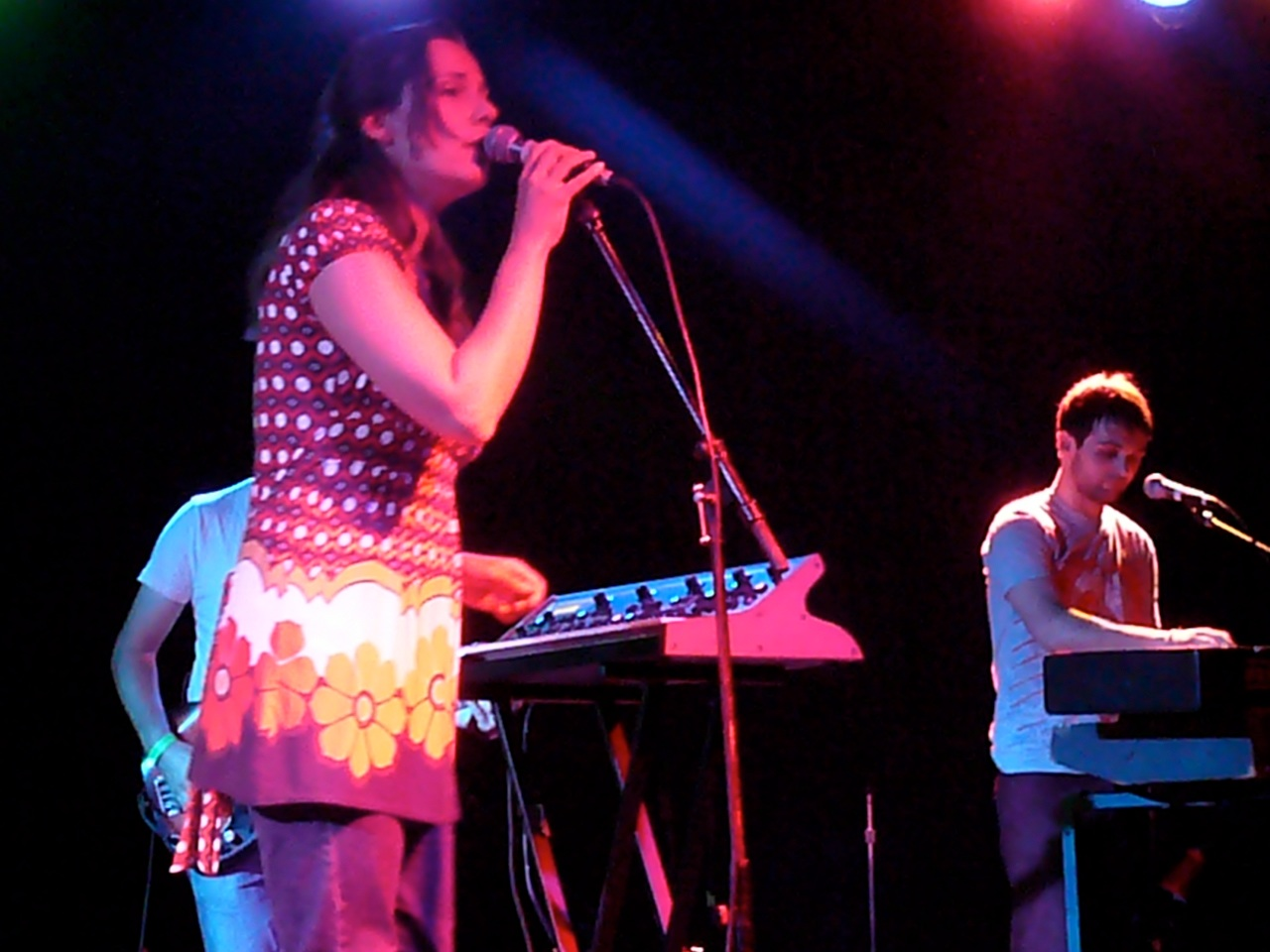
Stereolab performing in Pomona, California in 2008

The group released six limited-edition singles in 2005 and 2006, which were anthologised in the 2006 compilation Fab Four Suture, and contained material which Mark Jenkins thought continued the brisker sound of the band's post-Hansen work. By June 2007, Stereolab's line-up comprised Tim Gane, Lætitia Sadier, Andy Ramsay, Simon Johns, Dominic Jeffrey, Joseph Watson, and Joseph Walters. In 2008, the band issued their next album under the label 4AD titled, Chemical Chords, which "[downplays] their arsenal of analog synths in favor of live instrumentation".

In April 2009, Stereolab manager Martin Pike announced a pause in their activities for the time being. He said that it was an opportune time for the members to move on to other projects. Not Music, a collection of unreleased material recorded at the same time as Chemical Chords, was released in 2010.

=== 2019–present: Reunion and Instant Holograms on Metal Film ===
In February 2019, the group announced a tour of Europe and the United States to coincide with expanded, remastered reissues of several of the albums released under Warp Records. Stereolab were part of the lineup for 2019's Primavera Sound festival, taking part on the weekend of 30 May in Barcelona and the following weekend in Porto. It was the group's first live performance since 2009.

On 8 April 2025, the band announced their first album of brand-new material in 15 years, Instant Holograms on Metal Film. It was accompanied by the release of "Aerial Troubles" as a single and music video on the same day. To the disappointment of many fans, the video was almost completely AI generated, which many saw as not matching the band's expressed beliefs in their music

The band are set to headline We Out Here Festival in Dorset, UK in August 2026.

== Musical style ==
"Jenny Ondioline"
Sample of "Jenny Ondioline", from Transient Random-Noise Bursts with Announcements (1993). This song is considered an example of their musical style and "the most ambitious—and definitive—moment of Stereolab's early years".

"Motoroller Scalatron"
Sample of "Motoroller Scalatron", from Emperor Tomato Ketchup (1996). This clip illustrates the vocal interplay between Lætitia Sadier and Mary Hansen.

Stereolab's music has been called avant-pop, indie pop, art pop, indie electronic, indie rock, post-rock, experimental rock, and experimental pop. The band combines a droning rock sound with lounge instrumentals, overlaid with sing-song female vocals and pop melodies, and have also made use of unorthodox time signatures. Sadier remarked in 2015 that "[the band's] records were written and recorded very quickly... we would write 35 tracks, sometimes more".

Jim Sullivan of The Boston Globe said they were "often pegged as Velvet Underground-influenced retro-futurists. [The group] utilize old Moog synthesi[s]ers and Farfisa and Vox Continental organs, [and] two guitars, bass, and drums." Gane described their use of vintage synthesisers: "We use the older effects because they're more direct, more extreme, and they're more like plasticine: you can shape them into loads of things." The 1994 album Mars Audiac Quintet prominently features Moog synthesisers.

Lætitia Sadier's English, French and occasionally wordless vocals have been a part of Stereolab's music since the beginning, In reference to her laid-back delivery, Peter Shapiro wrote facetiously in Wire that Sadier "display[ed] all the emotional histrionics of Nico", while some critics have commented that her vocals were unintelligible. Sadier would often trade vocals with Mary Hansen back-and-forth in a manner that has been described as "eerie" and "hypnotic", as well as "sweet [and] slightly alien". After Hansen's death in 2002, critic Jim Harrington commented that her absence was noticeable on live performances of Stereolab's older tracks, and that their newer songs could have benefited from Hansen's backing vocals.

In interviews, Gane and Sadier have discussed their musical philosophy. Gane said that "to be unique was more important than to be good." On the subject of being too obscure, he said in a 1996 interview that "maybe the area where we're on dodgy ground, is this idea that you need great knowledge [of] esoteric music to understand what we're doing." Sadier responded to Gane, saying that she "think[s] we have achieved a music that will make sense to a lot of people whether they know about Steve Reich or not." The duo were up-front about their desire to grow their sound: for Gane, "otherwise it just sounds like what other people are doing", and for Sadier, "you trust that there is more and that it can be done more interesting."

=== Influences ===
Their records have been heavily influenced by the "motorik" technique of 1970s krautrock groups such as Neu! and Faust. Tim Gane has supported the comparison: "Neu! did minimalism and drones, but in a very pop way." Dave Heaton of PopMatters said that their music also had "echoes of bubblegum, of exotica, of Beach Boys and bossa nova", with their earlier work "bearing strong Velvet Underground overtones". Funk, jazz, and Brazilian music were additional inspirations for the band. Stephan Davet of French newspaper Le Monde said that Emperor Tomato Ketchup (1996) had musical influences such as Burt Bacharach, and Françoise Hardy. The sounds influenced by minimalist composers Philip Glass and Steve Reich can be found on the 1999 album Cobra and Phases Group Play Voltage in the Milky Night. Stereolab's style also incorporates easy-listening music of the 1950s and '60s. Joshua Klein in The Washington Post said that, "Years before everyone else caught on, Stereolab [were] referencing the 1970s German bands Can and Neu!, the Mexican lounge music master Esquivel and the decidedly unhip Burt Bacharach." Regarding their later work such as Instant 0 in the Universe (2003) and Margerine Eclipse (2004), critics have compared the releases to the band's earlier guitar-driven style.

=== Live performances ===
Stereolab toured regularly to support their album releases. In a 1996 Washington Post gig review, Mark Jenkins wrote that Stereolab started out favouring an "easy-listening syncopation", but eventually reverted to a "messier, more urgent sound" characteristic of their earlier performances. In another review Jenkins said that the band's live songs "frequently veer[ed] into more cacophonous, guitar-dominated territory", in contrast to their albums such as Cobra and Phases Group... In the Minneapolis Star Tribune, Jon Bream compared the band's live sound to feedback-driven rock bands like the Velvet Underground, Sonic Youth and My Bloody Valentine. Jim Harrington of The Oakland Tribune argued that Sadier's vocals sounded subdued, further stating in regard to her switching between singing in English and French that "a Stereolab show is one of the few concerts where it's hard to find even the biggest fans mouthing along with the lyrics." Regarding being onstage, Gane has said that "I don't like to be the center of attention ... I just get into the music and am not really aware of the people there. That's my way of getting through it." Remarking of the band's 2019 reunion tour, he added that "[Stereolab] never were really a festival band... We're not like, 'Hey, how you all doing?' and all that stuff."

== Lyrics and titles ==
What enters my work, we call it human complexities, and politics is a part of that. In the sense that I feel that humanity can do much better... [and] we could organize ourselves in a much more fair and efficient way. In Hollywood and in the media, they seem to flatten things up— it's simple and one-leveled and easy to digest. This is not how we feel life really is. I'm always trying to explore and make sense of contradictions.

— Sadier in an interview with The Boston Globe (1997)

Stereolab's music is politically and philosophically charged. Dave Heaton of PopMatters said that the group "[uses] lyrics to convey ideas while using them for the pleasurable way the words sound." Lætitia Sadier, who writes the group's lyrics, was influenced by both the Situationist philosophical treatise The Society of the Spectacle by Marxist theorist Guy Debord, and later her anger towards the Iraq War. The Surrealist and Situationist cultural and political movements were also influences, as stated by Sadier and Gane in a 1999 Salon interview.

Critics have seen Marxist allusions in the band's lyrics, and have called the band themselves Marxist. Music journalist Simon Reynolds commented that Sadier's lyrics tend to lean towards Marxist social commentary rather than "affairs of the heart". The 1994 single "Ping Pong" has been put forward as evidence in regard to these alleged views. In the song, Sadier sings "about capitalism's cruel cycles of slump and recovery" with lyrics that constitute "a plainspoken explanation of one of the central tenets of Marxian economic analysis" (said critics Reynolds and Stewart Mason, respectively).

Band members have resisted attempts to link the group and its music to Marxism. In a 1999 interview, Gane stated that "none of us are Marxists ... I've never even read Marx." Gane said that although Sadier's lyrics touch on political topics, they do not cross the line into "sloganeering". Sadier also said that she had read very little Marx. Cornelius Castoriadis, a radical political philosopher but strong critic of Marxism, has been cited as a marking influence in Sadier's thinking. The name of her side project, Monade, and its debut album title, Socialisme ou Barbarie, are also references to the work of Castoriadis.

Stereolab's album and song titles occasionally reference avant-garde groups and artists. Gane said that the title of their 1999 album Cobra and Phases Group... contains the names of two Surrealist organisations, "CoBrA" and "Phases Group", The title of the song "Brakhage" from Dots and Loops (1997), is a nod to experimental filmmaker Stan Brakhage. Other examples are the 1992 compilation Switched On, named after Wendy Carlos' 1968 album Switched-On Bach, and the 1993 song "Jenny Ondioline", a portmanteau of inventor Georges Jenny and his instrument the Ondioline.

== Legacy ==
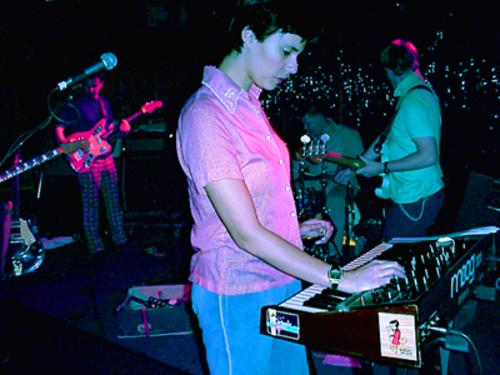
Stereolab were credited for reviving the use of vintage analogue instruments.

Stereolab have been called one of the most "influential" and "fiercely independent and original groups of the Nineties" by writers Stephen Thomas Erlewine and Pierre Perrone respectively. Mark Jenkins called them one of "the decade's most innovative British bands." Simon Reynolds commented in Rolling Stone that the group's earlier records form "an endlessly seductive body of work that sounds always the same, always different." In a review for the 1992 single "John Cage Bubblegum", Jason Ankeny said that "No other artist of its generation fused the high-minded daring of the avant-garde and the lowbrow infectiousness of pop with as much invention, skill, and appeal." In The Wire, Peter Shapiro compared the band to Britpop bands Oasis and Blur, and defended their music against the charge that it is "nothing but the sum total of its arcane reference points."

Stereolab were one of the first groups to be described as post-rock—in a 1996 article, journalist Angela Lewis applied the "new term" to Stereolab and three other bands who have connections to the group. Stylistically, music journalist J. D. Considine credits the band for anticipating and driving the late 1990s revival of vintage analogue instruments among indie rock bands. Stephen Christian, a creative director of Warp Records, said that the group "exists in the gap between the experimentation of the underground and the appeal of the wider world of pop music".

The group have also received negative press. Barney Hoskyns questioned the longevity of their music in a 1996 Mojo review, saying that their records "sound more like arid experiments than music born of emotional need." In The Guardian, Dave Simpson stated: "With their borrowings from early, obscure Kraftwerk and hip obtuse sources, [Stereolab] sound like a band of rock critics rather than musicians." Author Stuart Shea said Lætitia Sadier's vocals were often "indecipherable".

A variety of artists, musical and otherwise, have collaborated with Stereolab. In 1995 the group teamed up with sculptor Charles Long for an interactive art show in New York City, for which Long provided the exhibits and Stereolab the music. They have released tracks by and toured with post-rock band Tortoise, while John McEntire of Tortoise has in turn worked on several Stereolab albums. In the 1990s, the group collaborated with the industrial band Nurse With Wound and released two albums together, Crumb Duck (1993) and Simple Headphone Mind (1998), and Stereolab also released "Calimero" (1998) with French avant-garde singer and poet Brigitte Fontaine. The band worked with Herbie Mann on the song "One Note Samba/Surfboard" for the 1998 AIDS-Benefit album, Red Hot + Rio, produced by the Red Hot Organization.

Stereolab alumni have also founded bands of their own. Guitarist Tim Gane founded the side project Cavern of Anti-Matter and also formed Turn on alongside band member Sean O'Hagan, who formed his own band the High Llamas. Katharine Gifford formed Snowpony with former My Bloody Valentine bassist Debbie Googe. Sadier has released three albums with her four-piece side-project Monade, whose sound Mark Jenkins called a "little more Parisian" than Stereolab's. Backing vocalist Mary Hansen formed a band named Schema with members of Hovercraft and released their eponymous EP in 2000. Former keyboardist, Morgan Lhote, formed a band named Hologram Teen.

As of August 1999, US album sales stood at 300,000 copies sold. Despite receiving critical acclaim and a sizeable fanbase, commercial success eluded the group. Early in their career, their 1993 EP Jenny Ondioline entered the UK Singles Chart, but financial issues prevented the band from printing enough records to satisfy demand. According to Sadier, however, the band "[avoided] going overground" like PJ Harvey, Pulp and the Cranberries, all of whom quickly rose from obscurity to fame, adding: "This kind of notoriety is not a particularly good thing, [and] you don't enjoy it anymore." When Elektra Records was closed down by Warner Bros. Records in 2004, Stereolab was dropped along with many other artists, reportedly because of poor sales. Tim Gane said in retrospect that the group "signed to Elektra because we thought we would be on there for an album or two and then we'd get ejected. We were surprised when we got to our first album!" Since then, Stereolab's self-owned label Duophonic has signed a worldwide distribution deal with independent label Too Pure. Through Duophonic, the band both licenses their music and releases it directly (depending on geographic market). Gane said, "... we license our recordings and just give them to people, then we don't have to ask for permission if we want to use it. We just want to be in control of our own music."

== Members ==
Current members

- Tim Gane - guitar, keyboards (1990–2009, 2019–present)
- Lætitia Sadier - lead vocals, keyboards, guitar, percussion, trombone (1990–2009, 2019–present)
- Andy Ramsay - drums (1992–2009, 2019–present)
- Joseph Watson - keyboards, vibraphone, backing vocals (2004–2009, 2019–present)
- Xavier Muñoz Guimera - bass guitar, backing vocals (2019–present)

Former members

- Joe Dilworth - drums (1990–1992)
- Martin Kean - bass guitar (1990–1992)
- Gina Morris - backing vocals (1991)
- Mick Conroy - keyboards (1992)
- Mary Hansen - backing and lead vocals, guitar, keyboards, percussion (1992–2002) (died 2002)
- Sean O'Hagan - keyboards, guitar (1993)
- Duncan Brown - bass guitar, backing vocals (1993–1995)
- Katharine Gifford - keyboards (1993–1995)
- Morgane Lhote - keyboards (1995–2001)
- David Pajo - bass guitar, backing vocals (1995)
- Richard Harrison - bass guitar (1996–1998)
- Simon Johns - bass guitar (1999–2009)
- Dominic Jeffery - keyboards (2001–2006)
- Joseph Walters - French horn, guitar, keyboards (2004–2008)
- Julien Gasc - keyboards, backing vocals (2008–2009)

Timeline

== Discography ==
Studio albums

- Peng! (1992)
- Transient Random-Noise Bursts with Announcements (1993)
- Mars Audiac Quintet (1994)
- Emperor Tomato Ketchup (1996)
- Dots and Loops (1997)
- Cobra and Phases Group Play Voltage in the Milky Night (1999)
- Sound-Dust (2001)
- Margerine Eclipse (2004)
- Chemical Chords (2008)
- Not Music (2010)
- Instant Holograms on Metal Film (2025)

Compilation albums Stereolab released many non-LP tracks that they later anthologised as compilation albums.

- Switched On (1992)
- Refried Ectoplasm: Switched On, Vol. 2 (1995)
- Aluminum Tunes: Switched On, Vol. 3 (1998)
- ABC Music: The Radio 1 Sessions (2002)
- Oscillons from the Anti-Sun (2005)
- Fab Four Suture (2006)
- Serene Velocity: A Stereolab Anthology (2006)
- Electrically Possessed: Switched On, Vol. 4 (2021)
- Pulse of the Early Brain: Switched On, Vol. 5 (2022)
