= Here Come the Rattling Trees =

Studio album by The High Llamas
- Released: 22 January 2016
- Genre: Sunshine pop; orchestral pop; exotica
- Length: 27:07
- Label: Drag City

The High Llamas chronology
Talahomi Way (2011)	Here Come the Rattling Trees (2016)	Hey Panda (2024)

Professional ratings
Review scores
Source	Rating
AllMusic	3.5/5 stars
Pitchfork	6.6/10

Here Come the Rattling Trees is the tenth studio album by Anglo-Irish avant-pop band the High Llamas, released on 22 January 2016. It is an adaptation of a 2014 theatrical play that the group premiered at the Tristan Bates Theatre in London's Covent Garden. The play originally featured a cast of actors and actresses, but the album only features instrumental and vocal performances.

== Track listing ==
All tracks are written by Sean O'Hagan.

Here Come the Rattling Trees track listing
No.	Title	Length
1.	"Prelude – A Day in the Square"	2:27
2.	"Amy Recalls – Barnham Trees"	0:35
3.	"Here Come the Rattling Trees"	3:32
4.	"Runner Recalls – Outback Runner"	0:26
5.	"Bramble Underscore"	2:29
6.	"Bramble Black"	1:47
7.	"Mona Underscore – Slow Down Mona"	1:32
8.	"Mona's Song"	1:34
9.	"Decorator Recalls – Step Tempo Has Arrived"	0:21
10.	"McKain Underscore"	0:48
11.	"McKain James"	2:25
12.	"Plumber Recalls – Call Me to the Common"	0:25
13.	"Livorno Underscore"	0:31
14.	"Livorno"	2:17
15.	"Jackie Underscore – The Bells Ring Straight"	2:53
16.	"Jackie"	3:05
Total length:		27:07
