= Duophonic Records =

Duophonic Ultra High Frequency Disks Limited
- Founded: 1991
- Founder: Stereolab
- Genre: Various
- Country of origin: United Kingdom
- Location: London

Duophonic Ultra High Frequency Disks Limited (also known as Duophonic Records or Duophonic Super 45s) is a British independent record label formed by English-French rock band Stereolab in 1991. The label has two imprints: Duophonic Ultra High Frequency Disks for UK Stereolab releases licensed to various labels worldwide, and Duophonic Super 45s for releases of other artists and certain Stereolab UK-only releases. Duophonic's first release was Stereolab's debut EP Super 45 (1991), limited to 880 copies; of these, forty copies had handmade covers that were produced by Martin Pike in his father's garage.

Bands that have released records on Duophonic include Broadcast, the High Llamas, Labradford, Tortoise, Pram, Yo La Tengo, the Notwist, and Apparat Organ Quartet. Daft Punk, one of the most successful electronic bands of the 1990s, released their first songs under the name Darlin' on the 1993 Duophonic compilation Shimmies in Super 8. Duophonic's most successful release is Stereolab's Emperor Tomato Ketchup (1996), which was licensed to Elektra Records outside the UK and has sold over 60,000 copies worldwide.

Duophonic is managed by Martin Pike, and is owned by Tim Gane (34%), Laetitia Sadier (34%), and Pike (32%). Although founded in 1991, the label did not become a limited company until 25 August 1993, when Pike relocated from Horsham, West Sussex, to East Dulwich in the London Borough of Southwark. From there, Pike also runs Associated London Management [2008] Ltd, a company dedicated to the management of bands such as Stereolab, Broadcast, Deerhunter, Atlas Sound, and the High Llamas.

== Duophonic Super 45 discography ==
Year	Artist	Title	Type	Copies	Notes	Catalog number
1991	Stereolab	Super 45	10"	880	40 copies had handmade sleeves	DS45-01
1991	Stereolab	"Stunning Debut Album"	7"	985 on clear vinyl; 200 on multi-colored vinyl	Tracks featured are "Doubt" and "Changer"	DS45-02
1992	Arcwelder	"Favor" b/w "Plastic"	7"	1000 on black vinyl; 300 on amber vinyl		DS45-03
1992	Stereolab	"Harmonium" b/w "Farfisa"	7"	1306 on amber vinyl	All copies came with a fluorescent orange sticker	DS45-04
1993	Various artists	Shimmies in Super 8	Two 7"	800	400 copies had stickers; all featured one 7" green vinyl and one 7" white vinyl. Bands included were Stereolab, Huggy Bear, Darlin', and Colm	DS45-05, DS45-06
1993	Herzfeld	"Two Mothers" b/w "Who the Scroungers Are"	7"	1000		DS45-07
1994	Herzfeld	The Sack	Mini LP	1000		DS45-08
1995	Tortoise	"Gamera" b/w "Cliff Dweller Society"	12"	1500 on red vinyl; 1500 on clear vinyl; 1500 on black vinyl; 1000 on fluorescent yellow vinyl		DS45-09
1995	Yo La Tengo/Stereolab	"The Long Hair of Death" b/w "Evanescent Psychic Pez Drop"	7"	3000 on fluorescent yellow vinyl	All copies came with a fluorescent yellow sticker	DS45-10
1996	Labradford	"Scenic Recovery" b/w "Underwood 5ive"	10"	2500 on black vinyl		DS45-12
1996	Broadcast	"Living Room" b/w "Phantom"	7"	3092 on black vinyl		DS45-14
1996	Pram	Music For Your Movies	CD-EP/12"	1488 on black vinyl; 2313 on CD		DS45-15
1996	Broadcast	The Book Lovers	CD-EP/12"	1968 on black vinyl; 2882 on CD		DS45-16
1997	Stereolab and Nurse with Wound	Simple Headphone Mind	12"	3000 on black vinyl; 1000 on translucent yellow vinyl	A limited run of promotional CDs were also released	DS33-11
1997	Splitting the Atom	"Splitting The Atom (Parts One And Two)" b/w "Monkey Brain	7"	3234 on black vinyl	Features Andy Ramsay and Simon Holliday augmented by Mary Hansen and Sonic Boom	DS45-17
1997	Turn On	Turn On	CD/MiniAlbum		Features Tim Gane, Sean O'Hagan, and Andy Ramsay	DS45-18
1998	Uilab	Fires	12"			DS45-19
1998	Clear Spot	"Moonman Bop" b/w "Psycho's Blues"	7"			DS45-20
1998	Designer	Designer	12"			DS45-21
1998	The Notwist	Shrink	CD			DS45-23
1998	Dymaxion	Forty Five Revolutions Per Minute Sound	7"			DS45-24
1998	Stereolab and Brigitte Fontaine/Monade	"Caliméro" / "Cache Cache"	CD			DS45-CD25
2000	Kev Hopper	Whispering Foils	CD			DS45-CD26/DS33-26
2000	The High Llamas	Buzzle Bee	CD			DS45-CD27
2001	Imitation Electric Piano	Imitation Electric Piano	12", EP			DS45-27
2001	Dymaxion	DYMAXION×4+3=38:33	CD			DS45-CD29/DS33-29
2001	Stereolab	"Free Witch and No-Bra Queen"	7"			DS45-30
2002	Minnow	Out of the Woods	CD			DS45-CD31
2003	Monade	Socialisme Ou Barbarie (The Bedroom Recordings)	CD			DS33-32/DS45-CD32
2003	Imitation Electric Piano	Trinity Neon	CD			DS33-33/DS45-CD33
2003	Apparat Organ Quartet	"Romantika"	CD			DS45-CD34
2003	The High Llamas	Beet, Maize & Corn	CD			DS45-CD35
2005	Seeland	"Wander" / "Pherox"	7"			DS45-36
2006	The Monincs/Zinade	"Play Kevin Ayers"	7"			DS45-37
2006	Stereolab	"Solar Throw-Away"	7"			DS45-48
2006	Imitation Electric Piano	Blow It Up, Burn It Down, Kick It 'Til It Bleeds	CD			DS45-CD38
2006	Seeland	Crimson	12"			DS45-40
2006	The Harry Kari Connection	"I Can't Sleep" / "How I Feel" / "Haunted"	7"			DS45-41
2005	Junior Electronics	Junior Electronics	LP	300		DS45-42
2008	Stereolab	"Explosante Fixe"	7"			DS45-43
2018	Cavern of Anti-Matter	"Play In Fabric"	7"			DS45-44
2020	Astrel-K	"You Could If You Can"	7"			DS45-45
2022	Various artists	An UltraDisco Momento	Cassette		Features Andrew Pekler, Let Drum Beat, Memorials (3), Stereolab, Laetitia Sadier, Malphino, Astrel K, The High Llamas, Junior Electronics	DS45-13MC

== See also ==
- List of record labels
