= Cybele's Reverie =

EP by Stereolab
- Released: 19 February 1996
- Studio: Idful, Chicago, Illinois
- Length: 20:36
- Language: French
- Label: Duophonic
- Producer: John McEntire; Stereolab

Stereolab chronology
Refried Ectoplasm: Switched on, Vol. 2 (1995)	Cybele's Reverie (1996)	Emperor Tomato Ketchup (1996)

Professional ratings
Review scores
Source	Rating
Allmusic	3/5 stars

Cybele's Reverie is an EP by English-French rock band Stereolab, released on 19 February 1996 by Duophonic Records. Its title track serves as the lead single from their fourth studio album Emperor Tomato Ketchup. The four-track EP is the only one by Stereolab on which none of the songs are in English: the title track, "Brigitte", and "Young Lungs" are in French, and "Les Yper-Yper Sound" is an instrumental.

The title track was voted number eleven on John Peel's Festive Fifty for 1996.

All four of its tracks were re-released on the Oscillons from the Anti-Sun compilation.

== Composition ==
"Cybele's Reverie" itself is an early fade of the album version, and "Les Yper-Yper Sound" is a radically different arrangement of the album track "Les Yper-Sound". "Brigitte" pays tribute to Brigitte Fontaine, whom the band would later collaborate with on the single "Caliméro".

== Track listing ==
All tracks by Tim Gane, Laetitia Sadier

1. "Cybele's Reverie" – 2:56
2. "Les Yper-Yper Sound" – 5:19
3. "Brigitte" – 5:45
4. "Young Lungs" – 6:36

== Personnel ==
- Mary Hansen – Vocals
- Sally Herbert – Strings
- Marcus Holdaway – Strings
- John McEntire – Synthesizer, Maracas, Tambourine, Producer, Engineer, Vibraphone, Mixing, Electronic Devices
- Sean O'Hagan – Organ, Piano (Electric), String Arrangements, Wurlitzer, Vox Organ
- Stereolab – Producer, Mixing
- Paul Tipler – Producer, Engineer, Mixing
- Brad Wood – Saxophone

== Charts ==
Chart (1996)	Peak position
UK Singles (OCC)	62
