= Buzzle Bee =

Studio album by the High Llamas
- Released: 23 October 2000 (U.S.)
- Genre: Pop; symphonic pop
- Length: 39:49
- Label: Duophonic; Drag City
- Producer: Fulton Dingley, the High Llamas

The High Llamas chronology
Snowbug (1999)	Buzzle Bee (2000)	Retrospective, Rarities and Instrumentals (2003)

Buzzle Bee is a studio album by English band the High Llamas. It was released in 2000 on Duophonic.

== Critical reception ==
Professional ratings
Review scores
Source	Rating
AllMusic	3/5 stars
The Encyclopedia of Popular Music	3/5 stars
Pitchfork	6.0/10

Exclaim! wrote: "Buzzle Bee proves that the Llamas have established a signature sound and much of it is faultlessly beautiful. There's a sense, though, that it's also an apex; if their music isn't to become as comfortable as all those Beach Boys comparisons are tiresome, some genuine surprises will need to occur next time." NME wrote that "'The Passing Bell' is brilliant Capri-Sun pop – and O’Hagan knows it, because he lets it meander on beautifully for ten minutes. After that, we’re at the mercy of his wayward desire to say nothing of any consequence in the style of Holland-era Brian Wilson with sunstroke."

== Track listing ==
All songs written by Sean O'Hagan.

1. "The Passing Bell" – 6:31
2. "Pat Mingus" – 4:25
3. "Get Into the Galley Shop" – 4:38
4. "Switch Pavilion" – 4:28
5. "Tambourine Day" – 3:36
6. "Sleeping Spray" – 5:05
7. "New Broadway" – 5:11
8. "Bobby's Court" – 5:55

Some editions of the album include the song "2 Part Byke" (6:04).

== Personnel and credits ==
The High Llamas

- Rob Allum
- Jon Fell
- Marcus Holdaway
- Sean O'Hagan

Songs written by Sean O'Hagan and arranged by the High Llamas. All music played and arranged by the High Llamas with Dominic Murcott on vibes and marimba, Pete Aves on 12-string guitar and John Bennet on slide guitar. John Teffer played tenor sax and flute and Andy Ramsay played modular synth. Fulton Dingley is heard on electronic bits and pieces. Mary Hansen and Susan James sang backing vocals on "Get Into the Gallery Shop" and "Tambourine Day". Hansen sings on "Switch Pavilion" and "Tambourine Day". The chorus on "The Passing Bell" is Emma Carter, Kelsey Michael, Jo Haynes, Mary Hansen and Susan James.

The album was recorded by Fulton Dingley and mixed by Fulton Dingley and the High Llamas except "Bobby's Court" which was recorded by Dominic Murcott and mixed by Murcott and O'Hagan. It was recorded and mixed at Blackwing Studios London except "Bobby's Court" which was recorded at Pinny Sound.

Cover design by M2.
