= Gideon Gaye =

Studio album by the High Llamas
- Released: 1994
- Recorded: Late 1993 – early 1994
- Genres: Experimental pop; art pop
- Length: 54:48
- Label: Target
- Producers: Charles Francis; Sean O'Hagan

The High Llamas chronology
| Santa Barbara (1992) | Gideon Gaye (1994) | Hawaii (1996) |

Singles from Gideon Gaye
- 1. "Checking in, Checking Out" Released: 5 October 1995

Gideon Gaye is the second studio album by the Anglo-Irish avant-pop band the High Llamas, released in 1994 on the Brighton-based Target label. Notable for anticipating the mid 1990s easy-listening revivalism, the album's music was influenced by Brian Wilson, Steely Dan, Brazilian bossa nova and European film soundtracks, and was recorded with a £4000 budget. It was met with high praise by the British press. Q dubbed the LP "the best Beach Boys album since 1968's Friends". In the US, the album was indifferently promoted.

== Background ==
Upon release, bandleader Sean O'Hagan responded to Beach Boys comparisons: "There are aspects that are blatantly Brian-esque, because I've always been a huge Brian [Wilson] fan. He has been the biggest influence in my career to date. I was always shy [about] how much I liked him, but this time I decided to be blatant about it. But then I'm also a huge John Cale fan." The album's sleeve art is a homage to Van Dyke Parks' 1967 album Song Cycle, which uses the same Torino Italic Flair typeface.

== Critical reception ==
Professional ratings
Review scores
| Source | Rating |
|---|---|
| AllMusic | 4.5/5 stars |
| The Guardian | 4/5 stars |
| Select | 4/5 |

Scott Schinder of Trouser Press reviewed: "The result is a homespun, heartfelt art-pop masterpiece, with airy arrangements and gorgeous melodies in richly detailed tunes — 'The Dutchman,' 'Checking In, Checking Out,' 'The Goat Looks On' and the fourteen-minute 'Track Goes By' — that liberally quote Brian Wilson's lost classic [Smile] without sacrificing O'Hagan's purposefully playful point of view." Writer Tim Page called the album "suffused throughout with a gentle wistfulness that is never made quite explicit ... [the album] is also intriguing on a purely formal level. The album's centerpiece is 'The Goat Looks On,' yet the entire disc might be described as a study of the creation of a song called 'The Goat Looks On.'"

Critic Richie Unterberger opined: "It's an impressive outing that sounds like little else in the alternative rock world of the mid-'90s. But it only establishes O'Hagan and his various pals as charming emulators, rather than true innovators. CMJ New Music Monthly's Steve McGuirl wrote of the album: "A tad academic, perhaps; but to dismiss Gideon Gaye as merely retro cheapens a beautiful record and the music that inspired it."

== Track listing ==
All tracks are written by Sean O'Hagan.

| No. | Title | Length |
|---|---|---|
| 1. | "Giddy Strings" | 0:27 |
| 2. | "The Dutchman" | 4:41 |
| 3. | "Giddy and Gay" | 4:55 |
| 4. | "Easy Rod" | 2:04 |
| 5. | "Checking In, Checking Out" | 5:45 |
| 6. | "The Goat Strings" | 2:06 |
| 7. | "Up in the Hills" | 4:57 |
| 8. | "The Goat Looks On" | 6:13 |
| 9. | "Taog Skool No" | 1:36 |
| 10. | "Little Collie" | 0:44 |
| 11. | "Track Goes By" | 14:13 |
| 12. | "Let's Have Another Look" | 0:50 |
| 13. | "The Goat (Instrumental)" (CD only) | 6:17 |
| Total length: | | 54:48 |

== Personnel ==
Per AllMusic.

The High Llamas

- Rob Allum – drums, percussion
- John Fell – bass
- Marcus Holdaway – cello, harpsichord, organ, piano, upright piano, string arrangements, vibe master, vibraphone, vocals, background vocals, Vox organ
- Sean O'Hagan – composer, glockenspiel, guitar, Moog bass, Moog synthesizer, organ, piano, upright piano, producer, string arrangements, vocals, background vocals, Vox organ

Additional staff

- Andre – layout design
- Charles Francis – engineer, producer
- Anthony Lyons – layout design
- Jocelyn Pook – viola
- Anne Wood – violin

== Charts ==
| Chart (1995) | Peak position |
|---|---|
| UK Albums (Official Charts) | 94 |
