= Talahomi Way =

Studio album by the High Llamas
- Released: 19 April 2011 (U.S.)
- Genre: Pop
- Length: 36:16
- Label: Drag City

The High Llamas chronology
Can Cladders (2007)	Talahomi Way (2011)	Here Come the Rattling Trees (2016)

Professional ratings
Review scores
Source	Rating
AllMusic	4/5 stars
Pitchfork Media	6.8/10

Talahomi Way is the ninth studio album by London-based musical project the High Llamas, released on 19 April 2011 on Drag City.

== Track listing ==
1. "Berry Adams" – 4:10
2. "Wander, Jack Wander" – 3:40
3. "Take My Hand" – 2:34
4. "Woven and Rolled" – 3:09
5. "The Ring of Gold" – 4:11
6. "Talahomi Way" – 3:32
7. "Fly Baby, Fly" – 3:00
8. "Angel Connector" – 1:01
9. "To the Abbey" – 3:17
10. "A Rock in May" – 3:21
11. "Crazy Connector" – 0:40
12. "Calling Up, Ringing Down" – 3:44
