= Hey Panda =

Studio album by the High Llamas
- Released: 29 March 2024
- Length: 39:50
- Label: Drag City
- Producer: Sean O'Hagan

The High Llamas chronology
Here Come the Rattling Trees (2016)	Hey Panda (2024)

Hey Panda is the eleventh studio album by the Anglo-Irish avant-pop band the High Llamas, released on 29 March 2024 through Drag City. It is the band's first album in eight years, since the release of Here Come the Rattling Trees in 2016.

== Critical reception ==
Professional ratings
Aggregate scores
Source	Rating
Metacritic	87/100
Review scores
Source	Rating
AllMusic	4/5 stars
Mojo	4/5 stars
MusicOMH	5/5 stars
Uncut	9/10

Hey Panda received a score of 87 out of 100 on review aggregator Metacritic based on eight critics' reviews, indicating "universal acclaim". Uncut called it "beautifully now", while Mojo wrote that it "may seem whimsical at first, but its depth is all the grander for the work it takes to mine its many gems". MusicOMH's Steven Johnson stated that Hey Panda "reinforces the view that O'Hagan is a special composer and bandleader of note. It sees him push himself creatively further than he's ever done to date, delivering a unique, fascinating, compelling album in the process".

Ryan Dillon of Glide Magazine felt that "these twelve songs carry the weight of time as it feels like we are reintroduced to the band despite their storied tenure as pop's most unpredictable offering strikes again with ambitious concepts executed to the highest order".

=== Year-end lists ===
Select year-end rankings for Hey Panda
Publication/critic	Accolade	Rank	Ref.
Uncut	80 Best Albums of 2024	23	

== Track listing ==
All lyrics are written by Sean O'Hagan, except "How the West Was Won" with lyrics by Will Oldham; all music is composed by O'Hagan.

Hey Panda track listing
No.	Title	Length
1.	"Hey Panda"	3:32
2.	"Fall Off the Mountain"	2:41
3.	"Bade Amey"	3:04
4.	"Sisters Friends" (featuring Rae Morris)	3:24
5.	"How the Best Was Won" (featuring Bonnie "Prince" Billy)	2:59
6.	"The Grade"	3:09
7.	"Yoga Goat"	2:53
8.	"Stone Cold Slow"	3:16
9.	"Toriafan"	3:21
10.	"Hungriest Man" (featuring Bonnie "Prince" Billy)	5:01
11.	"The Water Moves"	2:48
12.	"La Masse" (featuring Fryars)	3:42
Total length:		39:50

== Personnel ==
The High Llamas

- Sean O'Hagan – vocals, pianos, synthesizers, guitars, bass, synthesizer programming, arrangements, production, mixing, cover painting
- Jon Fell – bass on "The Grade" and "Stone Cold Slow"
- Marcus Holdaway - vocals on "Stone Cold Slow"
- Rob Allum – drums, percussion

Additional contributors

- Fryars – mixing, programming and vocals on "Hay Panda" and "The Grade"
- Livvy O'Hagan – vocals on "Hey Panda", "Fall Off the Mountain", and "The Grade"
- Rae Morris – lead vocals on "Sisters Friends"
- Bonnie "Prince" Billy – vocals on "How the West Was Won"
- Andy Ramsay – drum recording
- Dan Osborn – layout

== Charts ==
Chart performance for Hey Panda
Chart (2024)	Peak position
UK Album Downloads (OCC)	64
