= Hawaii (The High Llamas album) =

Studio album by The High Llamas
- Released: 25 March 1996
- Genre: Chamber pop; orchestral pop; easy listening; lounge
- Length: 1:16:48
- Label: Alpaca Park
- Producer: Charles Francis; Sean O'Hagan

The High Llamas chronology
Gideon Gaye (1994)	Hawaii (1996)	Cold and Bouncy (1998)

Singles from Hawaii
- 1. "Nomads" Released: 1996

Hawaii is the third studio album by the Anglo-Irish avant-pop band the High Llamas, released on 25 March 1996 on the band's Alpaca Park label. The arrangements of Hawaii incorporate more electronic sounds than its predecessor Gideon Gaye (1994), while its lyrics loosely address themes of nomadism, nostalgia, film and musical theatre, and the effects of colonialism. The record peaked at 62 on the UK Albums Chart for a one-week stay. In the United States, the album was issued with a 40-minute bonus CD containing material that was previously unreleased in that region.

== Overview ==
Bandleader Sean O'Hagan described the album as a fusion between the music of the "post mid-European Stockhausen era" and the "really screwed up West Coast American sort of music, of the Wrecking Crew variety". Academic Theodore Gracyk characterized the majority of Hawaii as "pay[ing] unmistakable homage to Brian Wilson's arrangements on the Beach Boys' Pet Sounds (1966). More specifically, they recall Pet Sounds' distinctive wash of background vocal harmonies, lush but wordless, against piano, melodic bass punctuation, drum fills, and sleigh bells." On the album's influences, music critic Tim Page writes: "Here, in no particular order, we find flashes of Wilson, Henry Mancini, harpsichord flourishes, 'Ramona'-style Mexican American music (complete with mariachi pulses and firefly strings), melodies that would sound just right around a campfire, swooning Hawaiian guitars, long trumpet solos that would have done Bunny Berigan proud, and just about everything else -- layer upon layer."

In the mid-1990s, Wilson was struggling to organize a comeback album with the Beach Boys and collaborator Andy Paley. After Wilson's bandmate Bruce Johnston heard Hawaii, an attempt was made to instead coordinate a collaboration between O'Hagan and Wilson, although it never progressed past the planning stages. At one of the meetings with Wilson and his wife, O'Hagan remembered,

Melinda said, "Brian, we want you to make a record, and Sean will oversee it." And Brian says, "who's Sean?" Melinda said, "He's the guy who made that record you like, Hawaii." And he says, "The Hawaii guy? Are you the Hawaii guy? You made that record? Too much! Far out! Music, man. So much music!"

== Critical reception ==
Professional ratings
Review scores
Source	Rating
AllMusic	4/5 stars
Wall of Sound	45/100

Page lauded Hawaii as "one of the most complicated albums of popular music ever made. If so much of early American classical music was a new gloss on European manners, this is a decidedly European take on American popular music ... it is in many ways a dense and difficult album ... [listen] only once you're acclimated to the High Llamas."

Online publication Treblezine listed it as one of the 10 most essential chamber pop albums, with staff writer Paul Pearson elaborating: "For all its precise pastiche, Hawaii is still a maverick work existing entirely on its own. ... there’s also a thinly annotated, very abstract lyrical narrative about the colonization and Americanization of Hawaii that’s fun to figure out, if you’re that kind of proactive researcher. That concept might be the most twee idea in rock history, but the High Llamas execute Hawaii with so much expertise and wonder that you don’t notice it." Spin's Erik Himmelsbach wrote: "Supposedly a 'concept' record, the album's Hawaiian theme is merely an excuse for O'Hagan's orchestral maneuvers and precious melodies—folky, tropical, eccentric—which swirl and whirl like a psychedelic summit of Lawrence Welk and Don Ho. ... And so it goes, until you're not sure if Hawaii is the greatest record you've ever heard, or if you've just spent too much time at the dentist's office."

AllMusic's Stephen Thomas Erlewine reviewed: "For much of Hawaii, the sound of the record is intoxicating, but the album drags over the course of 77 minutes. Among the 29 tracks, there are some beautiful moments and gorgeous songs, but Hawaii winds up being too much of a good thing, lacking the focus of Gideon Gaye."

== Track listing ==
All tracks are written by Sean O'Hagan.

Hawaii
No.	Title	Length
1.	"Cuckoo Casino"	0:53
2.	"Sparkle Up"	4:53
3.	"Literature Is Fluff"	4:58
4.	"Nomads"	4:03
5.	"Snapshot Pioneer"	0:34
6.	"Ill-Fitting Suits"	3:40
7.	"Recent Orienteering"	0:44
8.	"The Hot Revivalist"	4:40
9.	"Phoney Racehorse"	0:23
10.	"Dressing Up the Old Dakota"	4:37
11.	"D.C. 8"	0:25
12.	"Doo-Wop Property"	4:56
13.	"Theatreland"	2:21
14.	"A Friendly Pioneer"	0:37
15.	"Cuckoo's Out"	4:17
16.	"Peppy"	4:45
17.	"There's Nobody Home"	0:59
18.	"The Hokey Curator"	1:18
19.	"Campers in Control"	4:47
20.	"Double Drift"	0:37
21.	"Island People"	3:12
22.	"Incidentally N.E.O."	2:16
23.	"Tides"	3:43
24.	"Nomad Strings"	0:34
25.	"Pilgrims"	3:22
26.	"Rustic Vespa"	0:31
27.	"Folly Time"	1:58
28.	"Hawaiian Smile"	2:48
29.	"Instrumental Suits"	3:47
Total length:		76:48

=== Bonus disc ===
All tracks are written by Sean O'Hagan, except "Chime of a City Clock" by Nick Drake and O'Hagan.

No.	Title	Length
1.	"Might as Well Be Dumbo"	4:55
2.	"Cropduster"	7:48
3.	"Mini-Management"	9:09
4.	"Chime of a City Clock"	5:12
5.	"Literature Is Fluff" (Instrumental version)	5:00
6.	"3 Frame Offset"	6:34
Total length:		38:38

== Personnel ==
Adapted from AllMusic.

The High Llamas

- Rob Allum – bells, drum effects, drums, percussion, rattles
- John Bennett – guitar, lap steel guitar, backing vocals
- Marcus Holdaway – cello, clavinet, harmonium, harpsichord, piano, upright piano, string arrangements, vibraphone, backing vocals, Vox organ
- Sean O'Hagan – arranger, banjo, guitar, harmonium, harpsichord, Moog synthesizer, piano, upright piano, rhythm, string arrangements, vibraphone, vocals, background vocals, Vox organ

Additional staff

- Colin Crawley – flute, tenor saxophone
- Charlie Francis – engineer, loop editing, Mini-Moog, tape editor
- Andy Gibson – flugelhorn, trumpet
- Sally Herbert – violin
- Mark Lockheart – flute, tenor saxophone
- Anthony Lyons – layout design
- Andy Robinson – brass arrangement, trombone
- Steve Rooke – mastering
- Jayne Spencer – violin
- Steve Waterman – flugelhorn, trumpet
- Anne Wood – violin

== Charts ==
Chart	Peak position
UK Albums (OCC)	62
