= Imitation Electric Piano =

- Origin: Brighton, England
- Genres: Post-rock, Indie rock
- Years active: 1999–present
- Labels: Duophonic (UK); Drag City (US)
- Members: Simon Johns; Andrew Blake; Etienne Rodes; Jo Bramli; Lee Adams
- Past members: Christopher Baker; Dan Boyd; David Campbell; Mary Hampton; Dominic Jeffrey; Ashley Marlowe; Paul Morgan

Imitation Electric Piano is a British post-rock band, formed in 1999 by Stereolab bassist Simon Johns and Andrew Blake on guitar.

== History ==
They recorded their eponymous instrumental first EP for Duophonic Records' 'Super 45s' series in 1999.

The band's first album, Trinity Neon was released in 2003. Line-ups have included Ashley Marlowe on drums (Charlottefield), Dominic Jeffery on keyboards (Stereolab), Paul Morgan on guitar (Rubber Bus), David Campbell on keyboards (I'm Being Good), Joe Watson on keyboards (Stereolab) and singer Mary Hampton. The most recent line-up comprised Etienne Rodes (bass), Jo Bramli (vocals) and Lee Adams (drums).

The band's second LP, Blow It Up, Burn It Down, Kick It 'Til It Bleeds, was released in October 2006.

The group has been on a hiatus since Simon relocated to Istanbul in 2007. Johns currently has a programme on Istanbul independent radio station Acik Radyo 94.9FM.

== Discography ==
- Imitation Electric Piano (Duophonic, 1999)
- Trinity Neon (Duophonic, 2003)
- Blow It Up, Burn It Down, Kick It 'Til It Bleeds (Duophonic, 2006)
