= Beet, Maize & Corn =

Studio album by The High Llamas
- Released: 7 October 2003 (U.S.)
- Genre: Chamber pop
- Length: 40:23
- Label: Drag City
- Producer: Fulton Dingley, Sean O'Hagan

The High Llamas chronology
Retrospective, Rarities and Instrumentals (2003)	Beet, Maize & Corn (2003)	Can Cladders (2007)

Professional ratings
Review scores
Source	Rating
AllMusic	4.5/5 stars
LAS Magazine	Favourable
Pitchfork Media	(6.0/10)

Beet, Maize & Corn is the seventh studio album by London-based musical project The High Llamas, released on 7 October 2003 on Drag City. The style of the album is a notable departure from earlier High Llamas efforts, eschewing all electronic keyboards and effects in favor of a sound dominated by brass and strings.

== Track listing ==
1. "Barny Mix" – 3:48
2. "Calloway" – 5:01
3. "The Click and the Fizz" – 4:01
4. "Porter Dimi" – 3:24
5. "Leaf and Lime" – 3:27
6. "Alexandra Line" – 0:19
7. "High on the Chalk" – 3:30
8. "Rotary Hop" – 5:11
9. "Ribbons and Hi-Hats" – 1:31
10. "The Holly Hills" – 1:50
11. "Monnie" – 3:44
12. "The Walworth River" – 4:37
