= Emperor Tomato Ketchup (album) =

Studio album by Stereolab
- Released: 18 March 1996
- Recorded: 1995
- Studios: Blackwing, London, UK; Idful, Chicago, Illinois
- Genres: Experimental pop; psychedelic pop; post-rock
- Length: 57:15
- Labels: Duophonic; Elektra
- Producers: John McEntire; Paul Tipler; Stereolab

Stereolab chronology
Cybele's Reverie (1996)	Emperor Tomato Ketchup (1996)	Fluorescences (1996)

Singles from Emperor Tomato Ketchup
- 1. "Cybele's Reverie" Released: 19 February 1996; 2. "Metronomic Underground" Released: 2 December 1996

Emperor Tomato Ketchup is the fourth studio album by English-French rock band Stereolab. It was released on 18 March 1996 and was issued by Duophonic Records and Elektra Records.

The album is named after the 1971 experimental film Emperor Tomato Ketchup by Japanese author and director Shūji Terayama.

== Composition and recording ==
On Emperor Tomato Ketchup, Stereolab experimented with composing songs around looped sounds instead of traditional riffs. Critic Tom Moon found the band's compositional approach reminiscent of hip hop and electronica music, with loops being layered into "richly textured collages".

Guitarist Tim Gane remarked that the shift in style from previous releases emerged from a year-long bout of writer's block, where the band felt they were "drifting about in a musical landscape that wasn't inspiring or particularly exciting. With nothing on the horizon, everything we tried out seemed to be a dead end". The group began working on a cover of the Godz' "ABC" for a tribute album. The challenge of covering a song that was essentially a free improvisation proved to be invigorating: Gane adapted four notes from the track and looped them, providing the basis for an early take on the song "Percolator". This reliance on loops rather than their earlier drone-based approach provided the blueprint for much of the album's direction. The recording sessions for Emperor Tomato Ketchup were split between working with John McEntire in Chicago and Paul Tipler in London.

== Release ==
Emperor Tomato Ketchup was released on 18 March 1996 in the United Kingdom by Duophonic Records, and on 9 April 1996 in the United States by Elektra Records. The artwork for the album was inspired by the LP cover sleeve of a 1964 recording of composer Béla Bartók's Concerto for Orchestra by the Bamberg Symphony conducted by Heinrich Hollreiser.

Preceding the album's release, the track "Cybele's Reverie" was issued as a single (on 7" vinyl) and as an EP (on CD and 10" vinyl) on 19 February 1996. A second single, "Metronomic Underground", was released on 2 December 1996. "The Noise of Carpet" was also promoted as a single to radio outlets in the United States.

AllMusic writer Heather Phares cites Emperor Tomato Ketchup as "Stereolab's greatest success to date". In the US, the album was especially successful on college radio, and by August 1997, the album had sold over 46,000 units in the country, according to Nielsen SoundScan.

A remastered and expanded edition of Emperor Tomato Ketchup was released by Duophonic and Warp on 13 September 2019.

== Critical reception and legacy ==
Professional ratings
Review scores
Source	Rating
AllMusic	5/5 stars
Entertainment Weekly	B+
The Guardian	4/5 stars
Mojo	4/5 stars
NME	8/10
Pitchfork	9.4/10
Record Collector	5/5 stars
The Rolling Stone Album Guide	4.5/5 stars
Uncut	9/10
The Village Voice	A−

On its release, Emperor Tomato Ketchup earned positive reviews from music critics.

In 2004's The New Rolling Stone Album Guide, Roni Sarig wrote that Stereolab created their "most well-rounded, confident, and accomplished statement" with Emperor Tomato Ketchup, forgoing their earlier lo-fi aesthetic and crafting "an impeccably produced, creatively mixed collection that's a joy to behold in its full high-fidelity glory." Stephen Thomas Erlewine of AllMusic stated that "Stereolab were poised for a breakthrough" with Emperor Tomato Ketchup given both their growing influence on alternative rock and their increasingly accessible musical direction. He noted that the album saw the band composing hookier songs while incorporating "more avant-garde and experimental influences", resulting in it being their "most complex, multi-layered record." Record Collector's Oregano Rathbone likewise said that Emperor Tomato Ketchup contained "defining examples of Stereolab's rewardingly oxymoronic tendencies".

Emperor Tomato Ketchup has appeared in numerous lists of the greatest albums. Spin named it the 46th best album of the 1990s. It was ranked 51st on Pitchfork's list of the decade's best albums, with staff writer Brent DiCrescenzo praising it as Stereolab's "most definitive and recommended statement" and recalling that it "sounded wholly futuristic and alien" at the time of its release. Tom Moon included Emperor Tomato Ketchup in his book 1,000 Recordings to Hear Before You Die (2008), and it was also included in the book 1001 Albums You Must Hear Before You Die.

== Track listing ==
All tracks are written by Tim Gane and Lætitia Sadier, except where noted.

No.	Title	Writer(s)	Length
1.	"Metronomic Underground"		7:55
2.	"Cybele's Reverie"		4:42
3.	"Percolator"	Gane; Sadier; Sean O'Hagan	3:47
4.	"Les Yper-Sound"		4:05
5.	"Spark Plug"		2:29
6.	"OLV 26"		5:42
7.	"The Noise of Carpet"		3:05
8.	"Tomorrow Is Already Here"		4:56
9.	"Emperor Tomato Ketchup"		4:37
10.	"Monstre Sacre"		3:44
11.	"Motoroller Scalatron"		3:48
12.	"Slow Fast Hazel"		3:53
13.	"Anonymous Collective"		4:32
Total length:			57:15

- On the expanded edition, "Percolator" is extended to 4:14, "Les Yper-Sound" is extended to 4:17, and "Slow Fast Hazel" is extended to 4:06.

Japanese edition bonus track
No.	Title	Length
14.	"Brigitte"	5:45
Total length:		63:00

2019 expanded edition bonus disc
No.	Title	Length
1.	"Freestyle Dumpling"	3:57
2.	"Noise of Carpet" (original mix)	3:07
3.	"Old Lungs"	8:00
4.	"Percolator" (original mix)	4:54
5.	"Cybele's Reverie" (demo)	2:06
6.	"Spark Plug" (demo)	1:29
7.	"Spinal Column" (demo)	0:54
8.	"Emperor Tomato Ketchup" (demo)	2:14
9.	"Les Yper-Sound" (demo)	0:53
10.	"Metronomic Underground" (demo)	2:49
11.	"Percolator" (demo)	1:00
12.	"Tomorrow Is Already Here" (demo)	2:35
13.	"Brigitte" (demo)	3:08
14.	"Motoroller Scalatron" (demo)	1:48
15.	"Anonymous Collective" (demo)	2:20
Total length:		41:14

== Personnel ==
Credits are adapted from the album's liner notes.

Stereolab

- Stereolab – vocals, percussion, bass, guitar, Farfisa and Vox organs, analogue synthesizer, electronics, electric piano, tambourine, vibraphone, other instruments
  - Tim Gane
  - Lætitia Sadier
  - Duncan Brown
  - Mary Hansen
  - Morgane Lhote
  - Andy Ramsay

Additional musicians

- Ray Dickarty – alto saxophone on "Percolator"
- Mandy Drummond – strings
- Meg Gates – strings
- Sally Herbert – strings
- Marcus Holdaway – strings
- John McEntire – analogue synthesizer, electronics, maracas, tambourine, vibraphone and guitar on "Tomorrow Is Already Here"
- Sean O'Hagan – Wurlitzer piano, Vox organ, vibraphone, string arrangements

Production

- John McEntire – production, engineering, mixing
- Stereolab (credited as "The Groop") – production, mixing
- Paul Tipler – production, engineering, mixing

== Charts ==
Chart (1996)	Peak position
European Top 100 Albums (Music & Media)	61
Scottish Albums (Official Charts)	50
UK Albums (Official Charts)	27
UK Independent Albums (OCC)	5
US Heatseekers Albums (Billboard)	27

Chart (2019)	Peak position
Scottish Albums (Official Charts)	29
US Top Album Sales (Billboard)	67
