= Cold and Bouncy =

Studio album by the High Llamas
- Released: 27 January 1998
- Recorded: 1997
- Studio: Blackwing, London
- Genre: Electronica
- Length: 62:39
- Label: V2

The High Llamas chronology
Hawaii (1996)	Cold and Bouncy (1998)	Lollo Rosso (1998)

Cold and Bouncy is the fourth studio album by Anglo-Irish avant-pop band the High Llamas, released on 27 January 1998 by V2 Records. According to bandleader Sean O'Hagan, the title refers to electronica's "paradoxical" combination of "cold" or digital sounds and "bouncy" rhythms.

== Background and recording ==
After the release of the High Llamas' previous album, Hawaii (1996), O'Hagan was contacted to produce an album for the Beach Boys. O'Hagan played early versions of Cold and Bouncy tracks to the Beach Boys' Bruce Johnston and Al Jardine, who suggested that their band record his songs. This project was ultimately abandoned.

Cold and Bouncy was recorded in 1997 at Blackwing Studios in London. Several months after its release, it was followed with Lollo Rosso (13 October 1998), which contains seven of the album's tracks remixed individually by Mouse on Mars, Cornelius, Schneider TM, Jim O'Rourke, Kid Loco, Stock, Hausen & Walkman, and the High Llamas themselves.

== Critical reception ==
Professional ratings
Review scores
Source	Rating
AllMusic	3.5/5 stars
Uncut	4/5 stars
Wall of Sound	73/100

Billboard's review stated: "Masters of evoking the sound and spirit of such American pop music masters as Brian Wilson and Burt Bacharach, the U.K.-based High Llamas now turn their focus toward European soundtrack music, smooth bossa nova rhythms, and '70s German electronic music ... the mostly instrumental album toys with all manner of pop exotica yet somehow manages to sound contemporary. A smooth left turn by a band that always keeps its fans on their toes."

CMJ New Music Monthly's Chris Nickson said that the album is "far from cold, and instead of bouncy, it's more like a walk through the clouds. Sean O'Hagan still wears the hearts of Brian Wilson and Van Dyke Parks on his sleeve, but finally his adventurous work with Stereolab shines through ... whereas it previously seemed as if Sean O'Hagan was wanting to make the ultimate Beach Boys album, this time he's really found his own voice and made a superb High Llamas record."

AllMusic's Stephen Thomas Erlewine wrote: "Cold and Bouncy is an accurate description of the High Llamas' music, in many ways. On the surface, it's light and airy, with sprightly or sighing melodies, sometimes quite detailed, but that very attention to detail keeps the music at an emotional distance ... While it's not the marathon of Hawaii, the album still runs way too long, lasting well over an hour. Instead of adding depth, the length makes O'Hagan's ideas difficult to assimilate, and by the end of the record, it sounds like he only has variations on a handful of themes. But when the album is consumed in small doses, however, O'Hagan's flair for arrangement and sonic detail burns brightly."

== Track listing ==
All tracks are written by Sean O'Hagan.

Cold and Bouncy
No.	Title	Length
1.	"Twisto Teck"	0:45
2.	"The Sun Beats Down"	3:48
3.	"HiBall Nova Scotia"	4:59
4.	"Tilting Windmills"	4:10
5.	"Glide Time"	4:32
6.	"Bouncy Glimmer"	1:15
7.	"Three Point Scrabble"	5:24
8.	"Homespin Rerun"	5:22
9.	"Painters Paint"	3:50
10.	"Evergreen Vampo"	3:40
11.	"Showstop Hip Hop"	6:09
12.	"Over the River"	3:59
13.	"End on Tick Tock"	1:44
14.	"Didball"	4:03
15.	"Jazzed Carpenter"	4:18
16.	"Lobby Bears"	4:41
Total length:		62:39

Lollo Rosso
No.	Title	Remixer	Length
1.	"Showstop Hic Hup"	Mouse on Mars	6:36
2.	"Homespin Rerun"	Cornelius	6:12
3.	"Homerun Ubershow"	Schneider TM	7:37
4.	"Mini-Management"	Jim O'Rourke	8:25
5.	"The Space Raid Remix"	Kid Loco	7:47
6.	"Reflections in a Plastic Glass"	Stock, Hausen & Walkman	5:13
7.	"Milting Tindmills"	The High Llamas	4:18
Total length:			46:08
