= Can Cladders =

Studio album by the High Llamas
- Released: 19 February 2007 (U.S.)
- Genre: Pop
- Length: 39:42
- Label: Drag City

The High Llamas chronology
Beet, Maize & Corn (2003)	Can Cladders (2007)	Talahomi Way (2011)

Can Cladders is a studio album by London-based musical project the High Llamas. It was released in 2007 on Drag City.

== Production ==
The High Llamas spent three years working on the album.

== Critical reception ==
Professional ratings
Review scores
Source	Rating
AllMusic	4/5 stars
The A.V. Club	A−
The Guardian	3/5 stars
Pitchfork Media	7.3/10
Stylus Magazine	C+
Tiny Mix Tapes	4/5 stars

The Guardian wrote that "packed with vividly coloured melodies, these songs have a luminous quality, but they also confuse the hypnotic with the repetitive, and richness of texture with gluttonous excess." Exclaim! wrote that "the vibe throughout Can Cladders is too dreamily lethargic to sustain prolonged interest." The Cleveland Scene wrote that the album "bubbles with a bossa-nova pulse, where cascading strings sidle up to a late-night beachside piano bar."

== Track listing ==
1. "The Old Spring Town" – 3:29
2. "Winter's Day" – 4:48
3. "Sailing Bells" – 3:03
4. "Boing Backwards" – 0:44
5. "Honeytrop" – 3:40
6. "Bacaroo" – 3:23
7. "Can Cladders" – 3:26
8. "Something About Paper" – 0:38
9. "Clarion Union Hall" – 4:32
10. "Cove Cutter" – 4:13
11. "Dorothy Ashby" – 3:03
12. "Rollin'" – 3:52
13. "Summer Seen" – 0:51
