= Mary Hampton =

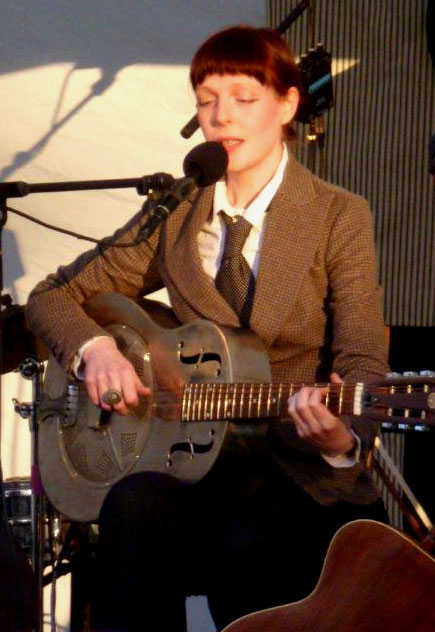
Mary Hampton playing at Packwood House 2011

Mary Hampton is a folk singer, songwriter, accordionist and guitarist from Brighton, England.

Hampton has released two self-produced CD-Rs, Book One (2006) and Book Two (2007), containing a mix of original and traditional songs. In 2008 she released My Mother's Children, her first commercially available album, on Navigator Records. The album has been described as "a sparse collection of her own songs, which recline with shimmering sensuality in various shady cloaks of weirdness" and as "songs of unnerving delicacy, elemental and acoustic simplicity...potent and enchanting".

In addition, Hampton contributed vocals to Rough Music, a 2005 album by Eliza Carthy, and sang on Blow It Up, Burn It Down, Kick It 'Til It Bleeds, a 2006 album by Stereolab side project Imitation Electric Piano.

Hampton appeared at the 2008 Green Man Festival. One review described her set was described as "genuinely memorable".

In June 2009 she toured the UK alongside American singer Diane Cluck.

In June 2011 she toured the UK with her band Mary Hampton Cotillion (made up of musicians Seth Bennett, Jo Burke, Alice Eldridge and Alistair Strachan). Dates included a show at Blaise Castle in Bristol and an inaugural performance in the new rooftop garden at Queen Elizabeth Hall on London's South Bank.

In July 2011, Rough Trade put out a limited edition 7" of the songs "Honey in the Rock" and "Hoax and Benison" from her album "Folly".
