= Snowbug =

Studio album by the High Llamas
- Released: 1999
- Genre: Pop
- Label: Alpaca/V2
- Producer: The High Llamas

The High Llamas chronology
Lollo Rosso (1998)	Snowbug (1999)	Buzzle Bee (2000)

Snowbug is an album by the Anglo-Irish band the High Llamas, released in 1999. It was a commercial failure.

The album's first single was "Cookie Bay".

== Production ==
The album was produced by the High Llamas, and engineered by John McEntire. Mary Hansen and Laetitia Sadier sang on "Cookie Bay". Unlike previous albums, Snowbug was mainly improvised in the studio, with frontman Sean O'Hagan deciding to sing on fewer tracks. O'Hagan also decided to mostly steer away from electronic sounds in favor of acoustic ones.

== Critical reception ==
Professional ratings
Review scores
Source	Rating
AllMusic	3/5 stars
Dayton Daily News	A
The Encyclopedia of Popular Music	3/5 stars
Orange County Register	B+
Pitchfork	5.8/10

Salon wrote that "the album's crystalline production and understated mid-tempo gait make it a near Adult Contemporary exercise in musical pleasantry, but the studied sweep of its craftsmanship clearly has other, more ambitious designs." The Birmingham Post thought that "if there's a chink in the Lamas' armour it's O'Hagan's fragile, insubstantial vocals which frequently fail to do justice to his elaborate Brian Wilsonesque arrangements." The Orange County Register stated that the "recycling is so beguiling."

The Herald opined that, "in 'Cut The Dummy Loose', the band may have recorded the theme for a kids' TV show so weird that only David Lynch could film it." The Guardian concluded that "the chief problem with this electroid whimsy, however, isn't that it doesn't come from the heart; it's that it doesn't make any discernible attempt to reach it." The Chicago Tribune determined that Snowbug "plays like a batch of singles instead of a suite, making it not only a perfect introduction, but a solid disc of individual, well-constructed ideas."

AllMusic wrote that, "at one point, there was charm and invention to his music, even if it was merely an homage, but now that it's become the patented High Llamas sound, it's clear that he's boxed himself into a corner, and worse, he doesn't seem that concerned about it."

== Track listing ==
No.	Title	Length
1.	"Bach Ze"
2.	"Harpers Romo"
3.	"Hoops Hooley"
4.	"Cookie Bay"
5.	"Triads"
6.	"The American Scene"
7.	"Go to Montecito"
8.	"Janet Jangle"
9.	"Amin"
10.	"Daltons Star"
11.	"Cotton to the Bell"
12.	"Green Coaster"
13.	"Cut the Dummy Loose"
