= Shimmies in Super 8 =

Compilation album by Huggy Bear, Darlin', Colm, Stereolab
- Released: April 1993
- Recorded: 1993
- Genre: Electronic; alternative rock; punk; indie rock
- Length: 7" vinyl: 21:07
- Label: Duophonic

Shimmies in Super 8 is a compilation released in the United Kingdom in April 1993 as a double pack. Both 7"s were housed in a cardboard folder sleeve in a plastic bag.

== History ==
This album features two of the four songs produced by Darlin', a French indie rock group composed of Thomas Bangalter, Guy-Manuel De Homem Christo (Daft Punk) and Laurent Brancowitz (Phoenix). Some copies include a Darlin' sticker, a Darlin' paper insert, and a Colm paper insert, designed by de Homem Christo. All copies were numbered (800 copies). A few light blue test pressings are also known to exist.

== Track listing ==
=== 7" white vinyl (DS45 – 05) ===
Side A

1. "Trafalgar Square" by Huggy Bear – 0:47
2. "Godziller" by Huggy Bear – 2:22
3. "More Music from Bells" by Huggy Bear – 0:49
4. "Snow White, Rose Red" by Huggy Bear – 1.13

Side B

1. "Cindy, So Loud" by Darlin' – 1:18
2. "Darlin'" by Darlin' – 2:38

=== 7" green vinyl (DS45 – 06) ===
Side C

1. "Soundtrack" by Colm – 4:40

Side D

1. "Revox!" by Stereolab – 4:05
