= The High Llamas =

Anglo-Irish avant-pop band

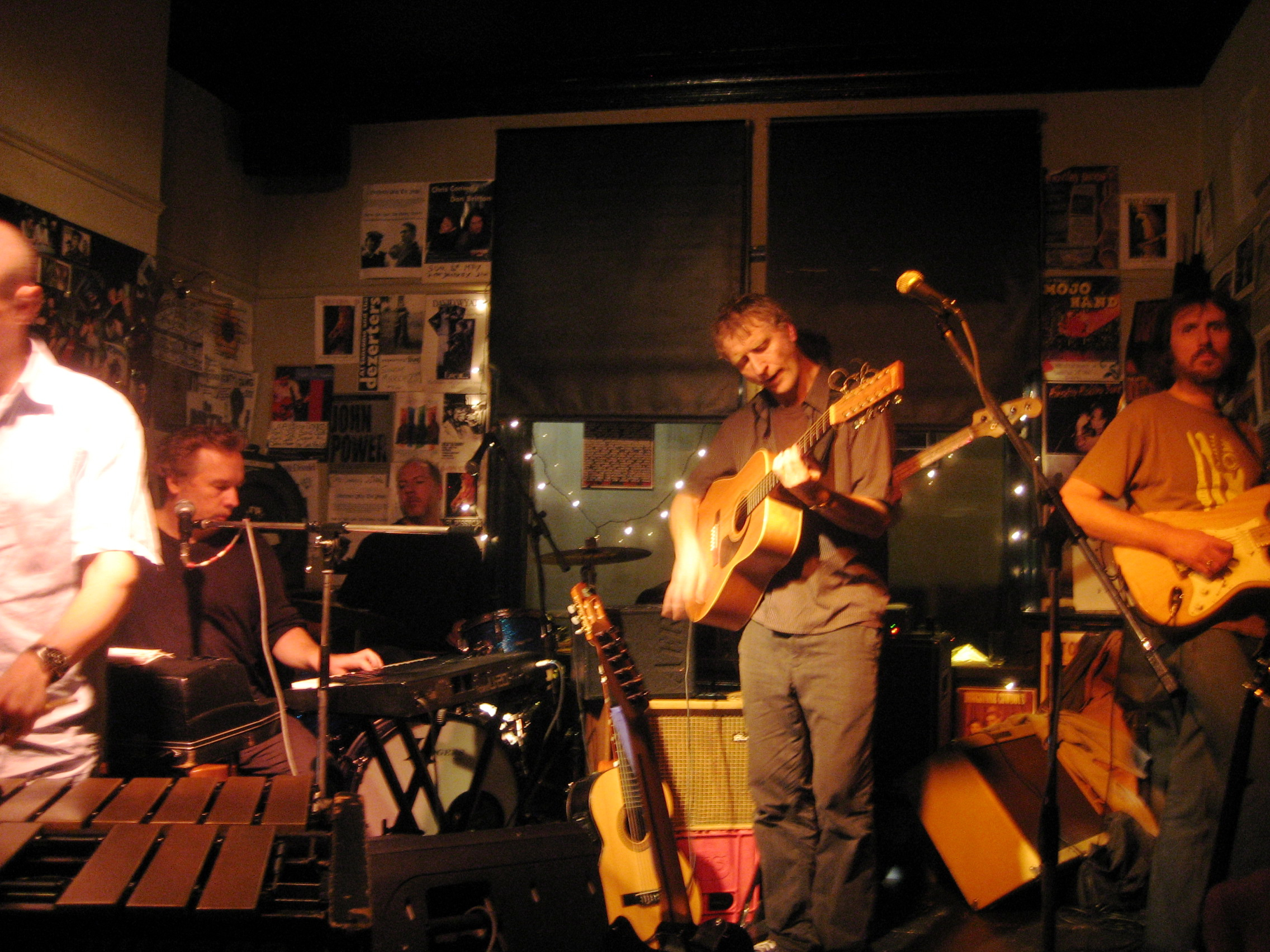
- The High Llamas performing in 2008. From left: Murcott (obscured), Holdaway, Allum, O'Hagan, Fell (obscured) and Aves.

Background information
- Origin: London, England
- Genres: Chamber pop; ork-pop; avant-pop; electronica
- Years active: c. 1991–present
- Labels: Target; Alpaca Park; V2; Duophonic; Drag City
- Spinoff of: Microdisney
- Members: Sean O'Hagan; Jon Fell; Rob Allum; Marcus Holdaway; Dominic Murcott; Pete Aves
- Past members: Anita Visser; John Bennett
- Website: highllamas.com

The High Llamas are an Anglo-Irish chamber pop band formed in London circa 1991. They were founded by singer-songwriter Sean O'Hagan, formerly of Microdisney, with drummer Rob Allum and ex-Microdisney bassist Jon Fell. O'Hagan has led the group since its formation. Their music is often compared to the Beach Boys, a band he acknowledges as an influence, although more prominent influences were drawn from bossa nova and European film soundtracks.

O'Hagan formed the High Llamas after the breakup of his group Microdisney. The band initially played in a more conventional acoustic indie pop style, but after he joined Stereolab as a keyboardist, he was inspired to revamp the High Llamas' style closer to the electronic and orchestral sound he preferred. Their second album, Gideon Gaye (1994), anticipated the mid 1990s easy-listening revivalist movement, and its follow-up Hawaii (1996) nearly led to a collaboration with the Beach Boys.

== History ==
=== Formation ===
In 1988, the Irish band Microdisney, led by Sean O'Hagan and Cathal Coughlan, broke up. To support himself, O'Hagan briefly worked as a rock music journalist, and in 1990, released a solo album titled High Llamas. The name came from a picture of a Victorian era hot-air balloon that he saw in a magazine. Around 1991 or 1992, the name was recycled for a new band formed by Sean O'Hagan, Marcus Holdaway, Jon Fell and Rob Allum. They could not afford to record a full album, and instead released an EP, titled Apricots. Under a French label, the EP was reissued with two additional tracks, which became the LP Santa Barbara.

At this point, the band's style was conventional compared to O'Hagan's own musical aspirations; he said he "was quite happy with what we were doing, [but] there wasn't really anything remarkable about it, and it wasn't really the kind of music that I enjoyed listening to". He held a frustration with the state of modern rock music, calling it "the most conformist, corporate thing out there"; he described himself as being "bored shitless by guitar rock ... From looking at the Beach Boys, I saw the Martin Denny thing [and] the early Yellow Magic Orchestra thing. These people were investigating harmonies in really interesting, nearly orchestral ways, but they were using subversive sounds to do it." The A.V. Club writer Noel Murray remarked that without the Beach Boys' 1968 album Friends, "the High Llamas probably wouldn't exist." In addition to these influences, he was drawn to "the Left Banke, Van Dyke Parks ... a lot of soundtrack music like John Barry, and electronic experimental music like Kraftwerk and Neu!."

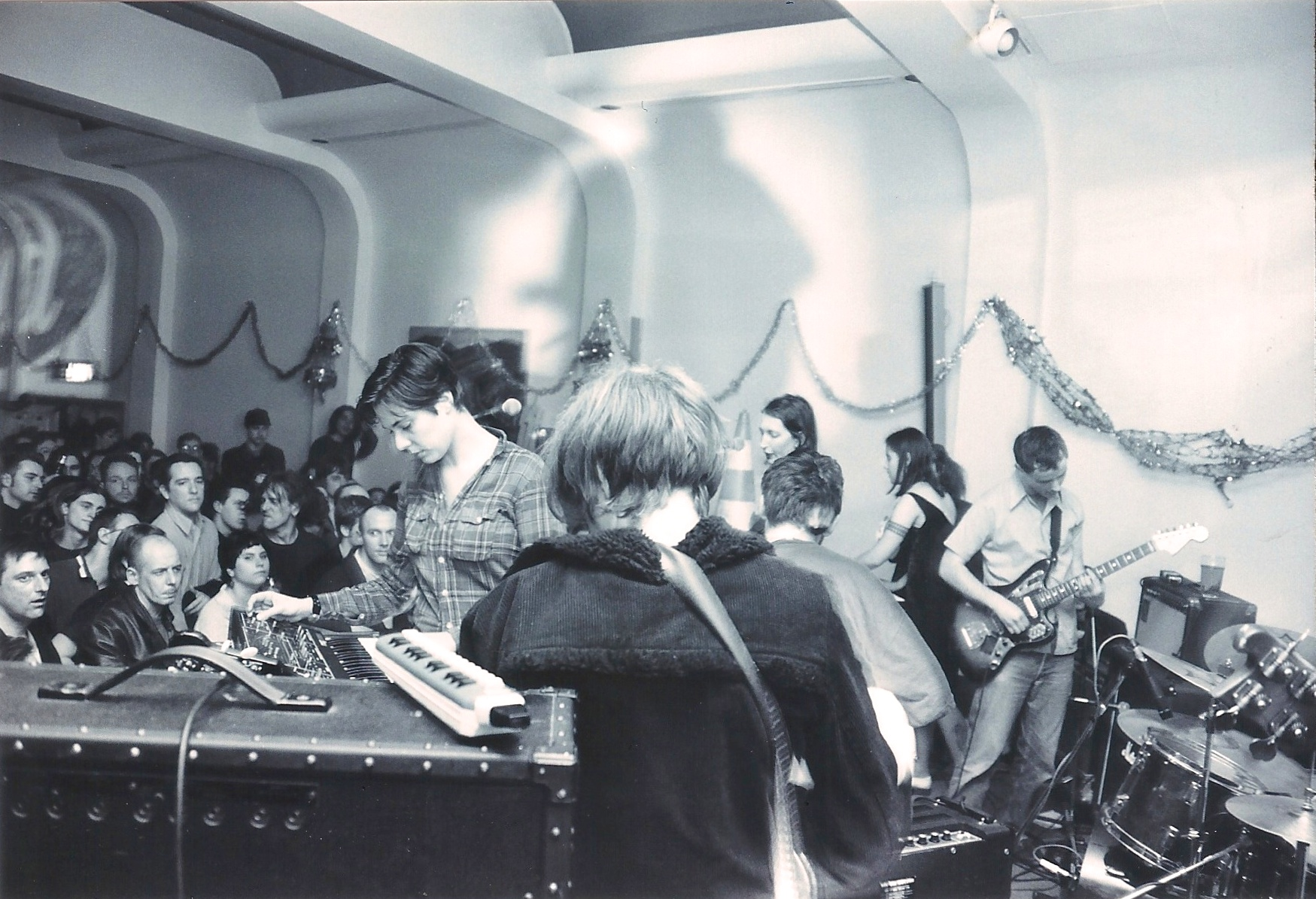
Stereolab performing in London, 1994 (O'Hagan not present)

After attending a Stereolab concert in the early 1990s, O'Hagan met the band's founders Tim Gane and Lætitia Sadier. He became their keyboardist initially as a temporary replacement, but O'Hagan was "allowed to make suggestions and the fun started." His first record appearance was on the EP Space Age Bachelor Pad Music (1993), and he remained a full-time member of the band until Mars Audiac Quintet (1994). Influenced by his time with Gane, O'Hagan decided to revamp his creative aspirations for the High Llamas. In a 1997 article, O'Hagan spoke of the Beach Boys' 1966 album Pet Sounds as "the beginning of the great pop experiment, [before] rock and roll got hold of the whole thing and stopped it," and intended his new band to carry on in a similar tradition. He continued to make guest appearances on later Stereolab releases. Visser departed the group and was replaced by guitarist John Bennett.

=== Gideon Gaye–Snowbug ===
In 1994, the High Llamas released Gideon Gaye, an album that reached 94 on the UK Albums Chart for a one-week stay. It was recorded with a £4000 budget in the span of a few months, and anticipated the mid 1990s easy-listening fad. The album received press coverage from magazines such as Q, Mojo and NME, but only received substantial sales and acclaim after being rereleased a year later. It was first reissued on the band's Alpaca Parks imprint, then by Delmore Recordings in the United States, and once more by the major label Epic Records. British music journalists praised Gideon Gaye, but AllMusic critic Richie Unterberger stated that the album was released "almost as an afterthought [in the US], with virtually no fanfare." Also in 1994, the High Llamas accompanied Arthur Lee, co-founder of the 1960s band Love, as his backing band for a brief concert tour.

Although the shorthand description of the High Llamas usually involves phrases like "shameless Brian Wilson imitators," that's never really been the case. Even on their most overtly Pet Sounds-influenced album, 1994's Gideon Gaye, other influences, such as Brazilian bossa nova and European film soundtracks, are obvious.

— Stewart Mason, AllMusic

Gideon Gaye was well-received from within the record industry, and it became a commonly recommended album among British A&R label representatives. The band were soon tagged as part of the nascent "ork-pop" movement, described in a 1996 Billboard piece as "a new breed of popsmiths going back to such inspirations as Brian Wilson, Burt Bacharach, and Phil Spector in the quest for building the perfect orchestrated pop masterpiece." O'Hagan responded to the Beach Boys comparisons that the album had drawn: "[Wilson] has been the biggest influence in my career to date. I was always shy [about] how much I liked him, but this time I decided to be blatant about it." He was also hesitant to be associated with the ork-pop movement, saying that the group's "music is a hybrid of stuff from the last 50, 20 or 30 years ... It's definitely about making music for tomorrow."

O'Hagan recalled that "we had everybody knocking the door down saying, 'here take the money and make the [next] record.'" The follow-up to Gideon Gaye, Hawaii (1996), was released on Alpaca Park, and reached number 62 in the UK, again for a one-week stay. He described the work as a fusion between the music of the "post mid-European Stockhausen era" and the "really screwed up West Coast American sort of music, of the Wrecking Crew variety". It incorporated more electronic sounds than Gideon Gaye, while its lyrics loosely address themes of "nomadism, nostalgia, film and musical theatre, and the effects of colonialism". In the US, the album was issued with a 40-minute bonus CD containing material that was previously unreleased in that region. Dominic Murcott then joined the group on vibraphone and marimba.

The High Llamas' American and British fanbase continued to grow. Cold and Bouncy (1998) pushed the band further into electronics. According to O'Hagan, it was named for electronica's "paradoxical" combination of "chill" or digital sounds and "boisterous" rhythms. It was accompanied by Lollo Rosso (1998), a remix album for Cold and Bouncy featuring remixes contributed by indie electronic musicians such as Mouse on Mars, Cornelius, Schneider TM, Jim O'Rourke, Kid Loco, Stock, Hausen & Walkman, and the High Llamas themselves. Snowbug (1999) featured Stereolab vocalists Lætitia Sadier and Mary Hansen. The album was met with poor sales, and was their last before departing V2 Records. A two-disc compilation, Retrospective, Rarities & Instrumentals (2003), collected tracks from their main discography up to this point. Additionally, it included rarities that had been released as B-sides or bonus tracks on Japanese and American editions of their albums, while one song, "Vampo Brazil", was a previously unreleased outtake from the Cold and Bouncy sessions.

=== 2000s–present ===
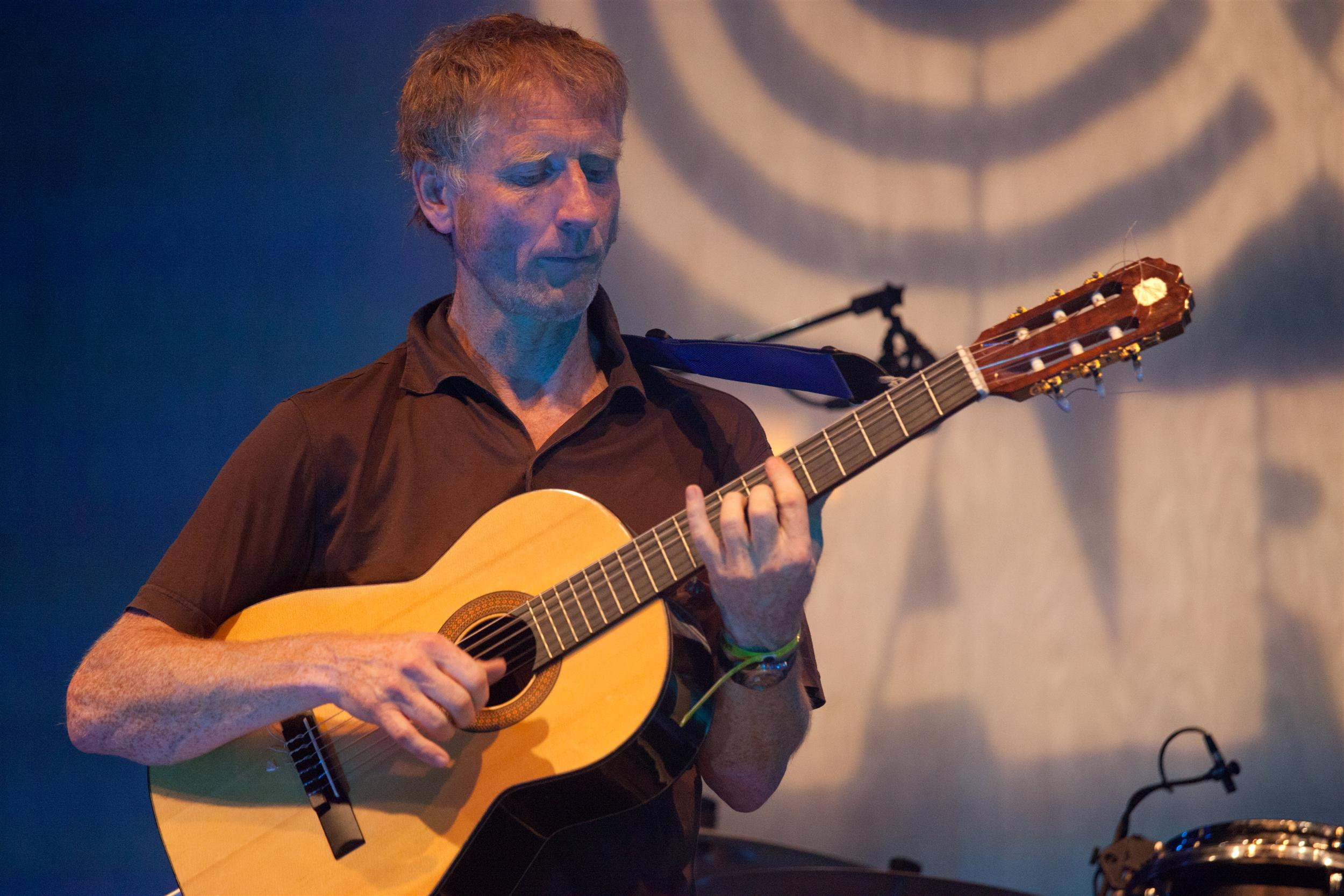
O'Hagan performing with the High Llamas in Spain, 2011

The High Llamas started recording for the Duophonic and Drag City record labels with Buzzle Bee (2000), which saw the band experimenting more with their sound, while Beet, Maize & Corn (2003) eschewed electric guitars and synthesizers in favor of string and brass arrangements. The latter marked the arrival of an additional member, Pete Aves, on guitars and banjo. Unterberger referred to Beet, Maize & Corn as "a high achievement for the Llamas with both critics and fans." In The Rough Guide to Rock (2003), music critic Nig Hodgkins commented that despite "adventurous breakthroughs by previously obscure American bands such as Mercury Rev and the Flaming Lips," the High Llamas failed to attract a comparative following and were seen as "a little too esoteric and experimental to threaten a mainstream that had once warmed to the strong melodies of Gideon Gaye."

The band does not make a living, but my arrangements and collaborations just about do. ... So an unmarketable band does have consequences. Tours have to be underwritten and those days are gone I'm afraid. ... We never get to the U.S. now because it’s too expensive.

— Sean O'Hagan, 2016

Can Cladders (2007) received generally favourable reviews. Pitchfork reviewer Eric Harvey wrote that the album "emerge[d] as the most enjoyable High Llamas record in over a decade. ... with a bounce and sway nearly absent from its largely rhythmless predecessor." Another four years went by until their next release, Talahomi Way (2011), described by O'Hagan as a "spring album". He said that the band's slowed output was due to low finances, and that he could only sustain a career in music through arrangement commissions. He could not afford commercial studios and recorded in improvised spaces "as much as possible, which allowed the budget to go on strings and brass. But I also wanted to create more space on the records. I was tired of density." In 2013, the group contributed a song, "Living on a Farm", to an episode of the children's television programme Yo! Gabba Gabba.

In 2014, the High Llamas premiered a theatrical play, Here Come the Rattling Trees, at the Tristan Bates Theatre in London's Covent Garden. Pitchfork critic Robert Ham summarized the plot as "extended anecdotes [used] to comment on the rapid changes happening in London, particularly in Peckham, a region in the southeastern part of the city where O'Hagan has lived for over 20 years." The play originally featured a cast of actors and actresses, but when a studio album adaptation was released in 2016, the record only featured instrumental performances. O'Hagan explained that this was because the label felt that its promotion "would be difficult as the record would appear to be from a different medium."

In 2019, Drag City released O'Hagan's second solo album, Radum Calls, Radum Calls. During an interview to promote the record, he commented that the High Llamas were not defunct and that he was attempting to secure the rights to the band's work from Universal Music Group, "who are extremely reluctant to do anything with our catalog, and I’ve really been wanting to get them remastered and pressed on vinyl, and maybe do an expanded series like Stereolab have done. If we can get that to happen, we’ll tour. ... Then we might use that as an opportunity to officially retire—it would be a great way to close that book, don’t you think?"

In March 2024, a new album, Hey Panda, was released under the High Llamas banner. The album contains elements of R&B and trap music, and features vocal contributions from singer Rae Morris and O'Hagan's daughter Livvy.

== Members ==
Current

- Sean O'Hagan – lead vocals, keyboards, guitar
- John Fell – bass
- Rob Allum – drums
- Marcus Holdaway – cello, keyboards
- Dominic Murcott – vibraphone, marimba
- Pete Aves – guitar

Former

- Anita Visser – vocals, guitar
- John Bennett – guitar

== Discography ==
The High Llamas discography
- Studio albums: 10
- Compilation albums: 1
- Remixes: 1

Studio albums

Title	Release
Santa Barbara	Released: 1992; Label: JBM
Gideon Gaye	Released: 1994; Label: Target
Hawaii	Released: 1996; Label: Alpaca Park
Cold and Bouncy	Released: 1998; Label: V2
Snowbug	Released: 1999; Label: V2
Buzzle Bee	Released: 2000; Label: Duophonic
Beet, Maize & Corn	Released: 2003; Label: Drag City
Can Cladders	Released: 2007; Label: Drag City
Talahomi Way	Released: 2011; Label: Drag City
Here Come the Rattling Trees	Released: 2016; Label: Drag City
Hey Panda	Released: 29 March 2024; Label: Drag City

Compilation

Title	Release
Retrospective, Rarities and Instrumentals	Released: 2003; Label: V2

Remix EP

Title	Release
Lollo Rosso	Released: 1998; Label: V2
