= Joe Smith (music industry executive) =

American music industry executive (1928–2019)

- Born: January 26, 1928; Boston, Massachusetts, U.S.
- Died: December 2, 2019 (aged 91); Los Angeles, California, U.S.
- Education: Yale University
- Occupation: Music industry executive

Joseph Benjamin Smith (January 26, 1928 – December 2, 2019) was an American music industry executive.

== Early life ==
Smith was born in Boston, Massachusetts, and raised in Chelsea, Massachusetts. His parents were Phil and Lil Smith. Smith joined the United States Army after graduating high school in 1945 and served with the occupation forces in Okinawa.

== Career ==
Smith attended Yale University. After graduation, he became a sportscaster and later a DJ at WMEX and WBZ in Boston. Smith was hired as national promotion manager at Warner Bros. in 1961 and later served as the label's general manager. He was named President of Warner Bros. in 1972. In 1975, he became chairman of Warner's sister company, Elektra/Asylum.

Smith briefly served as president of the National Academy of Recording Arts and Sciences in 1986. He became vice chairman and chief executive of Capitol-EMI that same year.

While at Capitol Records, Smith compiled 238 hours of recorded interviews with artists and executives. Excerpts from his recordings were included in his 1988 book Off the Record: An Oral History of Popular Music. In 2012, Smith donated these recordings to the Library of Congress.

== Death ==
Smith died December 2, 2019, at the age of 91.
