= Sean O'Hagan =

Irish singer-songwriter (born 1959)

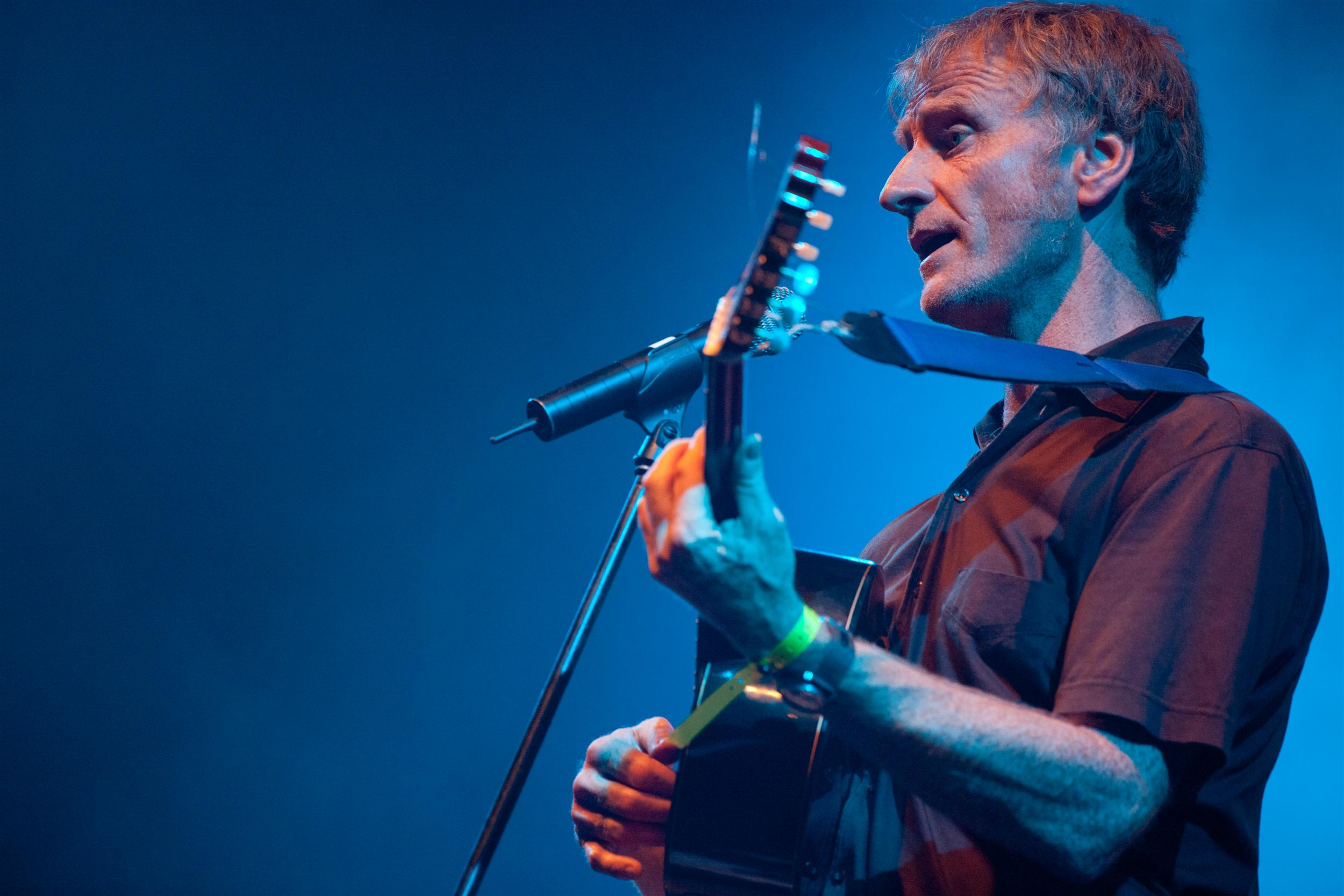
- O'Hagan performing in 2011

Background information
- Born: 1959 (age 66–67); Luton, England
- Genres: Pop; electronic
- Instruments: Vocals, synthesizers, guitar
- Years active: 1980–present

Sean O'Hagan (born 1959) is an Irish singer and songwriter who leads the avant-pop band the High Llamas, which he founded in 1992. He is also known for being one half of the songwriting duo (with Cathal Coughlan) in Microdisney and for his work during the early 1990s with the English-French band Stereolab.

== Life and career ==
O'Hagan was born in England to Irish parents, moving to Cork as a teenager.

He is a founding member of the Irish indie band Microdisney, alongside Cathal Coughlan; the band initially formed in Cork but was based in London from 1982 until their split in 1988.

He released a solo album titled High Llamas in 1990, which would become the name of a band he subsequently formed. The High Llamas were influenced by the Beach Boys, Ennio Morricone, Antonio Carlos Jobim and avant-garde electronica. He has also collaborated extensively with Stereolab, he was an official member from 1993 to 1994, and is credited as a guest musician on later releases.

In 1996, O'Hagan collaborated with Tim Gane of Stereolab as Turn On, releasing an album of the same name on Drag City Records. They also worked together on the soundtrack to the film La Vie d'Artiste.

On 27 November 2017, it was announced that O'Hagan and Coughlan would reform Microdisney for a one-off concert in the National Concert Hall, Dublin on 2 June 2018. The concert sold out, and was followed by gigs in Cork and London. Coughlan died in 2022.

=== Unrealised Beach Boys collaboration ===
In the mid-1990s, Brian Wilson was attempting to organize a comeback album with the Beach Boys and his collaborator Andy Paley. After Wilson's bandmate Bruce Johnston heard the High Llamas' 1996 album Hawaii, an unsuccessful attempt was made to instead coordinate a collaboration between O'Hagan and Wilson. Some of the songs that later appeared on the High Llamas' 1998 album Cold and Bouncy were then briefly under consideration to be recorded by the Beach Boys.

One of the reasons that the collaboration never happened, by O'Hagan's account, was interference from Wilson's wife Melinda and former wrestler Joe Thomas, who was ultimately chosen to produce Wilson's 1998 solo album, Imagination. O'Hagan, who thought Wilson's musical talents were best served at reclaiming his title as a "20th-century avant-garde pop genius", had voiced objections to Thomas' desire to instead break Wilson into the adult contemporary market. According to O'Hagan, he attended one meeting with Wilson and two with the Beach Boys, but Wilson's "camp" was unable to reach an agreement with the other Beach Boys. He said of Wilson in a 2001 interview,

I didn't go out of my way to meet Brian, and I wouldn't have wanted to. I'm happy enough to have been influenced by [him] [...] He's not mad, but [...] I asked him what sort of record he wanted to make and told him he could have strings and brass, and I was witness to him running around his house shouting "Too much!" and "You're blowing my mind!" over and over.

A post attributed to Wilson on his website wrote that O'Hagan was "a real sweet guy, but I didn't think I needed him to show me how to do the things I had already done 30 years earlier". Johnston surmised that "Brian was a little intimidated by Sean, in the same way that Gershwin may have been intimidated by Oscar Levant."

== Discography ==
Studio albums and soundtracks

- High Llamas (1990)
- La Vie d'artiste (2007) (with Tim Gane)
- The Musical Paintings Volume 1 (2008) (with Jean Pierre Muller)
- Copacabana (2010) (with Tim Gane)
- Radum Calls, Radum Calls (2019)
- Hey Panda (2024)

Stereolab appearances

- Space Age Bachelor Pad Music (1993)
- Ping Pong (1994)
- Mars Audiac Quintet (1994)
- Fluorescences (1996)
- Cybele's Reverie (1996)
- Emperor Tomato Ketchup (1996)
- Miss Modular (1997)
- Dots and Loops (1997)
- The Free Design (1999)
- The First of the Microbe Hunters (2000)
- Sound-Dust (2000)
- Chemical Chords (2007)
- Not Music (2010)

Other appearances

- Cornelius – Fantasma (1998)
- Cornelius – FM (1999)
- The Heavy Blinkers – Health (2013)
