= ABC Music (album) =

ABC Music: The Radio 1 Sessions

Compilation album by Stereolab
- Released: 8 October 2002
- Recorded: 30 July 1991 – 16 August 2001
- Genres: Post-rock; experimental rock; indie pop
- Length: 137:29
- Labels: Koch (US); Strange Fruit (UK)

Stereolab chronology
Sound-Dust (2001)	ABC Music: The Radio 1 Sessions (2002)	Instant 0 in the Universe (2003)

Professional ratings
Review scores
Source	Rating
AllMusic	4/5 stars
Pitchfork	8.0/10
Rolling Stone	favourable

ABC Music: The Radio 1 Sessions, released in October 2002, is a compilation by post-rock band Stereolab of BBC Radio 1 sessions recorded from July 1991 to August 2001. It includes appearances in John Peel and Mark Radcliffe's shows and it is a CD-only release.

== Track listing ==
=== CD 1 ===
1. "Super-Electric" – 4:48 (Peel, 30/7/1991)
2. "Changer" – 4:11
3. "Doubt" – 2:41
4. "Difficult Fourth Title" – 4:45
5. "Laissez Faire" – 3:57 (Peel, 28/6/1992)
6. "Revox" – 3:12
7. "Peng 33" – 2:57
8. "John Cage Bubblegum" – 2:56
9. "Wow and Flutter" – 2:54 (Peel, 28/9/1993)
10. "Anemie" – 4:41
11. "Moogie Wonderland" – 2:34
12. "Heavy Denim" – 3:09
13. "French Disko" – 3:12 (Radcliffe, 13/12/1993)
14. "Wow and Flutter" – 2:56
15. "Golden Ball" – 5:45
16. "Lo Boob Oscillator" – 4:33
17. "Check and Double Check" – 2:51 (Radcliffe, 22/11/1994)
18. "Working Title (The Pram Song)" – 4:13

"Difficult Fourth Title" is the song eventually named "Contact" (from Super-Electric and then Switched On). "Working Title (The Pram Song)" is an early version of "Seeperbold" from Aluminum Tunes.

=== CD 2 ===
1. "International Colouring Contest" – 3:42
2. "Anamorphose" – 7:27
3. "Metronomic Underground" – 10:14 (Peel, 15/2/1996)
4. "Brigitte" – 5:50
5. "Spinal Column" – 3:31
6. "Tomorrow Is Already Here" – 4:43
7. "Les Yper-Sound" – 6:00 (Evening Session, 26/2/1996)
8. "Heavenly Van Halen" – 3:09
9. "Cybele's Reverie" – 3:59
10. "Slow Fast Hazel" – 4:07
11. "Nothing to Do with Me" – 4:01 (Peel, 19/9/2001)
12. "Double Rocker" – 5:33
13. "Baby Lulu" – 5:03
14. "Naught More Terrific Than Man" – 3:56

"Heavenly Van Halen" is an early version of "Pinball" from the Fluorescences EP.
