= Cobra and Phases Group Play Voltage in the Milky Night =

Studio album by Stereolab
- Released: 21 September 1999
- Recorded: February 1998 – February 1999
- Studios: Wolf (London); Blackwing (London)
- Genres: Art pop; experimental pop; post-rock; psychedelic pop
- Length: 75:37
- Languages: English; French
- Labels: Duophonic; Elektra
- Producers: John McEntire; Jim O'Rourke; Stereolab; Fulton Dingley

Stereolab chronology
The Free Design (1999)	Cobra and Phases Group Play Voltage in the Milky Night (1999)	The First of the Microbe Hunters (2000)

Singles from Cobra and Phases Group Play Voltage in the Milky Night
- 1. "The Free Design" Released: 6 September 1999; 2. "Come and Play in the Milky Night" Released: 5 September 2019

Cobra and Phases Group Play Voltage in the Milky Night is the sixth studio album by English-French rock band Stereolab. It was released on 21 September 1999 and was issued by Duophonic Records and Elektra Records. The album was largely co-produced by Stereolab, John McEntire, and Jim O'Rourke.

== Recording ==
Stereolab produced Cobra and Phases Group Play Voltage in the Milky Night with John McEntire, who had co-produced the band's previous two studio albums Emperor Tomato Ketchup (1996) and Dots and Loops (1997), and Jim O'Rourke. Assisted by McEntire and O'Rourke, Stereolab recorded the bulk of Cobra and Phases Group between November 1998 and February 1999, at Wolf Studios in London. As band members Tim Gane and Lætitia Sadier were occupied with raising their infant son at the time, Stereolab opted to record in London instead of Chicago, where McEntire and O'Rourke were typically based. The only material on the album that does not date to these sessions is one section of the song "Italian Shoes Continuum"; this section was produced by Stereolab and Fulton Dingley and recorded in February 1998 at Blackwing Studios in London.

== Release ==
Cobra and Phases Group was released on 21 September 1999 in the United States by Elektra Records, and on 27 September 1999 in the United Kingdom by Duophonic Records. The track "The Free Design" was previously released on 6 September 1999; it was issued as a single (on 7" vinyl) and as an EP (on CD and 12" vinyl).

A remastered and expanded edition of Cobra and Phases Group was released by Duophonic and Warp on 13 September 2019. Coinciding with the re-release, "Come and Play in the Milky Night" was issued as a digital single on 5 September 2019.

== Critical reception and legacy ==
Professional ratings
Review scores
Source	Rating
AllMusic	4/5 stars
Alternative Press	4/5
Entertainment Weekly	B+
Exclaim!	8/10
Pitchfork	3.4/10
Q	3/5 stars
Rolling Stone	2.5/5 stars
Spin	6/10
Uncut	6/10
USA Today	3/4 stars

Cobra and Phases Group was released to middling reviews from music critics. Pitchfork's Brent DiCrescenzo wrote that Stereolab's "socialist cocktail jazz schtick" had become predictable and "soulless", and that despite the album's eclectic nature, "it all sounds exactly the same." NME writer Johnny Cigarettes stated that the music was reminiscent of "bad jazz and progressive rock" and scathingly accused Stereolab of "borrowing credibility by indulgently showing off their stylistic dexterity, thinking that odd time signatures and weird sounds are clever in their own right, [and] being deliberately obscure and unlistenable". James Hunter of Rolling Stone dismissed the first five songs as uneventful and felt that only from "Infinity Girl" onward does the album capture the band's "fashionable post-rock charm". Barry Walters of Spin found the more drone-oriented songs tepid but noted that "the melodic bits are dreamier than ever", concluding that the album would benefit from "ruthless home-listener editing".

Among more positive appraisals, Alternative Press remarked that "few bands make sweetly psychedelic pop as enduring as [Stereolab] do." USA Today critic Edna Gundersen said that although "ponderous drones such as 'Blue Milk' border on grating, the aggressively unorthodox band lapses into coherent melodies as effortlessly as Burt Bacharach." Elisabeth Vincentelli of Entertainment Weekly wrote that the album "takes time to work its charm, but it's well worth the effort."

In a retrospective review for AllMusic, Tim Sendra stated that while "difficult at times, Cobra is Stereolab at their near best", effectively balancing the band's experimental and pop sensibilities. Reviewing the album in 2019 for Uncut, Louis Pattison commented that in hindsight, "its charms are more evident". The same year, Tim Gane cited Cobra and Phases Group and its follow-up Sound-Dust (2001) as his favourite Stereolab albums in an interview with The Guardian: "I like things that are sprawling and not identified really easily, not easy to digest but there's a lot of possibilities in them."

== Track listing ==
All tracks are written by Tim Gane and Lætitia Sadier.

No.	Title	Length
1.	"Fuses"	3:40
2.	"People Do It All the Time"	3:42
3.	"The Free Design"	3:47
4.	"Blips, Drips and Strips"	4:28
5.	"Italian Shoes Continuum"	4:36
6.	"Infinity Girl"	3:56
7.	"The Spiracles"	3:40
8.	"Op Hop Detonation"	3:32
9.	"Puncture in the Radax Permutation"	5:48
10.	"Velvet Water"	4:24
11.	"Blue Milk"	11:29
12.	"Caleidoscopic Gaze"	8:09
13.	"Strobo Acceleration"	3:55
14.	"The Emergency Kisses"	5:53
15.	"Come and Play in the Milky Night"	4:38
Total length:		75:37

- On the expanded edition, "Fuses" is extended to 4:00, "Blips, Drips and Strips" is extended to 4:53, and "Blue Milk" is extended to 16:57.

Japanese edition bonus track
No.	Title	Length
16.	"Galaxidion"	3:15
Total length:		78:52

Limited edition bonus disc
No.	Title	Length
1.	"Escape Pod (From the World of Medical Observations)"	3:55
2.	"With Friends Like These"	5:51
3.	"Les Aimes des memes"	5:54
Total length:		15:40

2019 expanded edition bonus disc
No.	Title	Length
1.	"Galaxidion"	3:17
2.	"With Friends Like These Pt. 2"	2:53
3.	"Backwards Shug"	3:58
4.	"Continuum" (unreleased original version)	2:05
5.	"Continuum Vocodered" (unreleased)	1:13
6.	"People Do It All the Time" (demo)	1:54
7.	"Op Hop Detonation" (demo)	0:59
8.	"The Spiracles" (demo)	1:41
9.	"Latin Cobra Coda" (demo)	0:47
10.	"Infinity Girl" (demo)	2:35
11.	"Blips, Drips & Strips" (demo)	2:35
12.	"Blue Milk" (demo)	3:38
13.	"Italian Shoes Continuum" (demo)	2:17
14.	"Come and Play in the Milky Night" (demo)	2:01
15.	"Strobo Acceleration" (demo)	2:21
16.	"Caleidoscopic Gaze" (demo)	2:07
17.	"Galaxidion" (demo)	1:47
Total length:		38:08

== Personnel ==
Credits are adapted from the album's liner notes.

Stereolab

- Stereolab – vocals, guitar, organ, electronics, drums, percussion, bass, electric harpsichord, clavinet, Wurlitzer piano, tack piano
  - Tim Gane
  - Lætitia Sadier
  - Mary Hansen
  - Morgane Lhote
  - Andy Ramsay

Additional musicians

- Mark Bassey – brass
- Colin Crawley – brass
- Sophie Harris – strings
- William Hawkes – strings
- Kev Hopper – saw on "Puncture in the Radax Permutation" and "Caleidoscopic Gaze"
- Simon Johns – bass
- Rob Mazurek – cornet on "Fuses", "People Do It All the Time", "Infinity Girl", "Op Hop Detonation", and "Strobo Acceleration"
- John McEntire – vibraphone, keyboards, drums
- Dominic Murcott – vibraphone and marimba on "The Spiracles", "Puncture in the Radax Permutation", "Caleidoscopic Gaze", and "The Emergency Kisses"
- Jacqueline Norrie – strings
- Sean O'Hagan – organ, electric harpsichord, clavinet, bass, acoustic guitar, tack piano, brass arrangements
- Jim O'Rourke – bass, guitar, keyboards, percussion, string arrangements
- Andy Robinson – brass
- Steve Waterman – brass
- Brian G. Wright – strings

Production

- Fulton Dingley – production, mixing, and recording on "Italian Shoes Continuum"
- John McEntire – production, mixing, recording
- Jim O'Rourke – production, mixing, recording
- Steve Rooke – mastering
- Stereolab (credited as "The Groop") – production

Design

- House – design

== Charts ==
Chart (1999–2019)	Peak position
Scottish Albums (Official Charts)	46
UK Albums (Official Charts)	92
UK Dance Albums (OCC)	5
UK Independent Albums (Official Charts)	12
US Billboard 200	154
US Heatseekers Albums (Billboard)	8
