= Instant Holograms on Metal Film =

Studio album by Stereolab
- Released: 23 May 2025
- Studio: Press Play (London)
- Length: 59:36
- Labels: Duophonic UHF; Warp

Stereolab chronology
| Pulse of the Early Brain (2022) | Instant Holograms on Metal Film (2025) |

Singles from Instant Holograms on Metal Film
- 1. "Aerial Troubles" Released: 8 April 2025; 2. "Melodie Is a Wound" Released: 29 April 2025; 3. "Transmuted Matter" Released: 20 May 2025

Instant Holograms on Metal Film is the eleventh studio album by English-French rock band Stereolab. It was released on 23 May 2025 through Duophonic UHF Disks and Warp Records. It marked their first studio album in nearly 15 years, following Not Music (2010).

== Background and release ==
Stereolab started teasing the record in early April 2025, via a wordsearch image sent to subscribers of their Lab Report newsletter as well as a series of Instagram posts. On 2 April, 16 years to the day that the group announced their indefinite hiatus, fans received a package called "unsolicited Stereolab material" comprising the lead single "Aerial Troubles" alongside the instrumental. Additionally, posters of the band's name appeared in major cities around the world. Stereolab announced their eleventh studio album on 8 April, which marks their return after a 15 year wait. "Aerial Troubles", a song that features their "signature otherworldly, radiant groove", received an official release the same day alongside a "retro" music video directed by Laurent Askienazy.

Instant Holograms on Metal Film includes 13 tracks, all of which were written by Tim Gane and Lætitia Sadier and performed by the duo alongside Andy Ramsay, Joe Watson and Xavi Muñoz of the group's 2025 touring lineup. It features contributions by Cooper Crain and Rob Frye of Bitchin Bajas, Ben LaMar Gay of International Anthem, Ric Elsworth, Holger Zapf of Cavern of Anti-Matter, Marie Merlet and Molly Hansen Read. The album was released as a double vinyl LP, available in standard and coloured variants as well as on CD. Instant Holograms on Metal Film was supported by a tour through Europe, North America and the United Kingdom from May to December 2025.

== Critical reception ==
Professional ratings
Aggregate scores
| Source | Rating |
|---|---|
| AnyDecentMusic? | 8.0/10 |
| Metacritic | 84/100 |
Review scores
| Source | Rating |
| AllMusic | 4.5/5 stars |
| The Arts Desk | 4/5 stars |
| Exclaim! | 8/10 |
| The Guardian | 4/5 stars |
| The Line of Best Fit | 8/10 |
| Mojo | 4/5 stars |
| MusicOMH | 4.5/5 stars |
| Pitchfork | 7.8/10 |
| Uncut | 4.5/5 stars |
| Under the Radar | 9/10 |

According to the review aggregator Metacritic, Instant Holograms on Metal Film received "universal acclaim" based on a weighted average score of 84 out of 100 from 15 critic scores.

== Track listing ==
All tracks are written by Tim Gane and Lætitia Sadier, except "Mystical Plosives" and "Electrified Teenybop!" by Gane.

Instant Holograms on Metal Film track listing
| No. | Title | Length |
|---|---|---|
| 1. | "Mystical Plosives" | 0:55 |
| 2. | "Aerial Troubles" | 3:20 |
| 3. | "Melodie Is a Wound" | 7:37 |
| 4. | "Immortal Hands" | 6:25 |
| 5. | "Vermona F Transistor" | 4:37 |
| 6. | "La Coeur et La Force" | 4:21 |
| 7. | "Electrified Teenybop!" | 4:16 |
| 8. | "Transmuted Matter" | 4:16 |
| 9. | "Esemplastic Creeping Eruption" | 6:04 |
| 10. | "If You Remember I Forgot How to Dream Pt. 1" | 3:41 |
| 11. | "Flashes from Everywhere" | 5:35 |
| 12. | "Colour Television" | 5:33 |
| 13. | "If You Remember I Forgot How to Dream Pt. 2" | 2:56 |
| Total length: | | 59:36 |

== Personnel ==
Credits adapted from the album's liner notes.

=== Stereolab ===
- Andy Ramsay – drums, EMS synthesizer, Wasp, Roland Jupiter-4, Electro-Harmonix DRM15, Ace Tone, Soundmaster Latin Percussion, Watford Electronics, Vox drum machine, Rainger Snare Trap, TR-606, Boss DR-110, mixing
- Lætitia Sadier – vocals, keyboards, synthesizer, trombone, guitar, mixing
- Joe Watson – Solina Strings, Vox Jaguar, Hohner Symphonic 30N, RMI 368X Electrapiano, Roland System-100M, Korg MS-20, Wurlitzer piano, Fender Rhodes, Yamaha Portatone, EMS Synthi, acoustic piano, Moog Matriarch, Prophet-5, Hohner Clavinet, modular synthesizer, Wasp, Mellotron, backing vocals, mixing
- Xavi Muñoz – Fender Bass VI, Fender Precision Bass, backing vocals, mixing
- Timothy Gane – electric guitar, 12-string guitar, Vermona organ, Roland SH5, mixing

=== Additional contributors ===
- Cooper Crain – Cwejman SM-1, Korg MS-20, TR-606, Roland Jupiter-4, Oberheim SEM, Roland JP-8000, Mellotron, Moog Micromoog, TR-707, general filtering, recording, engineering, mixing
- Rob Frye – saxophone, woodwinds, clarinets, flutes, bass clarinet, electronics
- Ben LaMar Gay – cornet (tracks 4, 5, 10)
- Ric Elsworth – percussion, hand drums, marimba, vibraphone, glockenspiel
- Holger Zapf – additional electronics (4); ancient dabbling, treatments (7)
- Marie Merlet – backing vocals
- Molly Read – special guest backing vocals (5)
- Bo Kondren – mastering
- Vanina Schmitt – sleeve design

== Charts ==
Chart performance for Instant Holograms on Metal Film
| Chart (2025) | Peak position |
|---|---|
| Australian Vinyl Albums (ARIA) | 7 |
| Belgian Albums (Ultratop Flanders) | 75 |
| Belgian Albums (Ultratop Wallonia) | 127 |
| German Albums (Offizielle Top 100) | 41 |
| Scottish Albums (Official Charts) | 4 |
| UK Albums (Official Charts) | 29 |
| UK Independent Albums (Official Charts) | 7 |
