= The First of the Microbe Hunters =

EP by Stereolab
- Released: 16 May 2000
- Recorded: March 1997, January 2000
- Studios: Blackwing, London; Idful Music Corporation, Chicago, Illinois
- Length: 39:47
- Labels: Duophonic; Elektra
- Producers: Stereolab; Fulton Dingley; John McEntire

Stereolab chronology
Cobra and Phases Group Play Voltage in the Milky Night (1999)	The First of the Microbe Hunters (2000)	Captain Easychord (2001)

The First of the Microbe Hunters is the fifth EP by English-French rock band Stereolab. It was released on 16 May 2000 in the United Kingdom by Duophonic Records and in the United States by Elektra Records. Its title makes reference to the book Microbe Hunters by Paul de Kruif, in which the first chapter is dedicated to Dutch scientist Anton van Leeuwenhoek, named "the first of the microbe hunters". Its tracks were re-released in the band's 2021 compilation Electrically Possessed.

== Reception ==
Professional ratings
Aggregate scores
Source	Rating
Metacritic	59/100
Review scores
Source	Rating
AllMusic	2/5 stars
The Encyclopedia of Popular Music	3/5 stars
NME	3.5/5 stars
Pitchfork	6.8/10

The First of the Microbe Hunters was met with mixed reviews from music critics. At Metacritic, which assigns a normalized rating out of 100 to reviews from mainstream publications, the album received an average score of 59, based on eight reviews.

== Track listing ==
All tracks are written by Lætitia Sadier and Tim Gane, except where noted.

No.	Title	Writer(s)	Length
1.	"Outer Bongolia"	Sean O'Hagan, Gane, Andy Ramsay	9:29
2.	"Intervals"		4:38
3.	"Barock-Plastik"		3:17
4.	"Nomus Et Phusis"		4:23
5.	"I Feel the Air (Of Another Planet)"		8:12
6.	"Household Names"		3:43
7.	"Retrograde Mirror Form"		6:45
Total length:			39:47

== Personnel ==
Credits are adapted from the album's liner notes.

Stereolab

- Stereolab – all instruments, mixing
  - Lætitia Sadier
  - Tim Gane
  - Mary Hansen
  - Simon Johns
  - Morgane Lhote
  - Andy Ramsay
- Fulton Dingley – recording, mixing
- House – sleeve design
- John McEntire – recording and mixing (track 5)
- Sean O'Hagan – additional instruments
