= Diamond Violence =

Studio album by Marker Starling
- Released: 2023
- Genre: Soft rock, soul, funk, indie pop
- Label: Tin Angel

Marker Starling chronology
High January (2020)	Diamond Violence (2023)

Diamond Violence is the tenth album by Canadian music artist Marker Starling (Chris A. Cummings), released in early 2023. A fusion of funk, soul and indie pop, it was produced by Zack G., who worked on previous projects by Cummings, as well as with Ben Gunning. Featured on the album is vocal work by Dorothea Paas and trombone by the legendary Arthur Russell collaborator Peter Zummo.

== Reviews ==
Bill Pearis of the Brooklyn Vegan wrote in his review:

Chris A Cummings sings over the silkiest of disco backing layered with sweet harmonies, synthy strings, Chic-esque guitar and a groovy bassline, all while he notes "crumpled pages" are "piling up tenfold" and "failure counts just as much as every step forward." It's a grim portrait of an artist, but Cummings, as Marker Starling, specializes in just these kind of "melancholy party jams."

Music Tribune Tokyo wrote:

...it is worth noting that Cummings has created songs that value the gentle elements of his songwriting, summing up his career so far. In addition, Dorothea Pierce, who joined as a guest vocalist, performed breathtaking call-and-response twin vocals with Cummings to add a glamorous impression to the end of the album.

== Track listing ==
=== Side 1 ===
1. Diamond Violence
2. Out Of This Mess
3. End of Summer
4. Diehards

=== Side 2 ===
1. (Hope It Feels Like) Home
2. Experience
3. Okay To Need
4. Yet You Go On

== Personnel ==
- Arrangement [Rhythm], Bass – Matt McLaren (2)
- Arrangement [Rhythm], Drums – Jay Anderson (4)
- Arrangement [Rhythm], Guitar – Andrew Scott (5)
- Arrangement, Vocals, Written By, Organ, Electric Piano [Rhodes], Electric Piano [Wurlitzer], Electric Piano [Minimoog], Organ [Ace Tone Top-5], Piano – Chris A. Cummings
- Artwork By – Mason Dickerson
- Backing Vocals – Dorothea Paas
- Engineer – Christopher Sandes
- Layout – Jake Monroe
- Mastering – Noel Summerville
- Photography – Colin Medley
- Producer, Mixed By – Zack G.
- Trombone – Peter Zummo

Recorded At – Palace Sound / Mastered At – 3345 Mastering / Phonographic Copyright (p) – Tin Angel Records / Copyright (c) – Tin Angel Records
