= Low Fi =

EP by Stereolab
- Released: 28 September 1992
- Genre: Noise pop
- Length: 24:41
- Label: Too Pure
- Producer: Robbs; Stereolab

Stereolab chronology
Peng! (1992)	Low Fi (1992)	Switched On (1992)

Professional ratings
Review scores
Source	Rating
Allmusic	link
Pitchfork	8.1/10

Low Fi is the third EP by English-French rock band Stereolab, released in September 1992 by Too Pure. The title of the final track "Elektro (He Held the World in His Iron Grip)" is taken from the cover of the thirteenth issue of the comic book Tales of Suspense, released in 1961. It is the first Stereolab release to feature longtime drummer Andy Ramsay and backing vocalist Mary Hansen, who stayed with the band until her death in 2002. The EP was compiled on physical releases of Pulse of the Early Brain.

== Track listing ==
1. "Low Fi" – 5:23
2. "(Varoom!)" – 9:02
3. "Laisser-Faire" – 4:32
4. "Elektro (He Held the World in His Iron Grip)" – 5:46

== Personnel ==
Stereolab

- Seays Sadier – vocals, Moog synthesizer
- Mary Hanson – vocals (tracks 1, 3)
- Tim Gane – guitar, Moog synthesizer, Farfisa organ
- Martin Kean – bass
- Adam Ramsey – drums; bouzouki (track 2)

Additional musicians

- Robbs – piano (tracks 1, 4)
- Mick Conroy – Farfisa organ (track 3)
