= Anchors & Ampersands =

Studio album by Marker Starling
- Released: 2017
- Genre: Soft rock
- Label: Tin Angel

Marker Starling chronology
I'm Willing (2016)	Anchors & Ampersands (2017)	Trust an Amateur (2018)

Anchors & Ampersands is the seventh album by Canadian music artist Marker Starling (Chris A. Cummings), released in 2017. It is a collection of original material, with two cover versions – "I'll Be Around", & "Double Suicide" by Sandro Perri.

With songs written that span more than half his life, Cummings' seventh album has been called a "reflection on mortality", & a "mellow & tender" record with elements of soul, Brazilian & classic 70's soft-rock genres, as well as influence by Robert Wyatt.

== Track listing ==
=== Side 1 ===
1. Conundrum Redux
2. No More Partylights
3. Strong Suit
4. Playin' Along '99
5. Double Suicide

=== Side 2 ===
1. I'll Be Around
2. Shadows & Counterparts
3. Lost Look II
4. Blue Strike The Hours
5. Comes A Daybreak II

== Personnel ==
- Produced & mixed, vocals & guitar by Zack G
- Recorded at Rooster Studios & Buenos Bandidos Sound
- Mastered by João Carvalho at João Carvalho Mastering
- Artwork & Design by Sharmila Banerjee
- Chris A. Cummings – Writing & arrangement, vocals, Fender Rhodes, Wurlitzer, RMI Electra Piano, Lowrey MicroGenie, Roland RS-09, percussion
- Jay Anderson, Drums
- B.J. Cole, Pedal steel guitar
- Robin Dunn, Vocals
- Ryan Driver, Vocals & flute
- Thom Gill, Backing vocals
- Ben Gunning, Backing vocals
- Domenico Lancellotti, Percussion
- Matt McLaren, Bass guitar, guitar
- Alex Samaras, Backing vocals
- Jeremy Strachan, Tenor saxophone, Alto saxophone & Soprano saxophone
- Felicity Williams, Backing vocals
