= Switched On =

1992 compilation album by Stereolab

Compilation album by Stereolab
- Released: October 1992
- Genres: Post-rock; shoegaze; noise pop
- Length: 43:55
- Labels: Too Pure (UK); Slumberland (US)

Stereolab chronology
Low Fi (1992)	Switched On (1992)	Space Age Bachelor Pad Music (1993)

Stereolab Switched On chronology
Switched On (1992)	Refried Ectoplasm (1995)

Professional ratings
Review scores
Source	Rating
AllMusic	3.5/5 stars
Pitchfork	7.7/10

Switched On (also known as Switched On Stereolab or Switched On Volume 1) is a compilation of Stereolab's first three releases, and was originally released in 1992. The album's name is in tribute to Switched-On Bach (1968) and other similar titles from the late 1960s to 1970s that feature Moog synthesizers as the primary instrument. Switched On was later licensed to Slumberland Records for a US release, and Rough Trade Germany, for that country, both in 1992.

== Background ==
The album, compiling the Super 45 and Super-Electric 10"s along with the Stunning Debut Album 7", forms the first part of a pentalogy of Stereolab rarities collections along with Refried Ectoplasm (1995), Aluminum Tunes (1998), Electrically Possessed (2021), and Pulse of the Early Brain (2022).

== Track listing ==
No.	Title	Original release	Length
1.	"Super-Electric"	Super-Electric	5:22
2.	"Doubt"	Stunning Debut Album	3:26
3.	"Au grand jour'"	Super 45	3:27
4.	"The Way Will Be Opening"	Super-Electric	4:07
5.	"Brittle"	Super 45	3:47
6.	"Contact"	Super-Electric	8:17
7.	"Au grand jour"	Super 45	3:40
8.	"High Expectation"	Super-Electric	3:32
9.	"The Light That Will Cease to Fail"	Super 45	3:23
10.	"Changer"	Stunning Debut Album	4:54

== Personnel ==
- Laetitia Sadier - vocals
- Gina Morris - vocals
- Tim Gane - guitar, Moog synthesizer, Farfisa organ
- Martin Kean - bass
- Joe Dilworth - drums
