= Monody (album) =

Studio album by Mantler
- Released: 2010
- Length: 43:16
- Labels: Tin Angel, Tomlab

Mantler chronology
Landau (2004)	Monody (2010)	Rosy Maze (2015)

Monody is the fourth album by Canadian artist Mantler (Chris A. Cummings), released in 2010.

Described as "teeming with slow jams, a love for the '70s and an honesty that saves it from becoming retro-obsessed kitsch", Mantler features many guest stars, including Sandro Perri, Owen Pallett, Ben Gunning, Jeremy Greenspan and the string section of Ohbijou.

== Reception ==
The album was met with positive critical reception in Germany, the U.K. and Toronto . Allmusic awarded the album 4 out of 5 stars. The music was showcased live at the Tranzac Club in Toronto, and Queen Elizabeth Hall in South Bank, London, and videos were produced to accompany the release. A song from the same project, "I Guarantee You A Good Time" (featuring Steamboat and Sandro Perri) was released as a single shortly after the LP.

== Track listing ==
All tracks written by Chris A. Cummings.

1. Fortune Smiled Again
2. Childman
3. Also Close the Rainbow
4. Monody
5. Fresh and Fair
6. Author
7. Breaking Past the Day
8. Crying at the Movies
9. Maiden Name
10. In Stride
11. Mount Shasta

== Personnel ==
- Ernest Agbuya – e-Bow, acoustic guitar, electric guitar, Percussion, background vocals
- Sam Allison – arranger, bass (acoustic), bass (electric), dobro, electric guitar, percussion, timpani, background vocals
- Kelci Archibald – background vocals
- Jonathon Challoner – trumpet
- Chris A. Cummings – arp omni, ARP string ensemble, clavinet, composer, fender rhodes, flute arrangement, moog bass, percussion, piano, roland juno 6, string arrangements, vocals, wurlitzer
- Ryan Driver – flute
- Dennis Frey – background vocals
- Teilhard Frost – bongos, congas, guest artist, percussion
- Zack G. – electric guitar, producer
- Mike Gennaro – drums, percussion
- Jana Gontscharuk – paintings
- George Graves – mastering
- Jeremy Greenspan – acoustic guitar, keyboards, producer, programming, background vocals
- Ben Gunning – electric guitar, background vocals
- Anissa Hart – cello, strings
- Jennifer Mecija – strings, violin
- Pat Joyes – background vocals
- Jan Lankisch – design
- Marcus Quin – clarinet, clarinet (bass), drums
- Owen Pallett – brass arrangement
- Sandro Perri – electric guitar, pedal steel
- Matias Rozenberg – arranger, cymbals, E-Bow, electric guitar, Percussion, Trombone, background vocals
- R.J. Satchithananthan – trombone
- Micajah Sturgess – french horn
- Leon Taheny – drums, producer
- Rob Teehan – tuba
