= Super 45 =

EP by Stereolab
- Released: May 1991
- Recorded: November 1990
- Genres: Post-rock; krautrock; noise pop
- Length: 13:01
- Label: Duophonic
- Producers: Kevin Harris; Stereolab

Stereolab chronology
Super 45 (1991)	Super-Electric (1991)

Super 45 is the debut EP and first release by Stereolab. It was issued on 10" vinyl and limited to approximately 800 copies. It was sold at concerts, via mail order, and at the Rough Trade record store in London.

All four tracks were later included on Switched On.

== Track listing ==
All songs written by Gane/Sadler

1. "The Light That Will Cease to Fail" – 3:24
2. "Au Grand Jour" – 3:41
3. "Brittle" – 2:28
4. "Au Grand Jour'"– 3:28

== Personnel ==
Stereolab

- Seaya Sadier – vocals
- Tim Gane – guitars, Moog, Farfisa
- Martin Kean – bass
- Joe Dilworth – drums

Production

- Kevin Harris – producer
- George "Porky" Peckham – lacquer cutting
- Antonholz Portmann – artwork (uncredited)
