= Trust an Amateur =

Studio album by Marker Starling
- Released: 2019
- Genre: Soft rock
- Label: Tin Angel

Marker Starling chronology
| Anchors & Ampersands (2017) | Trust an Amateur (2019) | High January (2020) |

Trust an Amateur is the eighth album by Canadian music artist Marker Starling (Chris A. Cummings), released in January 2019. It is a collection of original material, with one cover version of "Fly Away", which was a song Cummings co-wrote for the musical "Spirits" with three others, including actor/comedian/musician Dennis Frey. The songs sprang from a period of collective grief and joy, as Cummings dealt with the death of Frey, and experienced the birth and first years of his first child.

"Fly Away" has sublime hooks, with the keyboard holding the song down and the lilt of Cummings' high notes reeling you in. - Kaitlin Ruether, Exclaim!

== Track listing ==
=== Side 1 ===
1. Silver Morn
2. Three Cheers
3. Stoney Flame
4. Fly Away (from the musical "Spirits")
5. Ancestor
6. Trust An Amateur

=== Side 2 ===
1. Mistaken I.D.
2. Crosstown Bulletin
3. Hold No Desire
4. Leavetaking
5. Mass Market Paperback
6. Lost Rooms

== Personnel ==
- Mixed & Recorded by Guy Sternberg at LowSwing Studio, Berlin
- Mastered by Sergey Luginin in Moscow
- Artwork & Design by Sharmila Banerjee
- Writing & arrangement, vocals, Hammond M-100, Wurlitzer, and percussion by Chris A. Cummings
- Photography by Colin Medley
- "Fly Away" written by Sam Allison, Chris A. Cummings, Dennis Frey & Peter Reitzel
