= Electrically Possessed =

Compilation album by Stereolab
- Released: 26 February 2021
- Recorded: 1994–2008
- Labels: Duophonic; Warp

Stereolab chronology
Not Music (2010)	Electrically Possessed (2021)	Pulse of the Early Brain (2022)

Stereolab Switched On chronology
Aluminum Tunes (1998)	Electrically Possessed (2021)	Pulse of the Early Brain (2022)

Electrically Possessed is a compilation album by the English-French band Stereolab, released on 26 February 2021 under Duophonic Records and Warp Records. It collects the band's rarities, and is the fourth of their Switched On compilation series. The track "Dimension M2" was released after the compilation's announcement, followed by "Household Names", taken from the mini album The First of the Microbe Hunters.

== Summary ==
The compilation begins with the EP, The First of the Microbe Hunters, described as having a "busy" and "jazz-based sound". This is followed by the next track "Solar Throw-Away (Original Verson)", which was unreleased. A different version of the track appeared in a 7-inch tour single, released on 10 April 2006, also containing "Jump Drive Shut-Out". The track "Pandora's Box of Worms" is an unreleased outtake from the Dots and Loops (1997) recording sessions. "Explosante Fixe" and "L'exostime Intérieur" were part of a 7-inch tour single released in September 2008. The Underground Is Coming was released as a 7-inch, 33 rpm tour single in 1999, with the tracks "The Super-it", "Fried Monkey Eggs (Instrumental)", "Fried Monkey Eggs (Vocal)" and "Monkey Jelly". "Monkey Jelly (Beats)" was unreleased.

"B.U.A" was written in collaboration with artist Charles Long for his 1998 artwork titled "B.U.A (Burnt Under Assembly) An Entanglement of Wholes" and was formerly unreleased. "Free Witch and No Bra Queen" and "Speck Voice" were a part of a 7-inch tour single released on 31 August 2001. "Heavy Denim Loop pt 2" is an unreleased outtake from the Mars Audiac Quintet (1994) recording sessions. "Variation One" was part of a soundtrack and compilation CD for the 2004 documentary Moog. "Dimension M2" was part of a compilation CD title Disko Cabine, released in June 2005. "Calimero" was collaboratively written with Brigitte Fontaine, released in July 1999 as a 7-inch single under Duophonic Super 45s.

== Reception ==
Professional ratings
Aggregate scores
Source	Rating
Metacritic	83/100
Review scores
Source	Rating
AllMusic	4/5 stars
Classic Rock	6/10
Exclaim!	7/10
MusicOMH	4.5/5 stars
Pitchfork	7.9/10
Uncut	7/10

Electrically Possessed was met with universal acclaim from music critics. At Metacritic, which assigns a weighted average rating out of 100 to reviews from mainstream publications, the album received an average score of 83, based on 6 reviews. While critics considered it a weaker volume in the Switched On series, they have seen Electrically Possessed as an example of the band releasing consistent material. Robert Ham of Pitchfork called the compilation "a bounty of highlights from a rich period when Tim Gane was writing pop songs with multi-layered, almost-proggy arrangements to better support frontwoman Lætitia Sadier’s dense sociopolitical lyrics." Regarding the compilation "cover[ring] nearly half of [Stereolab]'s career ", Heather Phares wrote that "by contrast, the original Switched On gathered just six months' worth of music -- but like the other volumes in the series, it captures the flavor of its era just as completely as Stereolab's full-lengths." Other reviewers of the compilation gave retrospective reappraisals to the band's post-Dots and Loops material in this time, which initially received mediocre to negative reviews.

Ham said that after the first seven tracks of the EP The First of the Microbe Hunters, the compilation "naturally doesn’t move along the same deliberate course as a proper album... The material compiled here isn’t sequenced chronologically, so the mood and sound jumps from track to track and there are a small number of nonessential inclusions, like ['Pandora's Box of Worms']". Daniel Sylvester of Exclaim! wrote that while Electrically Possessed "offers no real throwaways", he said the EP The First of the Microbe Hunters, "hasn't exactly improved with age aside from the rubbery, melodic standout 'Household Names'", and felt tracks such as "Explosante Fixe" and "Monkey Jelly" were "uninspired".

== Track listing ==
All tracks are written by Tim Gane and Lætitia Sadier, except where noted.

No.	Title	Writer(s)	Length
1.	"Outer Bongolia"	Gane, Andy Ramsay, Sean O'Hagan	9:29
2.	"Intervals"		4:38
3.	"Barock-Plastik"		3:17
4.	"Nomus Et Phusis"		4:23
5.	"I Feel the Air (Of Another Planet)"		8:12
6.	"Household Names"		3:43
7.	"Retrograde Mirror Form"		6:45
8.	"Solar Throw-Away" (original version)		3:06
9.	"Pandora's Box of Worms"	Gane, Ramsay	2:16
10.	"L'exotisme Intérieur"		3:23
11.	"The Super-It"		3:51
12.	"Jump Drive Shut-Out"		2:43
13.	"Explosante Fixe"		4:25
14.	"Fried Monkey Eggs" (instrumental)		2:08
15.	"Monkey Jelly"		1:54
16.	"B.U.A"		4:51
17.	"Free Witch and No Bra Queen"		4:44
18.	"Heavy Denim Loop Pt 2"	Gane	2:54
19.	"Variation One"	Gane	4:01
20.	"Monkey Jelly" (beats)		1:53
21.	"Dimension M2"		4:03
22.	"Solar Throw-Away"		3:59
23.	"Calimero"	Gane, Brigitte Fontaine	6:25
24.	"Fried Monkey Eggs" (vocal)		2:08
25.	"Speck Voice"		5:01

== Charts ==
Chart performance for Electrically Possessed
Chart (2021)	Peak position
German Albums (Offizielle Top 100)	88
