= Instant 0 in the Universe =

EP by Stereolab
- Released: 7 October 2003
- Recorded: 2003
- Length: 23:01
- Labels: Elektra (US); Duophonic (UK)

Stereolab chronology
ABC Music: The Radio 1 Sessions (2002)	Instant 0 in the Universe (2003)	Margerine Eclipse (2004)

Professional ratings
Review scores
Source	Rating
AllMusic	link

Instant 0 in the Universe is a 2003 EP by Stereolab. It was released as three 7" singles in a slipcase as well as on CD. This was the first release by the group after the death of longtime member Mary Hansen in December 2002. It was also the first release recorded at Stereolab's "Instant Zero" studio, north of Bordeaux in France.

The tracks "...Sudden Stars" and "Hillbilly Motobike" also appeared on the following full-length album Margerine Eclipse. The EP is mixed in "dual mono"—that is, with each instrumental or vocal part hard-panned to either the left or right channel, a technique which would also be used throughout Margerine Eclipse.

== Track listing ==
1. ""...Sudden Stars"" – 4:40
2. "Jaunty Monty and the Bubbles of Silence" – 4:10
3. "Good Is Me" – 5:25
4. "Microclimate" – 4:16
5. "Mass Riff" – 4:25
6. "Hillbilly Motobike" – 2:23

Hillbilly Motobike only features on the 7" vinyl edition. It is not listed anywhere on the package and appears on side two of the third record.
