= The Trip (Lætitia Sadier album) =

Studio album by Lætitia Sadier
- Released: September 2010 (US)
- Recorded: 2010
- Genre: Dream Pop, Indie
- Length: 34:25
- Label: Drag City (US)
- Producer: Emma Mario, Lætitia Sadier

Lætitia Sadier chronology
The Trip (2010)	Silencio (2012)

Professional ratings
Review scores
Source	Rating
Allmusic link	3.5/5 stars
Pitchfork Media link	(8.2/10)
Uncut	3/5 stars

The Trip is the debut solo album by French indie musician Lætitia Sadier, known as member of Stereolab and her side project Monade. The album was recorded in 2010 and was released in September of the same year.

Beside nine original compositions by Sadier, the record contains three covers: "By the Sea", originally performed by Wendy and Bonnie, "Un Soir, Un Chien", written by Fred Chichin and Catherine Ringer of Les Rita Mitsouko and the standard "Summertime", composed by George Gershwin and DuBose Heyward.

The record is dedicated to Sadier's sister Noelle, who had committed suicide a short time before the album's recording.

The album was received well by critics, earning an 8.2 out of 10 rating by Pitchfork Media and a 3.5 out of 5 rating by Allmusic.

== Track listing ==
All songs written by Lætitia Sadier, except where noted.

=== Side one ===
1. "One Million Year Trip" – 5:02
2. "Fluid Sand" – 4:33
3. "Our Interests Are the Same" – 0:10
4. "Natural Child" – 4:00
5. "Statues Can Bend" – 2:57
6. "By the Sea" (Wendy and Bonnie) - 3:45

=== Side two ===
7. "Unfasten" – 0:24
8. "Un Soir, Un Chien" (Catherine Ringer, Fred Chichin) – 4:50
9. "Another Monster" – 2:49
10. "Ceci est le coeur" – 3:20
11. "Summertime" (George Gershwin, DuBose Heyward) - 1:59
12. "Release, Open Your Little Earthling Hands" - 0:29

== Personnel ==
- Lætitia Sadier - vocals, guitar, bass on track 12
- Julien Gasc - bass, acoustic guitar, piano prepare, keyboards, incidental noises, vocals
- Emma Mario - drums, percussion, electronics, vocals
- April March - additional vocals
- Richard Swift - drums, keyboards, subtle electronics, vocals
- Yuuki Matthews - bass, vocals, acoustic guitar on track 1
- Rebecca Gates - additional vocals
- Recorded and engineered by Emma Mario
- Produced and mixed by Mario/Sadier
