= I'm Willing =

Studio album by Marker Starling
- Released: 2016
- Genre: Soft rock
- Label: Tin Angel

Marker Starling chronology
| Rosy Maze (2015) | I'm Willing (2016) | Anchors & Ampersands (2017) |

I'm Willing is the sixth album by Canadian music artist Marker Starling (Chris A. Cummings), released in 2016 in Europe and in 2017 in North America. It is a collection of cover versions.

Limiting himself to a much pared-down instrumentation in contrast to 2015's Rosy Maze, Cummings recorded the album in a very short time in Paris, which he feels helped the creative process retain a vibrancy necessary to the project. Having Lætitia Sadier of Stereolab contributing vocals also helped him achieve the ambiance he strove to create as the album has a recurring theme of love and affection. The cross-section of songs covered ranges from highly regarded classics to little known gems that Cummings discovered over the years as an ardent vinyl collector.

== Track listing ==
=== Side 1 ===
1. Stormy (Dennis Yost, J.R. Cobb, Buddy Buie) (3:31)
2. A Perfect Day (Bobby Cole) (3:36)
3. I'm Willing (Tommy Keith, Arthur Cole) (3:44)
4. For Real (Richard Elijah Flowers) (4:13)
5. Amsterdam (John Cale) (2:52)

=== Side 2 ===
6. Lost in Paradise (Caetano Veloso) (3:13)
7. Meaning Of Love (Steve Kuhn) (2:43)
8. Would You Believe in Me (Jon Lucien) (2:39)
9. Moves (Doug Hammond) (2:34)
10. The Smiling Hour (Abre Alas) (Ivan Lins, Vítor Martins, Louis Oliveira) (3:40)

== Personnel ==
- Produced and mixed by Emma Mario
- Recorded at Panorama Studio, Paris
- Mastered by Harris Newman at Grey Market Mastering
- Illustrations by Oliver Husain
- Design by Jan Lankisch
- Chris A. Cummings – vocals, Yamaha CP-80
- Lætitia Sadier – vocals
- Nina Savary – vocals
- Julien Gasc – bass, backing vocals
- Nina Savary, Olia Eichenbaum – backing vocals
- Emma Mario – percussion
