= Margerine Eclipse =

Studio album by Stereolab
- Released: 27 January 2004
- Recorded: 2003
- Studio: Instant Zero (France)
- Genres: Experimental rock; post-rock; electronica; lounge
- Length: 53:41
- Languages: English; French
- Labels: Duophonic; Elektra

Stereolab chronology
Instant 0 in the Universe (2003)	Margerine Eclipse (2004)	Oscillons from the Anti-Sun (2005)

Professional ratings
Aggregate scores
Source	Rating
Metacritic	77/100
Review scores
Source	Rating
AllMusic	4/5 stars
Alternative Press	4/5
Drowned in Sound	8/10
Entertainment Weekly	A−
Mojo	3/5 stars
The Observer	4/5 stars
Pitchfork	7.6/10
Rolling Stone	3/5 stars
Spin	B−
Uncut	3/5 stars

Margerine Eclipse is the eighth studio album by English-French rock band Stereolab. It was released on 27 January 2004 in the United States by Elektra Records and on 2 February 2004 in the United Kingdom by Duophonic Records. The album is in large part a eulogy to band member Mary Hansen, who died in 2002.

By June 2004, Margerine Eclipse had sold over 40,000 copies in the US. A remastered and expanded edition of the album was released by Duophonic and Warp on 29 November 2019.

== Background ==
In December 2002, Stereolab member Mary Hansen was killed in a cycling accident. The band subsequently dedicated Margerine Eclipse to Hansen, with the lyrics of the song "Feel and Triple" making specific reference to her. Shortly before work commenced on the album, band members Tim Gane and Lætitia Sadier ended their romantic relationship. Their breakup is alluded to in Sadier's lyrics for the song "Hillbilly Motobike".

Margerine Eclipse was mixed with full stereo separation – or as Stereolab termed it, in "dual mono". For every song, the band made two recordings – each with a different arrangement – then created a final mix by synchronising both recordings together, with one on the left channel and the other on the right channel. The technique was also used on the band's 2003 EP Instant 0 in the Universe.

== Track listing ==
All tracks are written by Tim Gane and Lætitia Sadier.

No.	Title	Length
1.	"Vonal Declosion"	3:34
2.	"Need to Be"	4:50
3.	"'...Sudden Stars'"	4:41
4.	"Cosmic Country Noir"	4:47
5.	"La Demeure"	4:36
6.	"Margerine Rock"	2:56
7.	"The Man with 100 Cells"	3:47
8.	"Margerine Melodie"	6:19
9.	"Hillbilly Motobike"	2:23
10.	"Feel and Triple"	4:53
11.	"Bop Scotch"	3:59
12.	"Dear Marge"	6:56
Total length:		53:41

- On the expanded edition, "Vonal Declosion" is extended to 4:41, "Hillbilly Motobike" is extended to 4:51, and "Bop Scotch" is extended to 4:34; "Dear Marge" is shortened to 6:22.

Japanese edition
No.	Title	Length
10.	"La Spirale"	2:24
11.	"Feel and Triple"	4:53
12.	"Bop Scotch"	3:59
13.	"Dear Marge"	6:56
Total length:		56:05

2019 expanded edition bonus disc
No.	Title	Length
1.	"Mass Riff"	6:30
2.	"Good Is Me"	5:27
3.	"Microclimate"	4:39
4.	"Mass Riff" (instrumental intro)	1:13
5.	"Jaunty Monty and the Bubbles of Silence"	4:30
6.	"Banana Monster ne répond plus"	4:28
7.	"University Microfilms International"	4:01
8.	"Rose, My Rocket-Brain! (Rose, le cerveau electronique de ma fusée!)"	5:26
Total length:		36:14

== Personnel ==
Credits are adapted from the album's liner notes.

Stereolab

- Tim Gane – electric guitar, electronics, organ
- Lætitia Sadier – vocals, trombone on "Margerine Melodie"
- Dominic Jeffery – organ, electric piano, harpsichord, celeste
- Simon Johns – bass, drums on "Margerine Rock"
- Andy Ramsay – drums, drum machine

Additional musicians

- Fulton Dingley – drum machine, synthesizer, MIDI, percussion
- Sean O'Hagan – keyboards, acoustic and electric guitars, other instruments
- Jan St. Werner – electronics on "Vonal Declosion" and "Feel and Triple"

Production

- Fulton Dingley – engineering, mixing
- Stereolab (credited as "The Groop") – mixing

== Charts ==
Chart (2004)	Peak position
Scottish Albums (Official Charts)	86
UK Albums (Official Charts)	108
UK Independent Albums (Official Charts)	11
US Billboard 200	174
US Heatseekers Albums (Billboard)	6
