= Pulse of the Early Brain =

Compilation album by Stereolab
- Released: 2 September 2022
- Recorded: 1992–2008
- Length: 118:54
- Label: Duophonic; Warp

Stereolab chronology
Electrically Possessed (2021)	Pulse of the Early Brain (2022)	Instant Holograms on Metal Film (2025)

Stereolab Switched On chronology
Electrically Possessed (2021)	Pulse of the Early Brain (2022)

Singles from Pulse of the Early Brain
- 1. "Robot Riot" Released: 24 June 2022; 2. "Simple Headphone Mind/Trippin' With the Birds" Released: 3 August 2022; 3. "Cybele's Reverie (Live at the Hollywood Bowl)" Released: 24 August 2022

Pulse of the Early Brain is a compilation album by the English-French avant-pop band Stereolab, released on 2 September 2022 under Duophonic Records and Warp Records. It is the fifth installment of the band's Switched On series which collects the band's rarities, such as the extended plays (EPs) Simple Headphone Mind (1997) and Low Fi (1992); bonus and exclusive tracks from Chemical Chords (2008); and individual tracks from other albums, split singles and flexi discs. Unlike previous Switched On releases, which compiled each of the band's eras in chronological order, Pulse of the Early Brain covers rarities from all over their career.

The compilation was announced with the release of the single "Robot Riot" in June 2022 and the singles "Simple Headphone Mind" and "Trippin With the Birds" in August. Pulse of the Early Brain received acclaim from music critics, who praised the inclusion of Simple Headphone Mind and Low Fi. It ranked at number 3 in the UK Independent Albums Chart and at number 66 in the UK Albums Chart.

== Summary ==
The compilation begins with the Simple Headphone Mind EP, consisting of the title track and "Trippin' With the Birds". It is a 1997 collaboration with Nurse with Wound in which both tracks rework Stereolab's track "The Long Hair of Death" (previously released in a split single with Yo La Tengo and on Aluminum Tunes) into "euphoric, psychedelic motorik". This lasts for 31 minutes and is followed by the next EP Low Fi (1992). It marks the first appearances of members Mary Hansen and Andy Ramsay and contains "blissfully loud and transporting rock" that has a variations of "a hypnotic whir that seems unencumbered by the rules of gravity: the analog rumble, synth squiggles, and strummed chords are a collective force onto itself."

"Robot Riot" is an unreleased track "with its insistent strums giving way to a coda of hooky harmonies". It was intended for a sculpture in 2000 by Charles Long, but the track "Unity Purity Occasional" with its "percolating rhythms, retro-futurisms, and ye-ye melodies" was chosen instead. The tracks "Spool of Collusion" and "Forensic Itch" were part of an exclusive 2008 7" that came with the first 5000 copies of Chemical Chords. "Magne-Music" and "The Nth Degrees" were also bonus tracks for the limited edition UK CD of Chemical Chords. The "avant-garde sci-fi jazz" song "Symbolic Logic of Now!" was released in a 1998 split single with Soi-Dissant, released under Luke Warm Music. The compilation contains a demo version of "Ronco Symphony", taken from the 1993 EP Space Age Batchelor Pad Music.

"ABC", with "gnarled, fuzzed-out guitar riff hints at hard rock before it gets engulfed by studio trickery", is a cover of the Multitude, from the Godz album The Third Testament, originally for the tribute album Godz Is Not A Put On in 1996. "Blaue Milch" is a "reimagining of a Peter Thomas Sound Orchestra piece" released under Bungalow Records in 1998. "Yes Sir! I Can Moogie!" and "XXXOOO" are brief tracks that were released on flexi discs under the labels Wurlitzer Jukebox in 1995 and Encore! in 1992 respectively. The compilation has an original version of "Plastic Mile", which was re-recorded for Fab Four Suture in 2006, and a "spectral yet hard-hitting" remix of "Refractions of The Plastic Pulse" by Autechre, released in 1998. The album closes with a 2004 live performance of "Cybele's Reverie" at the Hollywood Bowl.

== Release and reception ==
Pulse of the Early Brain was announced with the release of the single "Robot Riot" on 24 June 2022, followed by "Simple Headphone Mind" and "Trippin' With The Birds" on 3 August and "Cybele's Reverie (Live at the Hollywood Bowl)" on 24 August. The compilation released on 2 September under Duophonic Records and Warp Records. It was made available to purchase on vinyl, CD, and digital download. Limited vinyl and CD editions were released in a mirriboard sleeve. The digital edition only contains 16 tracks out of 21, with the EP Low Fi and the demo of "Ronco Symphony" being excluded due to digital licensing restrictions. Low Fi had a separate 2022 digital re-release, and the "Ronco Symphony" demo appears as a bonus track for the 2018 digital re-release of Space Age Batchelor Pad Music, both under Too Pure records. Pulse of the Early Brain ranked at number 3 in the UK Independent Albums Chart and at number 66 in the UK Albums Chart. It also peaked at number 10 in the Scottish Albums Chart and number 89 in the German Albums Chart.

Professional ratings
Aggregate scores
Source	Rating
Metacritic	82/100
Review scores
Source	Rating
AllMusic	4.5/5 stars
The A.V. Club	B+
Clash	8/10
Classic Rock	6/10
Mojo	4/5 stars
Pitchfork	6.6/10
Record Collector	4/5 stars
Uncut	4/5 stars

Pulse of the Early Brain was met with universal acclaim from music critics. At Metacritic, which assigns a weighted average rating out of 100 to reviews from mainstream publications, the album received an average score of 82, based on seven reviews. Critics considered the inclusion of the EPs Simple Headphone Mind and Low Fi to be highlights of the compilation. Acting as the first six tracks, some praised the transition between both EPs. Stephen Thomas Erlewine commented: "Oozing with ambient grooves and catchy harmonies, the fifth volume of rarities from the avant-pop quintet calls back to their space-age prime." Piers Martin of Uncut magazine considered the compilation to be "the best one yet".

Some critics have simultaneously considered the compilation to be the most and least essential release in Stereolab's catalogue. Robert Ham of Pitchfork questioned the inclusion of short tracks and felt that the EP Simple Headphone Mind were "skeletal and unfinished." A critic for Classic Rock magazine panned the same EP, arguing that the compilation "never fully recovers" from it.

== Track listing ==
No.	Title	Length
1.	"Simple Headphone Mind"	10:46
2.	"Trippin' With the Birds"	21:01
3.	"Low Fi"	5:22
4.	"[Varoom!]"	9:19
5.	"Laisser-Faire"	4:35
6.	"Elektro [he held the world in his iron grip]"	8:01
7.	"Robot Riot"	2:56
8.	"Spool of Collusion"	2:13
9.	"Symbolic Logic Of Now!"	4:05
10.	"Forensic Itch"	3:06
11.	"Ronco Symphony" (demo)	1:00
12.	"ABC"	5:16
13.	"Magne-Music"	3:53
14.	"Blaue Milch"	4:58
15.	"Yes Sir! I Can Moogie!"	1:03
16.	"Plastic Mile" (original version)	6:36
17.	"Refractions In The Plastic Pulse" (Feebate Mix)	7:51
18.	"Unity Purity Occasional"	2:18
19.	"The Nth Degrees"	4:14
20.	"XXXOOO"	1:01
21.	"Cybele's Reverie" (live at the Hollywood Bowl)	5:47
Total length:		118:54

Notes: Tracks 3–6 and 11 appear in physical editions only.

== Charts ==
Chart performance for Pulse of the Early Brain
Chart (2022)	Peak position
German Albums (Offizielle Top 100)	89
Scottish Albums (OCC)	10
UK Albums (OCC)	66
UK Independent Albums (OCC)	3
