= High January =

Studio album by Marker Starling
- Released: 24 April 2020
- Genre: Soft rock
- Label: Tin Angel

Marker Starling chronology
Trust An Amateur (2019)	High January (2020)

High January is the ninth album by Canadian music artist Marker Starling (Chris A. Cummings), released on 24 April 2020. It is composed entirely of original material, being produced for the first time by Sean O'Hagan, whose previous work with Stereolab, The High Llamas and Microdisney brought extensive experience to helping achieve a fully-realized Marker Starling sound. Laetitia Sadier, also of Stereolab, contributes vocals to two tracks, "Waiting for Grace" and "Starved for Glamour".

Tim Sendra of AllMusic wrote in his review, – ..."this is serious mood music and Cummings made a fine choice by picking a producer who knows how to sustain a consistent mood, and by bringing along his crack band to back him."

== Track listing ==
=== Side 1 ===
1. High January
2. Wait The Night
3. Drop And Pierce
4. Waiting For Grace

=== Side 2 ===
1. Move It On
2. Starved For Glamour
3. Coin of the Realm
4. A Little Joy

== Personnel ==
- Vocals – Laetitia Sadier
- Backing Vocals – Connor Blundell, Mason Le Long, Nicholas Krgovich
- Drums – Euan Rodger
- Guitar – Andy Whitehead
- Bass – Joe Carvell
- Artwork, Layout – Sharmila Banerjee
- Engineer, Audio mixing, Programming (Synthesizer) – Andy Ramsay
- Mastering – Noel Summerville
- Producer, Mixing, Bass, Electric Organ [Hohner Symphonic 30N], Synthesizer [Roland System 100], Programming – Sean O'Hagan
- Recording engineer [Additional] – Mason Le Long
- Written-By, Electric piano [RMI], Electric organ [Lowrey MicroGenie], Synthesizer [Solina String Ensemble], Synthesizer [Roland System 100], Electric Piano [Rhodes], Electric Piano [Wurlitzer], Synthesizer [WASP], Vocals – Chris A. Cummings

Recorded At – Press Play Studios / Mastered At – 3345 Mastering / Phonographic Copyright (p) – Tin Angel Records / Copyright (c) – Tin Angel Records
