= Rooting for Love =

Studio album by Lætitia Sadier
- Released: 23 February 2024
- Genre: Art rock
- Length: 41:45
- Label: Drag City
- Producer: Lætitia Sadier; Hannes Plattmeier

Lætitia Sadier chronology
Modern Cosmology (with Mombojó) (2023)	Rooting for Love (2024)

Singles from Rooting for Love
- 1. "New Moon" Released: 15 October 2021; 2. "Une Autre Attente" Released: 13 November 2023; 3. "Panser L'inacceptable" Released: 10 January 2024; 4. "Who + What" Released: 5 February 2024

Rooting for Love is the fifth solo album by Stereolab singer Lætitia Sadier, released on 23 February 2024 by Drag City. The album was preceded by four singles.

== Background and release ==
The album was first mentioned on 15 October 2021, when Sadier released the single "New Moon". Per a press release, the album was due for release in 2022 by Drag City and Duophonic Super 45s. "New Moon" was recorded in London with Hannes Plattmeier, and came with a music video directed by Sadier and Tanya Small.

The album was announced on 13 November 2023, with its release set for 23 February 2024 by Drag City. The announcement came with the album's lead single, "Une Autre Attente", and a music video directed by Spencer Bewley. The third single, "Panser L'inacceptable", was released on 10 January 2024 with a music video co-directed by Sadier and Christopher Thomas Allen. The fourth single, "Who + What", was released on 5 February, with Sadier describing the song as a "transformational sonic balm to aid the evolution of Earth's traumatized civilizations".

Rooting for Love is Sadier's first solo album since 2017's Find Me Finding You, released under the name Lætitia Sadier Source Ensemble. It also follows Modern Cosmology, a collaborative album with Brazilian group Mombojó, which was released in May 2023.

== Recording ==
Work on Rooting for Love began in 2018 with the recording of "New Moon", which was inspired by Sadier's "big idea of fusing jazz chords with minimalism, like Terry Riley and Steve Reich." The project was put on hold in 2019 when Stereolab reunited, then continued with Sadier recording with a choir.

== Style ==
The album has been called art rock, with elements of 1960s French pop, 1990s electronica, and Krautrock, all of which are familiar from Sadier's work with Stereolab.

== Reception ==
Rooting for Love ratings
Aggregate scores
Source	Rating
AnyDecentMusic?	7.7/10
Metacritic	81/100
Review scores
Source	Rating
AllMusic	4/5 stars
The Arts Desk	5/5 stars
Exclaim!	7/10
Mojo	4/5 stars
MusicOMH	4/5 stars
Pitchfork	7.5/10
Spectrum Culture	69%

According to the review aggregator Metacritic, Rooting for Love received "universal acclaim" based on a weighted average score of 81 out of 100 from 11 critic scores. The Arts Desk's Joe Muggs called the album "just beautiful" and "shot through with numinosity, generosity, and the mathematical shapes form wonderful dream-like constellations." Spectrum Culture's Will Pinfold called the album "a good but not great example of Lætitia Sadier's solo work." The Quietus's "An antidote to the corporate pop that forces us to be joyful" which "offers a genuine alternative without being militant or hideously self aware." The Fader's Raphael Helfand wrote that Sadier's "incomparable voice is as crystalline and agile an instrument as it was" in 1990. Mojo's Irina Shtreis called the album "an alleviating statement from an artist whose curiosity and striving for development have remained a driving force."

== Track listing ==
All tracks are written by Lætitia Sadier.

Rooting for Love track listing
No.	Title	Length
1.	"Who + What"	3:57
2.	"Protéïformunité"	5:02
3.	"Une Autre Attente"	2:42
4.	"The Dash"	3:07
5.	"Don't Forget You're Mine"	4:38
6.	"Panser L'inacceptable"	4:07
7.	"The Inner Smile"	4:48
8.	"La Nageuse Nue"	3:56
9.	"New Moon"	4:07
10.	"Cloud 6"	5:21
Total length:		41:45

== Personnel ==
- Lætitia Sadier – producer, arranger, mixing engineer
- Hannes Plattmeier – producer, arranger, mixing engineer (1, 4, 6, 9, 10)
- Emmanuel Mario – arranger (2, 3, 5–8), mixing engineer (2, 3, 5–8)

== Charts ==
Chart performance for Rooting for Love
Chart (2024)	Peak position
Scottish Albums (OCC)	45
UK Independent Albums (OCC)	28
