= Something Shines =

Studio album by Lætitia Sadier
- Released: 23 September 2014
- Recorded: August 2013–April 2014
- Studio: Oyster Concrete, London; Little Tornados, Zurich
- Length: 45:05
- Label: Drag City
- Producer: Emma Mario

Lætitia Sadier chronology
Silencio (2012)	Something Shines (2014)	Find Me Finding You (2017)

Professional ratings
Aggregate scores
Source	Rating
Metacritic	71/100
Review scores
Source	Rating
AllMusic	3.5/5 stars
Blurt Magazine	2/5 stars
Exclaim	7/10}
The Line of Best Fit	5.5/10
Mojo	4/5 stars
Pitchfork	6.7
PopMatters	6/10
Tiny Mix Tapes	3.5/5 marks
Uncut	4/5 stars
The Wire	4/5 stars

Something Shines is the third studio album from the French singer Lætitia Sadier, was released on 23 September, 2014, under Drag City records.

== Track listing ==
All tracks are written by Lætitia Sadier, except where noted

No.	Title	Writer(s)	Length
1.	"Quantum Soup"		6:57
2.	"Then I Will Love You Again"		2:51
3.	"The Milk of Human Tenderness"		3:11
4.	"The Scene of the Lie"		5:26
5.	"Release from the Centre of Your Heart"	Alice Rossi, Giorgio Tuma	2:56
6.	"Butter Side Up"		6:36
7.	"Transhumance"		4:06
8.	"Echo Port"		3:51
9.	"Oscuridad"		3:18
10.	"Life Is Winning"		5:53
Total length:			45:05

== Personnel ==
Credits adapted from liner notes.

- Lætitia Sadier - voice, guitar, bass pedals, choir, mixing
- Michael Andrews - 80's electric guitar
- Gabriele Blandini - trumpet
- Matthieu Beck - choir
- Jean-Christophe Chante - strings, trumpet
- Ubaldo Chirizzi - cello
- Macke Depret - guitars (1)
- Mia Depret-Pioline - vocals
- Massimiliano Giannuzzi - bass, electric guitar
- Alfonso Girardo - violin
- Atomic Jetman - vocals, sleeve
- Arianna Latarta - viola
- Mason Le Long - guitar (1), guitar lead (6)
- Stefano Manca - recording and mixing (4)
- Giuseppe Magagnino - piano, wurlitzer, string and horns arrangement (4)
- Emma Mario - percussion, drums, electronics, vocals, production, mixing
- Giuseppe Manta - acoustic guitar
- Marie Merlet - choir
- Jose Missionario - bass (4)
- Chiquinho Moreira - electronics (1), keys (4), effects (4)
- Xavi Munoz - bass, vocals, choir
- Armelle Pioline - vocals, keyboards (8)
- Matilde De Rubertis - chorus
- David Thayer - vocals, organs, electronics, vibraphone, flute, Garken SX150, photography
- Giulia Tedesco - chorus
- Giorgio Tuma - crumar synth, chorus, string and horn arrangements (4)
- Marco Tuma - flute
- Antonio Valsano - congas
