= Monstre Cosmic =

Studio album by Monade
- Released: 19 February 2008
- Recorded: March − April 2007
- Studio: Instant Zero Studio, France
- Length: 51:28
- Label: Too Pure
- Producer: Lætitia Sadier; Emma Mario; Julien Gasc; Joe Watson

Monade chronology
A Few Steps More (2005)	Monstre Cosmic (2008)

Professional ratings
Review scores
Source	Rating
AllMusic	4/5 stars
MusicOMH	3/5 stars
Pitchfork	7.1
PopMatters	5/10
The Skinny	3/5 stars
Tiny Mix Tapes	2.5/5 marks

Monstre Cosmic is the third and final studio album from the French band Monade, released on 19 February 2008 on Too Pure records.

== Track listing ==
All tracks are written by Lætitia Sadier, except the lyrics on track 5 by Nicolas Etienne

No.	Title	Length
1.	"Noir Noir"	0:53
2.	"Étoile"	4:59
3.	"Lost Language"	6:11
4.	"Elle Topo"	4:27
5.	"Messe Joyeuse"	3:06
6.	"Regarde"	3:37
7.	"Invitation"	6:45
8.	"Tout en Tout Est Un"	2:56
9.	"Entre Chien Et Loup"	5:02
10.	"Change of Destination"	13:32
Total length:		51:28

== Personnel ==
Credits adapted from liner notes.

- Lætitia Sadier – guitar, singing, trombone, additional sounds
- Marie Merlet – bass guitar, singing
- Nicolas Etienne – keys (3, 4, 5, 7, 9 ,10), guitar (9), sleeve
- David Loquier – drums (3, 5, 7, 9, 10)
- Joe Watson – various keys and piano (3, 5, 7, 9, 10) acoustic guitar (10), string arrangements (3, 5, 7, 9), production (3, 5, 7, 9, 10)
- Emma Mario – drums and percussion (1, 2, 4, 6, 8), recording (1, 2, 4, 6, 8), additional sounds
- Julien Gasc – bass, slide guitar, singing. piano, keys (1, 2, 4, 6, 8)
- Rachel Ortas – additional singing (2, 5, 7, 10), illustrations
- Marie-Laure Prioleau – strings
- Emmanuèle Faure – strings
- Nicolas Miller – strings
- Rainer Halter – strings
