= Silencio (album) =

Studio album by Lætitia Sadier
- Released: 24 July 2012
- Studios: Aquaserge (Toulouse, France); Église St. Blaise (Verfeil, France); Nada (Chicago Illinois); Revolver (United States); Soma (Chicago, Illinois)
- Length: 47:37
- Label: Drag City
- Producers: Lætitia Sadier; Fulton Dingley; James Elkington; Emma Mario

Lætitia Sadier chronology
The Trip (2010)	Silencio (2012)	Something Shines (2014)

Professional ratings
Aggregate scores
Source	Rating
Metacritic	75/100
Review scores
Source	Rating
AllMusic	4/5 stars
Exclaim	7/10
Mojo	3/5 stars
Paste Magazine	6.4/10
Pitchfork	6.7
PopMatters	7/10 stars
Q	4/5 stars
Tiny Mix Tapes	3.5/5 marks
Uncut	4/5 stars
The Wire	4/5 stars

Silencio is the second studio album from the French singer Lætitia Sadier, was released on 24 July 2012 under Drag City records.

== Track listing ==
All tracks are written by Lætitia Sadier.

No.	Title	Length
1.	"The Rule of the Game"	5:00
2.	"Find Me the Pulse of the Universe"	2:53
3.	"Silent Spot"	3:00
4.	"Auscultation To the Nation"	4:46
5.	"There is a Price To Pay For Freedom (and it isn't Security)"	4:21
6.	"Moi Sans Zach"	3:48
7.	"Between Earth and Heaven"	4:08
8.	"Lightning Thunderbolt"	3:16
9.	"Fragment pour Le Future de L'homme"	4:10
10.	"Merci De M'avoir Donné La Vie"	4:34
11.	"Next Time You See Me"	2:42
12.	"Invitation Au Silence"	4:29
Total length:		47:37

== Personnel ==
Credits adapted from liner notes.

- Lætitia Sadier – voice, guitar, moog, choir, mixing
- Julien Barbagallo – drums, percussion, choir
- Fulton Dingley – mixing
- James Elkington – guitar, keyboards, moog, choir, mixing, backing vocals
- Julien Gasc – guitar, keyboards, piano, choir
- Audrey Ginestet – bass, choir, percussion
- Benjamin Glibert – engineer, guitar, double bass
- Nick Macri – bass, double bass
- John McEntire – drum engineer
