= Find Me Finding You =

Studio album by Lætitia Sadier
- Released: 24 March 2017
- Recorded: 2016
- Studio: Oyster Concrete, London; Little Tornados, Zurich; Le Bergerie Leucate; Recife, Brazil
- Genre: Bossa nova; easy listening
- Length: 42:25
- Label: Drag City
- Producer: Emmanuel Mario

Lætitia Sadier chronology
Something Shines (2014)	Find Me Finding You (2017)

Professional ratings
Aggregate scores
Source	Rating
Metacritic	81/100
Review scores
Source	Rating
AllMusic	4/5 stars
The Irish Times	4/5 stars
Loud and Quiet	9/10
Record Collector	4/5 stars
Pitchfork	6.8
Q	4/5 stars
Uncut	4/5 stars
The Wire	4/5 stars

Find Me Finding You is the fourth studio album from the French singer Lætitia Sadier, performing as the Lætitia Sadier Source Ensemble. It was released on 24 March 2017 under Drag City.

== Track listing ==
All tracks are written by Lætitia Sadier, except where noted

Find Me Finding You track listing
No.	Title	Writer(s)	Length
1.	"Undying Love for Humanity"		3:49
2.	"Double Voice, Extra Voice"		5:18
3.	"Love Captive"		4:05
4.	"Psychology Active (Finding You)"		6:09
5.	"Committed"		3:55
6.	"Reflectors"		4:01
7.	"Deep Background"	Chris A. Cummings	3:58
8.	"Galactic Emergence"		4:16
9.	"The Woman with the Invisible Necklace"		3:26
10.	"Sacred Project"		3:28
Total length:			42:25

== Personnel ==
- Lætitia Sadier – voice, vocal arrangements (7), guitar (2–6, 8–10), keys (1, 5, 10), percussion (1), drums (2), synths (2), Minimoog (9–10), effects (4), mixing
- Homero Basilo – pandeiro (1), engineering (4)
- Matthieu Beck – choir (1–2)
- Alisia Casper – sleeve
- Joe Carvell – double bass (1, 10)
- Chris A. Cummings – electric piano (7), drum machine (7), backing vocals (7)
- Bo Kondren – mastering
- Julie Gasnier – choir (2, 10), vocals (3, 9)
- Mason Le Long – guitar (1), lead guitar (6)
- Vicente Machado – drums (4)
- Emma Mario – percussion (1, 9), keys (1, 9), steel drum (1), drums (2–3, 5, 9), bongos (2), electronics (6), Animoog (6), vocals (1, 7–9), keys (9), claps (9), vocal arrangements (9), synths (10), choir (1–2, 4, 10), mixing
- Martalina and the Finnish Au Pair choir, vocals (9)
- Rob Mazurek – coronet (3)
- Marcelo Machado Mendonça – guitar (4)
- Marie Merlet – choir (1–2, 10)
- Phil M FU – electronics (5), keys (5, 3), synths (3)
- Jose Missionario – bass (4)
- Chiquinho Moreira – electronics (1), keys (4), effects (4)
- Xavi Munoz – bass (2–3, 6–9), vocals and claps (9)
- Jeff Parker – vocal arrangements (2, 10)
- Armelle Pioline – choir (1–2, 10), vocals (3, 9)
- Nina Savary – choir (1–2, 4, 10), vocals (3, 7–9)
- Felipe Souza – voice and guitar (4)
- Alexis Taylor – voice (3)
- David Thayer – choir (1), organs (2, 7–8), synths (2), pianoline and piano (2), cymbals (2), flute (6–8), keys (6), bass pedals (6)
- Joe Watson – choir (1), vocal arrangements (1, 9), synth (3), keys and bass (5)
