= Captain Easychord =

EP by Stereolab
- Released: 30 July 2001
- Length: 21:44
- Label: Duophonic

Stereolab chronology
| The First of the Microbe Hunters (2000) | Captain Easychord (2001) | Sound-Dust (2001) |

Professional ratings
Review scores
| Source | Rating |
|---|---|
| Allmusic | 3/5 stars |

Captain Easychord is a July 2001 EP by Stereolab. It was released on CD and 12" vinyl one month prior to the album Sound-Dust. "Moodles" is included on the Japanese version of the Sound-Dust album as a bonus track. The album version of the title track has two musically distinct sections and lasts 5:33; the EP version comprises only the first section, fading out shortly before the transition to the second.

All four tracks were later re-released on the Oscillons from the Anti-Sun compilation.

== Track listing ==
All tracks by Tim Gane and Laetitia Sadier

1. "Captain Easychord" – 2:55
2. "Long Life Love" – 7:08
3. "Canned Candies" – 4:15
4. "Moodles" – 7:26

== Personnel ==
- Stereolab – Engineer, Mixing
