= Super-Electric =

EP by Stereolab
- Released: 30 September 1991
- Length: 21:18
- Label: Too Pure
- Producers: Robbs; Paul Tipler; Stereolab

Stereolab chronology
Super 45 (1991)	Super-Electric (1991)	Peng! (1992)

Professional ratings
Review scores
Source	Rating
AllMusic	link

Super-Electric is the second EP by English-French rock band Stereolab, released in September 1991 by Too Pure. All four tracks were later included on Switched On.

== Track listing ==
1. "Super-Electric" – 5:22
2. "High Expectation" – 3:32
3. "The Way Will Be Opening" – 4:07
4. "Contact" – 8:17

== Cover versions ==
- The Flowers of Hell released a string & brass reworking of the song "Super-Electric" on their 2012 covers album Odes.

== Personnel ==
Stereolab

- Seaya Sadier – vocals
- Tim Gane – guitars, Moog, Farfisa
- Martin Kean – bass
- Joe Dilworth – drums
- Gina Morris – second vocals (tracks 1, 3)

Production

- Robbs – producer (tracks 1, 4)
- Paul Tipler – producer (tracks 2, 3), engineer (all)
- Stereolab – producer (all)
- Antonholz Portmann – artwork
