= The Free Design (EP) =

EP by Stereolab
- Released: 6 September 1999
- Genre: Art pop
- Label: Duophonic
- Producer: 17:26

Stereolab chronology
| Aluminum Tunes: Switched On, Vol. 3 (1998) | The Free Design (1999) | Cobra and Phases Group Play Voltage in the Milky Night (1999) |

Professional ratings
Review scores
| Source | Rating |
|---|---|
| AllMusic | link |

The Free Design is a September 1999 EP by the group Stereolab which served as the lead single from their sixth full-length studio album, Cobra and Phases Group Play Voltage in the Milky Night. All four of its tracks were later re-released on the Oscillons from the Anti-Sun compilation. The title of the EP and song was taken from the '60s pop group The Free Design.

The 12" and CD formats were classed as a budget album for chart purposes, and peaked at number 6 on the UK Budget Albums chart. The two-track 7" format appeared separately on the UK Singles chart at number 157.

== Track listing ==
1. "The Free Design" – 3:46
2. "Escape Pod (From the World of Medical Observations)" – 3:57
3. "With Friends Like These" – 5:49
4. "Les Aimes des Memes" – 3:54
