= Sound-Dust =

Studio album by Stereolab
- Released: 28 August 2001
- Recorded: October 2000 – February 2001
- Studios: Soma (Chicago, Illinois)
- Genres: Experimental pop; post-rock; lounge
- Length: 62:54
- Languages: English; French
- Labels: Duophonic; Elektra
- Producers: John McEntire; Jim O'Rourke

Stereolab chronology
Captain Easychord (2001)	Sound-Dust (2001)	ABC Music (2002)

Singles from Sound-Dust
- 1. "Captain Easychord" Released: 30 July 2001; 2. "Baby Lulu" Released: 8 October 2019

Professional ratings
Aggregate scores
Source	Rating
Metacritic	71/100
Review scores
Source	Rating
AllMusic	3.5/5 stars
Alternative Press	7/10
Blender	3/5 stars
Entertainment Weekly	B−
Mojo	4/5 stars
Pitchfork	7.4/10
Q	4/5 stars
Rolling Stone	3.5/5 stars
Spin	6/10
Uncut	9/10

Sound-Dust is the seventh studio album by English-French rock band Stereolab. It was released on 28 August 2001 in North America by Elektra Records and on 3 September 2001 internationally by Duophonic Records. The album was produced by John McEntire and Jim O'Rourke and recorded at McEntire's Chicago studio Soma. It was Stereolab's last album to feature singer and guitarist Mary Hansen, who died in a biking accident the following year.

The first 1,200 copies of both the CD and LP issues of Sound-Dust were packaged with a handmade book sleeve. A remastered and expanded edition of the album was released by Duophonic and Warp on 29 November 2019.

The song "Nothing to Do with Me" features lyrics derived from English satirist Chris Morris' TV series Jam.

== Track listing ==
All tracks are written by Tim Gane and Lætitia Sadier, except where noted.

No.	Title	Writer(s)	Length
1.	"Black Ants in Sound-Dust"		1:57
2.	"Space Moth"		7:33
3.	"Captain Easychord"		5:23
4.	"Baby Lulu"		5:12
5.	"The Black Arts"		5:11
6.	"Hallucinex"		3:48
7.	"Double Rocker"		5:31
8.	"Gus the Mynah Bird"		6:07
9.	"Naught More Terrific Than Man"		4:02
10.	"Nothing to Do with Me"	Gane; Sadier; Chris Morris	3:35
11.	"Suggestion Diabolique"		7:52
12.	"Les Bons Bons des Raisons"		6:43
Total length:			62:54

- On the expanded edition, "Gus the Mynah Bird" is extended to 9:05.

Japanese edition
No.	Title	Writer(s)	Length
6.	"Moodles"		7:23
7.	"Hallucinex"		3:48
8.	"Double Rocker"		5:31
9.	"Gus the Mynah Bird"		6:07
10.	"Naught More Terrific Than Man"		4:02
11.	"Nothing to Do with Me"	Gane; Sadier; Morris	3:35
12.	"Suggestion Diabolique"		7:52
13.	"Les Bons Bons des Raisons"		6:43
Total length:			70:17

2019 expanded edition bonus disc
No.	Title	Length
1.	"Black Ants" (demo)	1:43
2.	"Spacemoth Intro" (demo)	0:33
3.	"Spacemoth" (demo)	3:44
4.	"Baby Lulu" (demo)	3:19
5.	"Hallucinex Pt 1" (demo)	2:07
6.	"Hallucinex Pt 2" (demo)	0:51
7.	"Long Live Love" (demo)	2:18
8.	"Les Bon Bons des Raisons" (demo)	3:23
Total length:		17:58

== Personnel ==
Credits are adapted from the album's liner notes.

Stereolab

- Tim Gane – acoustic and electric guitars, piano, Pianet, Rhodes, Rock-Si-Chord, and Wurlitzer pianos, clavinet, electric harpsichord, Farfisa organ, celesta, electronics, tape echo and delay
- Lætitia Sadier – vocals, percussion, whistling, sound effects
- Mary Hansen – vocals, percussion, whistling, sound effects
- Simon Johns – six-string bass
- Andy Ramsay – drums

Additional musicians

- Tim Barnes – bongo drum on "Gus the Mynahbird"
- Jeb Bishop – trombone
- Dave Max Crawford – trumpet
- Mikael Jorgensen – electric harpsichord, Rhodes piano
- Glenn Kotche – crotales on "Captain Easychord" and "Gus the Mynahbird", marimba on "Gus the Mynahbird"
- Rob Mazurek – cornet on "Captain Easychord" and "Gus the Mynahbird"
- John McEntire – piano, Pianet, Rhodes, Rock-Si-Chord, and Wurlitzer pianos, clavinet, electric harpsichord, Farfisa organ, celesta, vibraphone, marimba, glockenspiel, electronics, tape echo and delay, percussion, whistling, sound effects
- Paul Mertens – flute, bass harmonica
- Sean O'Hagan – acoustic and electric guitars, piano, Pianet, Rhodes, Rock-Si-Chord, and Wurlitzer pianos, clavinet, electric harpsichord, Farfisa organ, celesta, brass and flute arrangements
- Jim O'Rourke – acoustic and electric guitars, piano, Pianet, Rhodes, Rock-Si-Chord, and Wurlitzer pianos, clavinet, electric harpsichord, Farfisa organ, celesta, vibraphone, marimba, glockenspiel, electronics, tape echo and delay
- Andy Robinson – brass and flute arrangements
- Chad Taylor – cymbals on "The Black Arts", drums on "Nothing to Do with Me"

Production

- Mike Jorgensen – computer assistance
- Jeremy Lemos – additional engineering
- John McEntire – engineering, mixing
- Jim O'Rourke – engineering, mixing
- Steve Rooke – mastering
- Stereolab (credited as "The Groop") – mixing

Design

- House – design

== Charts ==
Chart (2001)	Peak position
Scottish Albums (Official Charts)	90
UK Albums (Official Charts)	117
UK Independent Albums (Official Charts)	17
US Billboard 200	178
US Heatseekers Albums (Billboard)	11
