= Pearl and the Oysters =

French-American indie pop duo

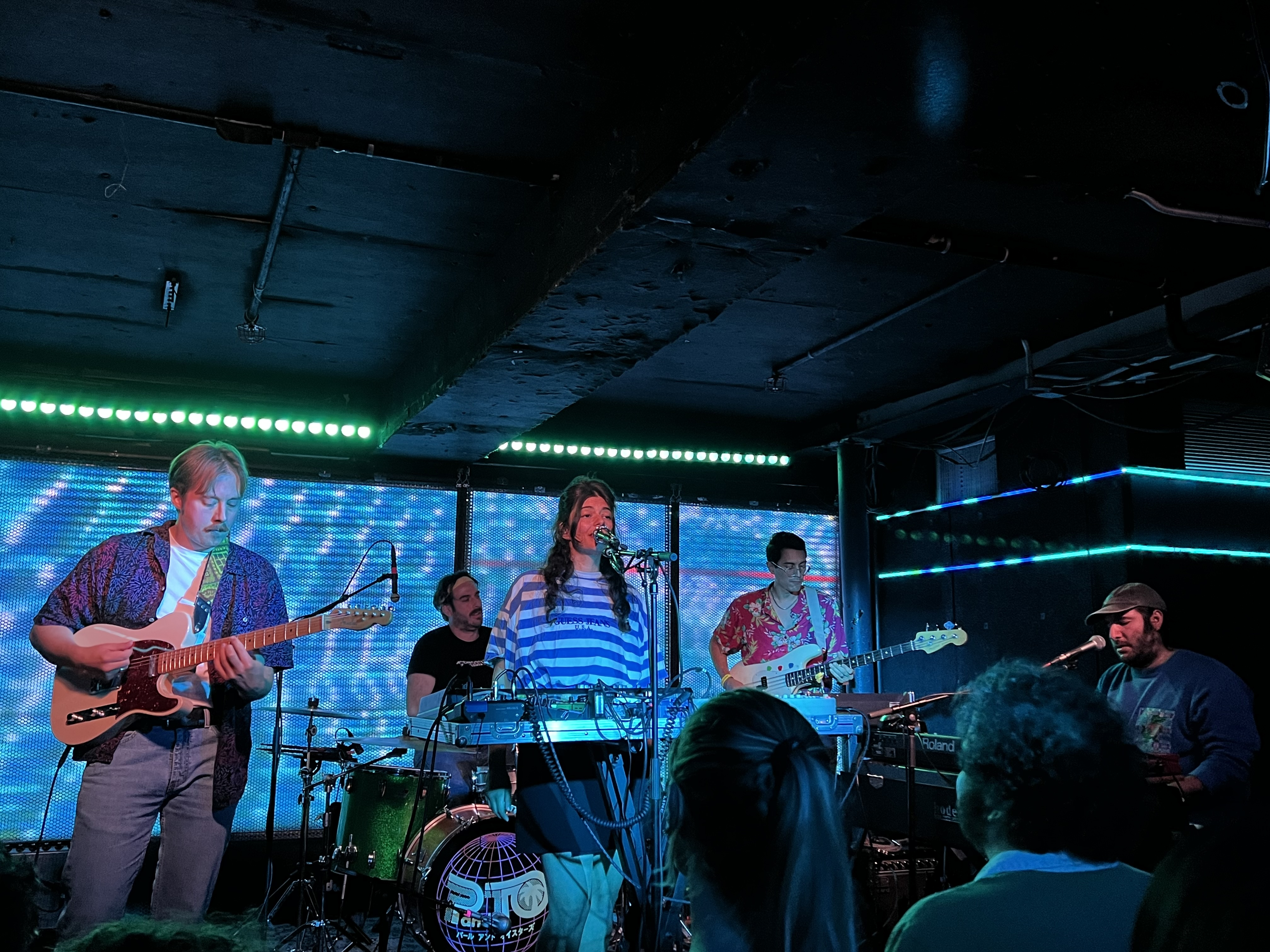
- Pearl and the Oysters performing in 2024

Background information
- Origin: Paris, France; Gainesville, Florida / Los Angeles, U.S.
- Genres: Indie pop; alternative rock; dream pop; psychedelic pop
- Years active: 2015–present
- Label: Stones Throw Records
- Members: Juliette Pearl Davis; Joachim Polack
- Website: www.pearlandtheoysters.com

Pearl & the Oysters is a French-American indie pop duo formed by Juliette Pearl Davis and Joachim Polack. The group originated in Paris, later relocating to Gainesville, Florida, and then to Los Angeles. Their music blends elements of indie pop, synth-pop, dream pop, and 1960s/1970s-inspired sounds.

== History ==
Davis and Polack met during high school in Paris and began collaborating musically. They later moved to the United States, where they became part of Gainesville’s independent music scene. After moving to the U.S., Polack began a Ph.D. in musicology focused on Brazilian popular music at the University of Florida School of Music. In 2020, they relocated to Los Angeles.

== Artistry ==
Style

The band's musical style is often described as an eclectic fusion of space-age pop, soft rock, and jazz influences, characterized by lush arrangements and a dreamy atmosphere. Their songwriting often evokes nostalgic moods while maintaining a contemporary indie sensibility.

Influences

Juliette and Joachim met on their first day of high school in Paris, sharing a passion for music and artists like Burt Bacharach, Kurt Weill, and Antônio Carlos Jobim. Also American band such as The Beach Boys to the Japanese group Yellow Magic Orchestra.

== Career and releases ==
Their self-titled debut album was released in 2017. Subsequent releases include Canned Music (2018), Flowerland (2021), Coast 2 Coast (2023), and Planet Pearl (2024). They have released music under labels such as Feeltrip Records and Stones Throw Records.

== Collaborations ==
The duo has collaborated with musicians including Lætitia Sadier of Stereolab and Riley Geare of Unknown Mortal Orchestra. These collaborations have been noted in critical discussions of their evolving sound.

== Band members ==
- Juliette Pearl Davis – vocals, flute, synthesizers
- Joachim Polack – keyboards, production
  Juliette & the Oysters performing live at SXSW in 2019
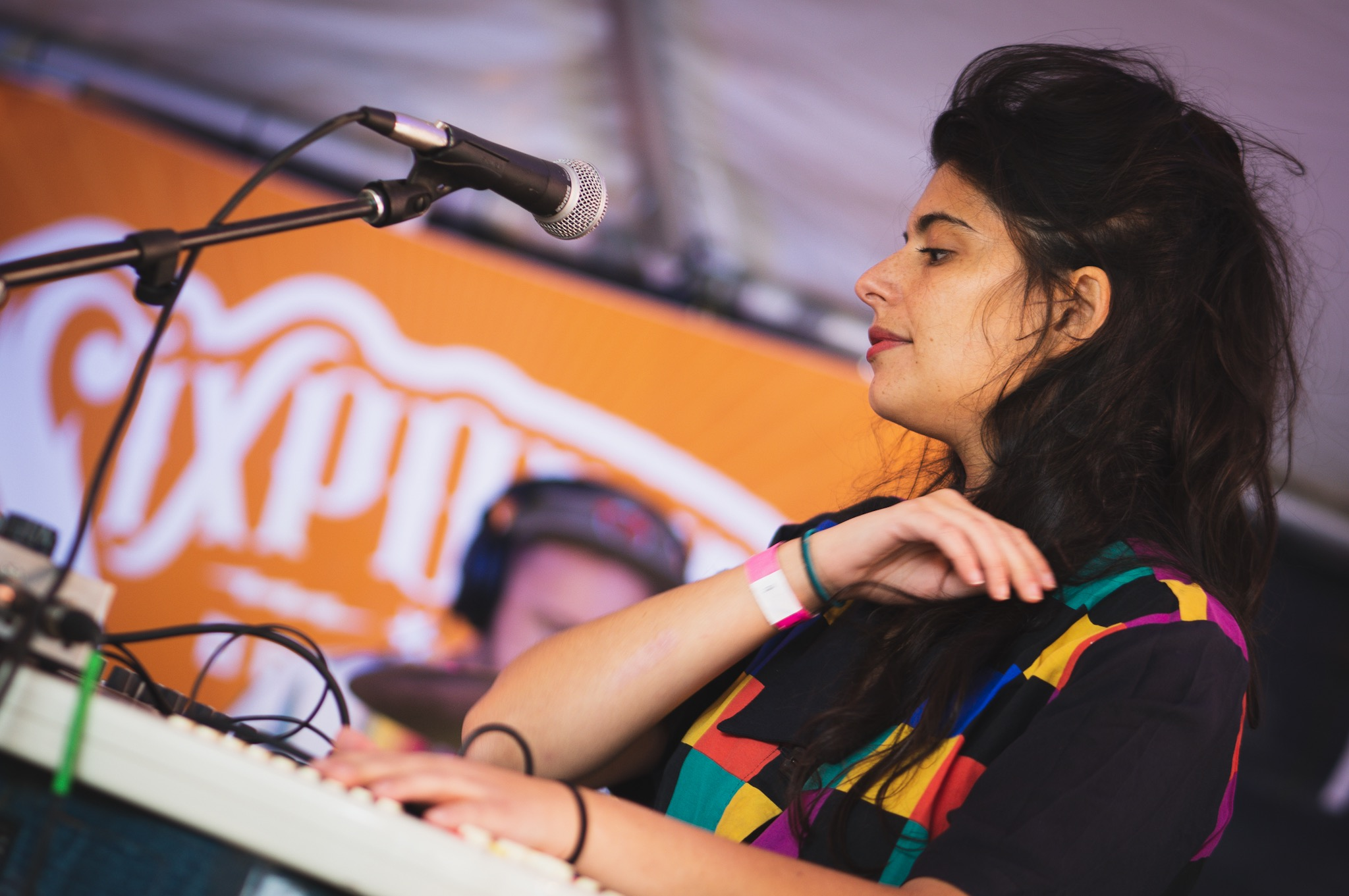
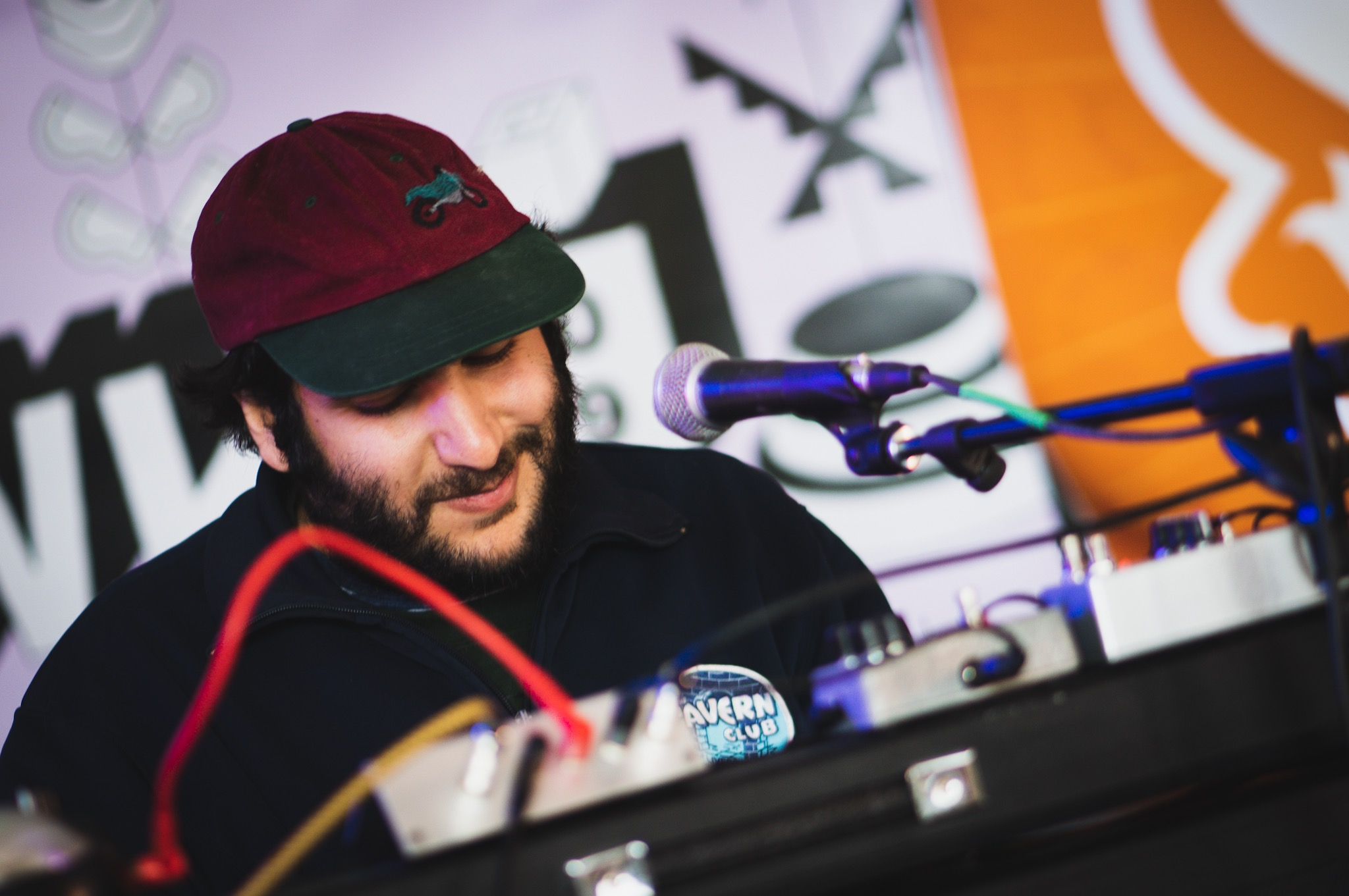
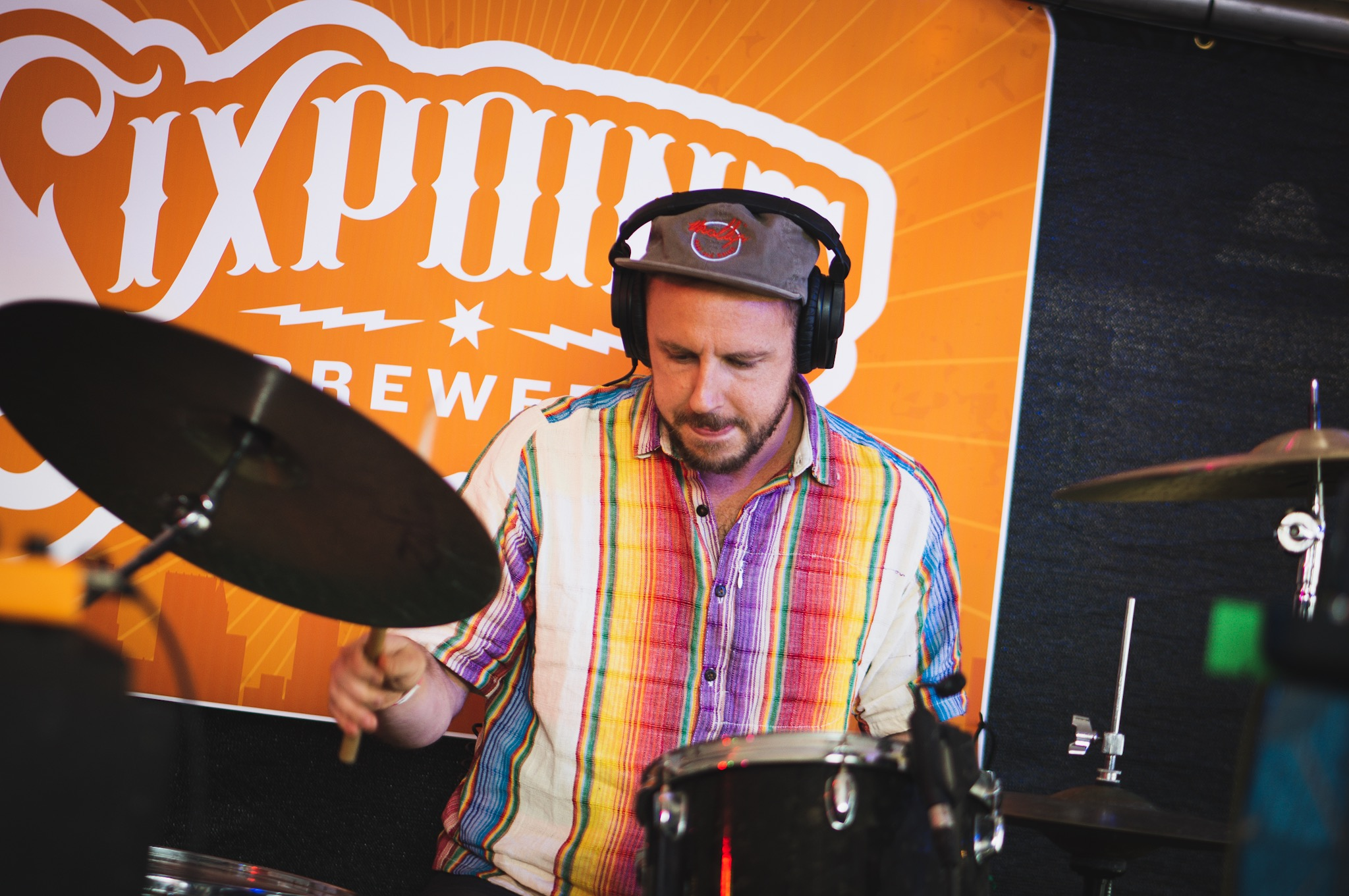
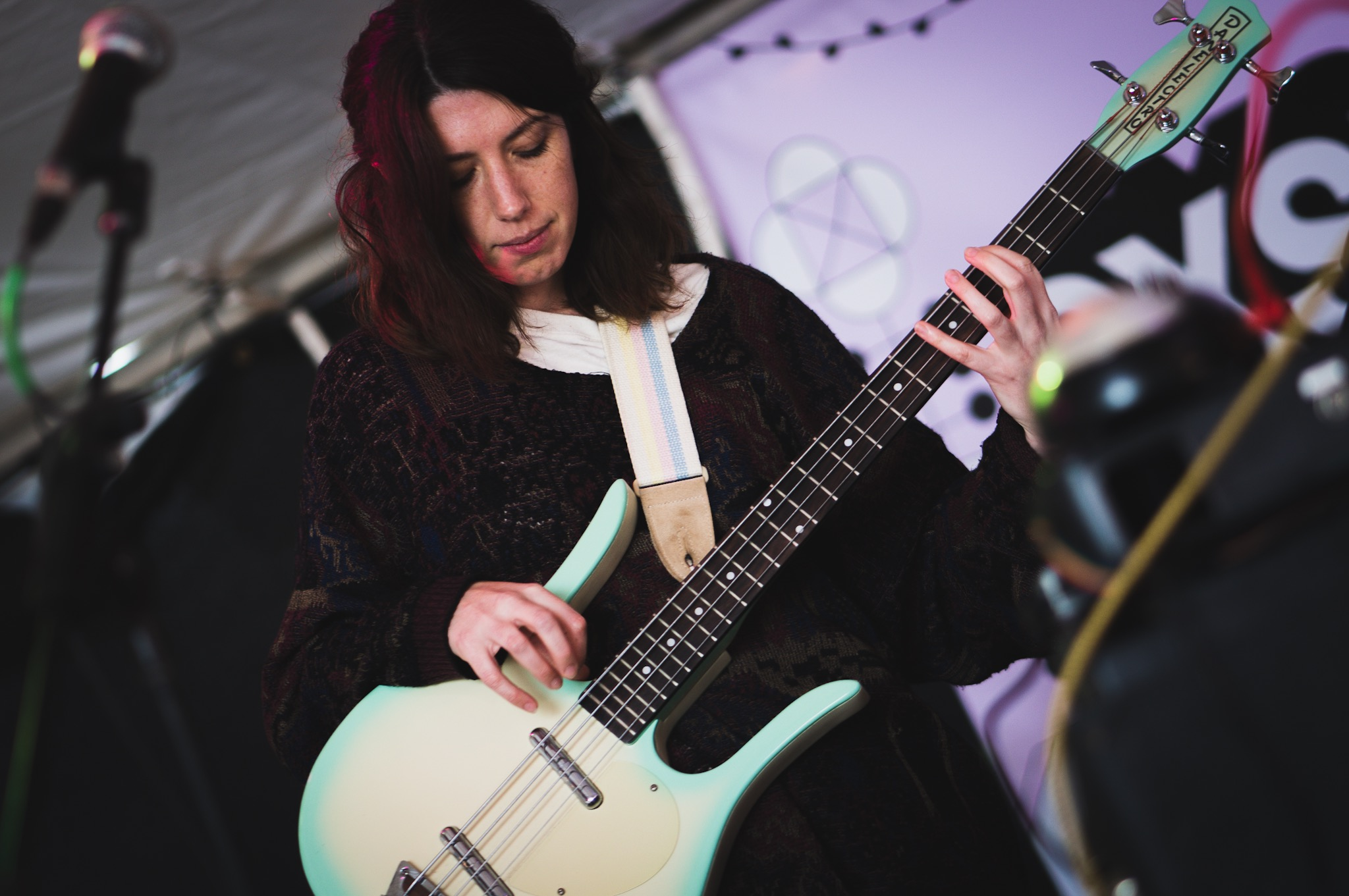
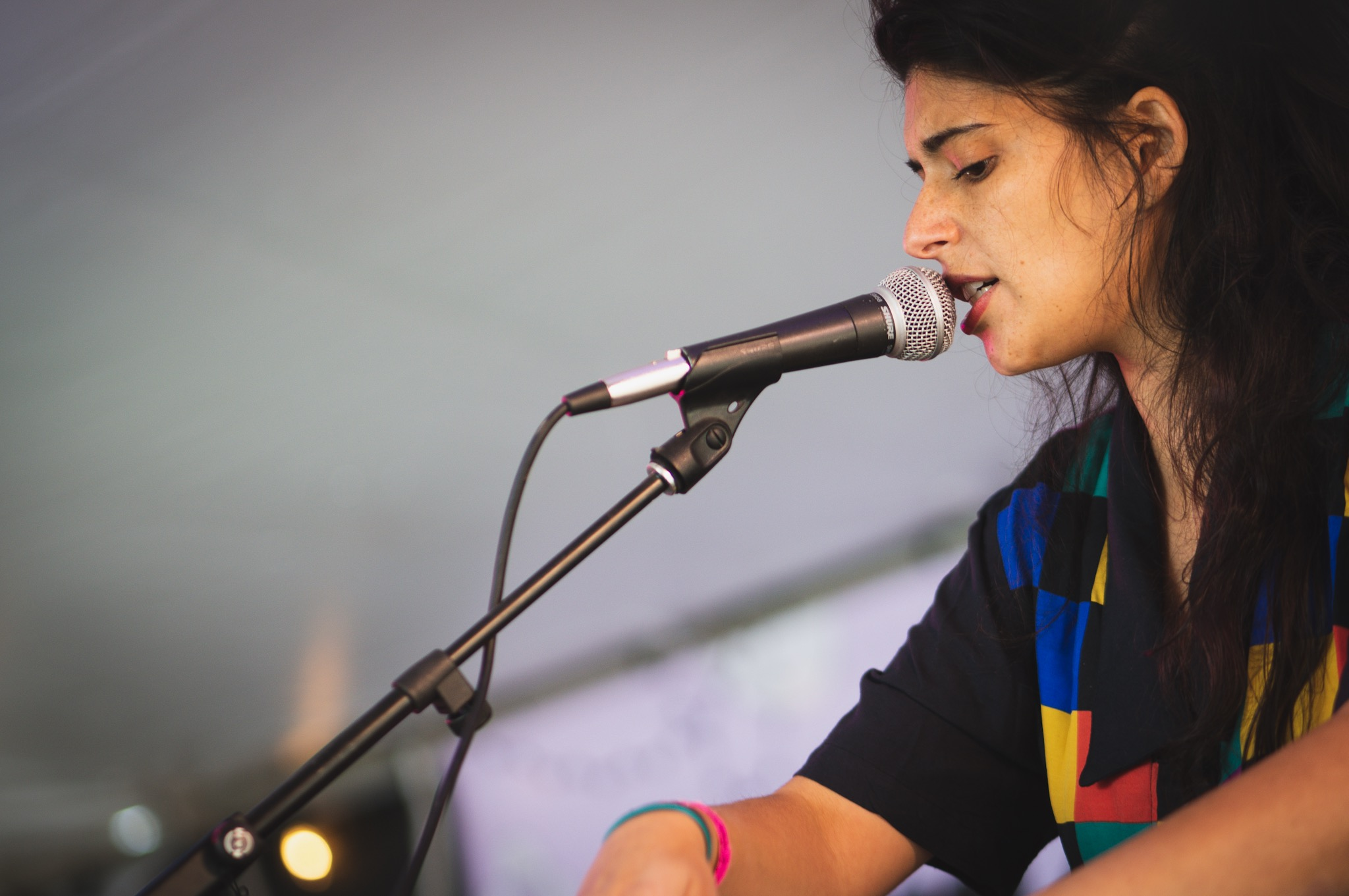
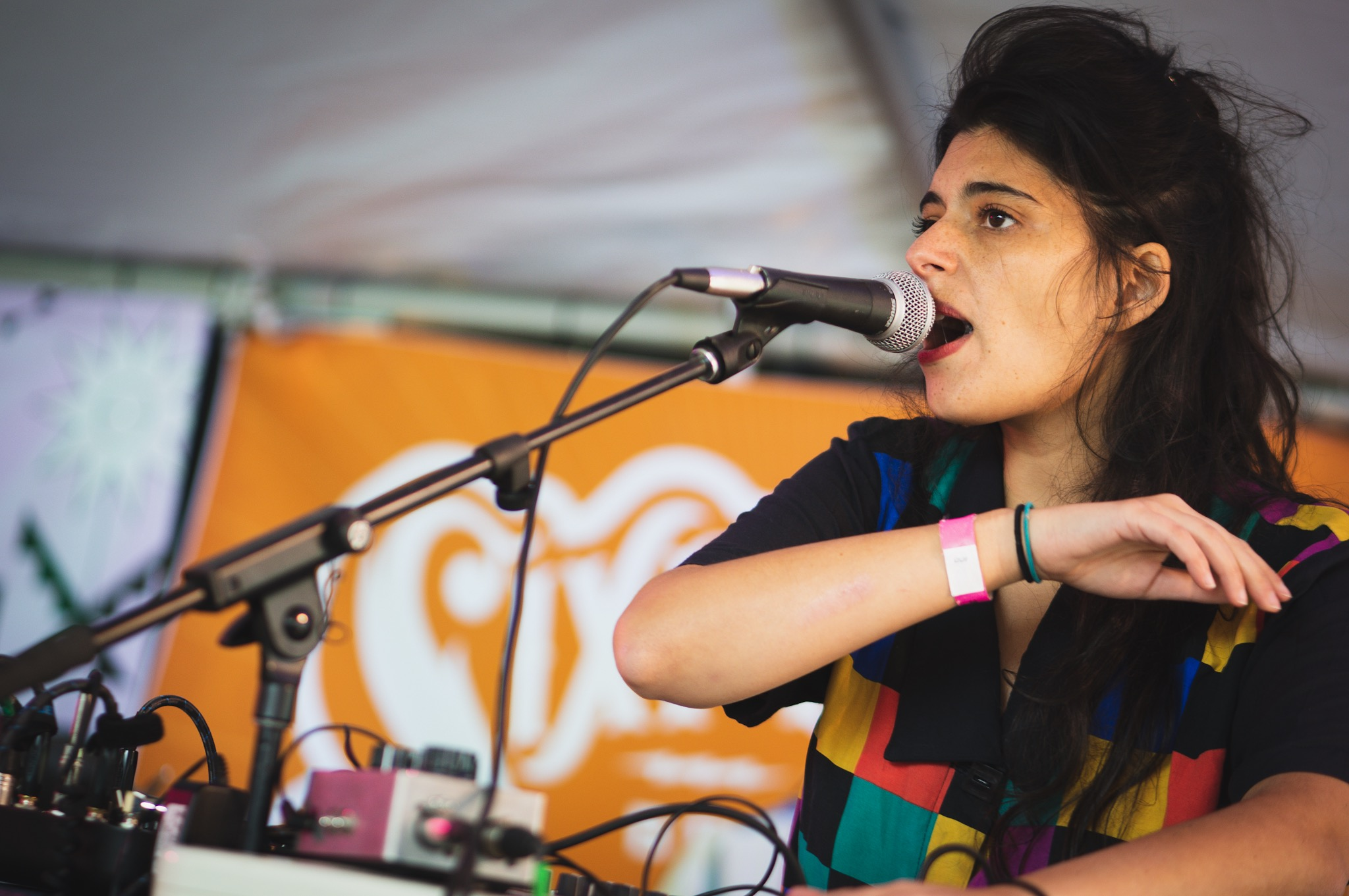

== Discography ==
=== Studio albums ===
- Pearl and the Oysters (2017)
- Canned Music (2018)
- Flowerland (2021)
- Coast 2 Coast (2023)
- Planet Pearl (2024)
- Monkey Mind (2026)

=== Singles and EPs ===
- "Pacific Ave" (2022)
- "Konami" (2023)
- "Think of Rain" (2024)
- "Sous la lune mandarine" (2025)

== Critical reception ==
Publications such as Clash, Flood, and Wonderland have positively reviewed the band's work, noting their blend of retro styles with contemporary pop. Clash referred to their sound as “space-age pop folded with soft rock and jazz influences.”

== See also ==
- Indie pop – Genre of pop music
- Dream pop – Music genre
