= Monade =

French band, side project of Lætitia Sadier

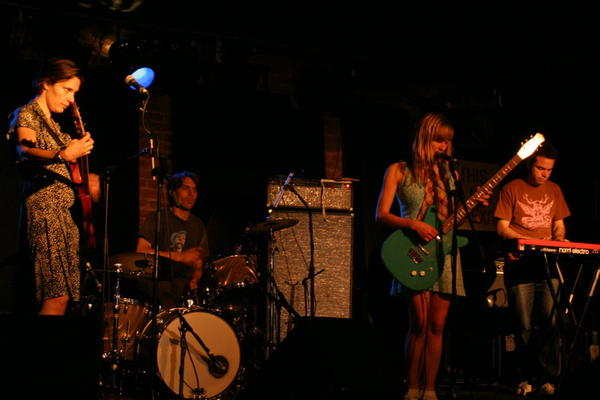
- Monade performing in 2008

Background information
- Origin: Bordeaux, France
- Genres: Post-rock; dream pop
- Years active: 1996–2009
- Labels: Duophonic; Too Pure
- Spinoff of: Stereolab
- Past members: Lætitia Sadier; Marie Merlet; Nicolas Etienne; Xavier Chabellard

Monade were a French post-rock band which was initially a side project of Lætitia Sadier, a founding member of Stereolab. In 2009, Sadier retired the project name and began performing under her own name.

== History ==
In the late 1990s, the All-City imprint released a 7" split of Monade's "Ode to a Keyring"/"Witch Hazel" [the a-side of the split featured materials by post-rock group, M, featuring David Pajo of Slint. These songs were recorded by Sadier with Rosie Cuckston of the band Pram. The two songs featured on Monade's initial 45 were re-recorded for the group's first full-length record, Socialisme Ou Barbarie [Drag City]. They have released two albums to date on the Duophonic label which is partially owned by Sadier herself. The first album, Socialisme ou Barbarie: The Bedroom Recordings was released in 2003 after being produced part-time over a period of six years.

Their second album, A Few Steps More (2005), marks a more cohesive stage in the band's development. There is now a regular lineup, and it was recorded using studio equipment. The album has been roundly praised and criticised for its superficial resemblance to the sound of Stereolab, but several reviews have commented more on the harmonic structure of the album, which almost seems to blend symphonically at times. Asked about on the album's themes in an interview for Eye Weekly, Sadier commented: "I was trying to write to the individual and the capacity to listen to one's desires. Also, I tackled the idea of becoming. I think that's quite an important notion: that things should be allowed to become. I became a singer and it took me years and I want Monade to have a chance to become a band."

The name "Monade" was taken from Cornelius Castoriadis' concept of the "monade psychique" (psychical monad), which was the term Castoriadis used to describe the undifferentiated infantile psyche, before its shattering into the ego, super-ego, and id through the process of socialization. Lætitia Sadier has stated that the name has a double meaning – the word "monade" is from the root word "mono-" (meaning "one") and etymologically related to the sound recording term "mono", which stands in contrast to stereo, and therefore is a reference to Monade as a solo side project to Stereolab. The title of Monade's first album pays tribute to a libertarian Marxist political group founded by Castoriadis, Socialisme ou Barbarie.

In March 2008, a new Monade album was released, without any promotion, called Monstre Cosmic.

On September 19, 2009 at The BirdCage in London, it was announced that it was Laetitia's last performance under the name Monade. Laetitia played a selection of new solo songs.

== Discography ==
- 2003: Socialisme ou Barbarie: The Bedroom Recordings
- 2005: A Few Steps More
- 2008: Monstre Cosmic
