= Chris A. Cummings =

Canadian musician

Chris A. Cummings (born 29 May 1969), known professionally as Marker Starling (and formerly as Mantler), is a Canadian songwriter and musician.

== Early career ==
Born in Toronto, Cummings studied classical piano from age 7 to age 20, and wrote songs of his own as a 7-year-old which were preserved by his parents on cassette tape. After studying Film Production at Toronto's York University, Cummings started writing and recording songs in his late twenties. His debut album, Doin' It All (Le Systeme Records) appeared in 2000. Produced by James Duncan, the album featured only Wurlitzer electric piano, drum machine and voice, and was characterized by Allmusic as "fragile and highly evocative".

== The Tomlab years (2002–10) ==
Mantler's second album, Sadisfaction, was released on Germany's Tomlab label in October 2002. Although receiving little attention at the time, it did garner a Pitchfork review, which, while noting the contrast of elements (the "defiantly tinny drum machine" versus the "ultra-naturalistic cool jazz trumpet" in the song "Hoped-For Chance"), ultimately felt that the album was weighed down by its "unrelieved gloom." This was followed by his third album Landau (2004), which was called "casio pop of the highest order" by Almost Cool., while XLR8R called its "lounge-crooning soul" an "acquired taste."

== Monody and Tin Angel (2010) ==
After a lengthy gestation period, Mantler's fourth record, Monody, was released by Tomlab and UK-based Tin Angel Records in May 2010. Largely produced by longtime collaborator Zack G, the album also featured production contributions from Leon Taheny (Final Fantasy, Bruce Peninsula) and Jeremy Greenspan (Junior Boys), who named Cummings as "the best songwriter in Canada," as well as brass arrangements by Owen Pallett. A mixture of solo, electronic-based and acoustic band recordings. the album was noted by The Line of Best Fit for not being "an album that was designed to leap out at the listener," but which did have some "buried musical treasures." Exclaim! pronounced it to be "teeming with slow jams", while NOW called it "outsider easy listening music" that was "both cool and uncool" and mentioned that Cummings had "long felt like a Toronto music scene secret".

== Marker Starling (2012–present) ==
Following an appearance at South by Southwest in 2010, Cummings shot the video for the song "Breaking Past the Day" in Austin, Texas with director Colin Medley. In 2011 Cummings was invited by TIFF Bell Lightbox to curate a film program for their Free Screen series, "Mantler's Visual Music", which included a live performance. In 2012 Cummings opened for Yo La Tengo at the Toronto Underground Cinema as part of the Images Festival. In 2013 the video for the song "Author", directed by Álvaro Giron, was praised by music writer Carl Wilson, who noted the song lyrics' "acrobatic" quality. In 2015, Cummings released his first album under his new band name Marker Starling, Rosy Maze, which was praised by Matthew Horton in the NME for its "timeless quality." This was followed in 2016 by the all-covers record I'm Willing, which Peter Ellman in Exclaim! noted for its "mellow, Sunday afternoon […] feel." In 2017 Cummings' third album as Marker Starling, Anchors and Ampersands, was released, leading AllMusic's Tim Sendra to proclaim it "truly a treat for lovers of soft pop." 2018 saw the release of "Trust An Amateur", featuring the single "Fly Away", the official video of which features the animation work of OCAD professor Isaac King. In 2019, Cummings provided the singing voice of Desmond in the anime television series Carole & Tuesday, with attribution given to Marker Starling. April 2020 saw the release of Cummings' 9th studio album "High January", described by AllMusic as ..."another satisfying album from an artist who has done nothing but make them one after another."

== Collaborations ==
Cummings contributed arrangements and wurlitzer to the song "First and Last" on Maylee Todd's 2013 album Escapology. His wurlitzer also appears on Junior Boys' 2009 song "Hazel" from the album Begone Dull Care, and Devon Sproule's 2011 song "The Warning Bell" from the album I Love You, Go Easy. He also served as a musical director for the Canadia dell'Arte Theatre Troupe between 1998 and 2002. His voice and lyrics were featured on four songs ("Try Though We Might", "Chain of Command", "Breaking Formation" and "One Human Minute") on Von Spar's Streetlife (2014). He contributed Wurlitzer backing to another Junior Boys track in their 2016 cover of Bobby Caldwell's "What You Won't Do For Love." On I'm Willing (2016) he performed duets with both Laetitia Sadier (of Stereolab) and Nina Savary. He contributed a song, "Deep Background" to Find Me Finding You by Laetitia Sadier Source Ensemble (2017). He played keyboards in the bands Matias (2005-2010) and Hank (2007-present), for which he also provided string arrangements on the records The Luck of the Singers (2009) and Showers of Happiness (2015).

== Discography ==
=== Albums ===
- Doin' It All (Le Systeme, 2000)
- Sadisfaction (Tomlab, 2002)
- Landau (Tomlab, 2004)
- Monody (Tomlab/Tin Angel/Blocks Recording Club, 2010)
- Rosy Maze (Tin Angel, 2015)
- I'm Willing (Tin Angel, 2016 - covers album)
- Anchors & Ampersands (Tin Angel, 2017)
- Trust An Amateur (Tin Angel, 2018)
- High January (Tin Angel, 2020)
- Diamond Violence (Tin Angel, 2022)

=== EPs ===
- Childman (Tin Angel, 2009)
- I Guarantee You A Good Time (Tin Angel, 2011)

=== Compilations ===
- Fortune Smiled Again (Windbell, 2011)
