= Aluminum Tunes =

Compilation album by Stereolab
- Released: 20 October 1998
- Recorded: April 1994 – August 1997
- Genre: Experimental rock
- Length: 113:12
- Labels: Drag City (US); Warp (UK)

Stereolab chronology
Simple Headphone Mind (1997)	Aluminum Tunes (1998)	The Free Design (1999)

Stereolab Switched On chronology
Refried Ectoplasm (1995)	Aluminum Tunes (1998)	Electrically Possessed (2021)

Professional ratings
Review scores
Source	Rating
AllMusic	4.5/5 stars
Pitchfork	7.0/10 (1998); 8.5/10 (2018)

Aluminum Tunes is a double album collection of EPs and rarities from Stereolab, released in 1998. It is the third compilation in a series of rarities collections following Switched On and Refried Ectoplasm, and was stickered with the subtitle Switched On, Volume 3.

== Track listing ==
=== CD 1 ===
1. "Pop Quiz" – 4:22 (from the 1995 Music for the Amorphous Body Study Center EP)
2. "The Extension Trip" – 3:43 (from the 1995 Music for the Amorphous Body Study Center EP)
3. "How to Play Your Internal Organs Overnight" – 3:58 (from the 1995 Music for the Amorphous Body Study Center EP)
4. "The Brush Descends the Length" – 3:08 (from the 1995 Music for the Amorphous Body Study Center EP)
5. "Melochord Seventy-Five" – 3:39 (from the 1995 Music for the Amorphous Body Study Center EP)
6. "Space Moment" – 4:20 (from the 1995 Music for the Amorphous Body Study Center EP. Also includes the unlisted track, an instrumental reprise of "The Extension Trip", that followed "Space Moment" on the original EP)
7. "Iron Man" – 3:27 (from the 1997 "Iron Man" single)
8. "The Long Hair of Death" – 4:48 (from the 1995 split single with Yo La Tengo)
9. "You Used to Call Me Sadness" – 4:00 (from the 1996 split single with Füxa, on Lissy's Records)
10. "New Orthophony" (full version) – 6:26 (the version on Mars Audiac Quintet is 4:34)
11. "Speedy Car" – 5:00 (from the 1996 split single with Tortoise)
12. "Golden Atoms" – 5:18 (recorded June 1995, also known as "Aluminum Tune" from the 1998 "The In Sound" single)
13. "Ulan Bator" – 3:14 (from the 1994 Mars Audiac Quintet bonus disc)
14. "One Small Step" – 4:16 (from the 1996 Laminations EP)

=== CD 2 ===
1. "One Note Samba / Surfboard" (full version) – Stereolab + Herbie Mann – 9:10 (the version on Red Hot + Rio is 7:18)
2. "Cadriopo" – 3:09 (from the 1996 Laminations EP)
3. "Klang Tone" – 5:36 (from the 1994 Mars Audiac Quintet bonus disc)
4. "Get Carter" – 3:23
5. "1000 Miles an Hour" – 4:32 (from the 1998 "The In Sound" single)
6. "Percolations" – 3:22 (from the 1996 split single with Faust and Foetus)
7. "Seeperbold" – 5:08
8. "Check and Double Check" – 4:03 (from the 1996 Laminations EP)
9. "Munich Madness" – 3:48 (also known as "Blue Milk" from the 1998 "The In Sound" single)
10. "Metronomic Underground" (Wagon Christ Mix) – 7:51 (from the 1996 Laminations EP)
11. "The Incredible He Woman" – 3:31 (from the 1997 "Iron Man" single)
