= Mary Hansen =

Australian-born guitarist and singer

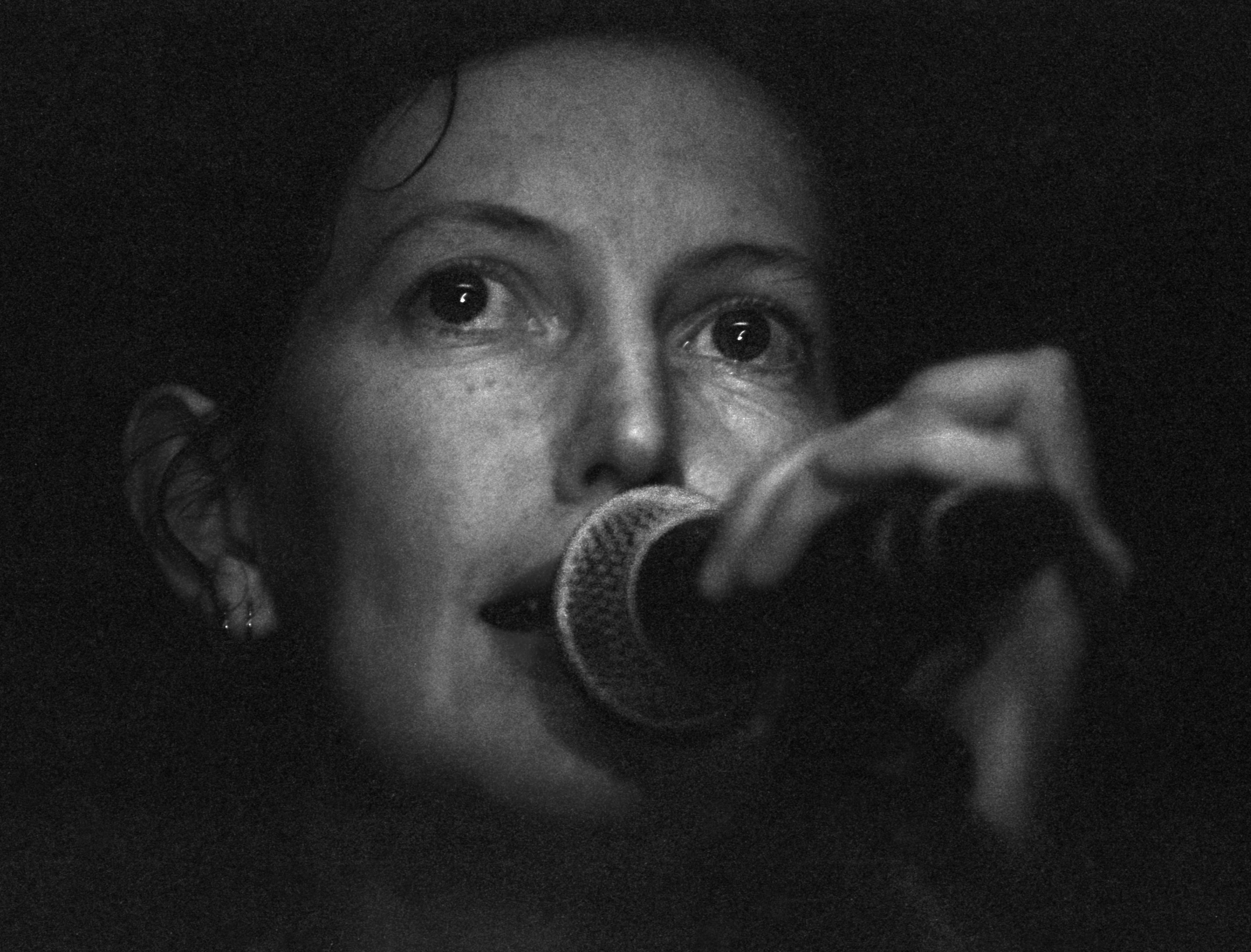
- Hansen in 1996

Background information
- Born: Mary Therese Hansen; 1 November 1966; Maryborough, Queensland, Australia
- Died: 9 December 2002 (aged 36) London, England
- Genres: Experimental pop; indie pop; experimental rock; psychedelic rock
- Occupations: Vocalist; musician
- Instruments: Vocals; guitar; percussion; keyboards
- Years active: 1986–2002
- Formerly of: The Wolfhounds; Stereolab; Schema

Mary Therese Hansen (1 November 1966 – 9 December 2002) was an Australian musician. She joined the London-based band Stereolab in 1992 as a singer, guitarist, keyboardist and percussionist, remaining a member of the group until her death.

In late 1999 she formed Schema with members of the Seattle-based band Hovercraft; they issued their debut album, Schema, on 19 September 2000. On 9 December 2002, Hansen was struck and killed by a truck while bicycling in London.

== Early life ==
Mary Therese Hansen was born on 1 November 1966 in Maryborough, Queensland, Australia. Her father, Brendan Hansen OAM (1922 – 1999), was a trade unionist and Australian Labor Party politician then serving as a Member of Parliament; and her mother, Moira Ann Hansen (née O'Sullivan), was a light opera singer. Hansen and her family were of Irish Catholic and Danish descent. Her parents were married at St Mary's Catholic Church, Maryborough in 1960. She was one of eight children, with three brothers (John, Tim and Gerry) and four sisters (Jenny, Maureen, Susie and Kate). Hansen was trained by her mother and entered eisteddfodau. She left secondary school at age 17 and worked in a bank.

== Career ==
By 1988, Hansen had moved to London and worked in various jobs. She soon became a backing singer with the Essex-based indie band the Wolfhounds. She met Tim Gane when the Wolfhounds performed alongside his band McCarthy. Gane formed Stereolab in 1990 with his then-partner Lætitia Sadier; Hansen joined Stereolab as second vocalist and guitarist in 1992. She also contributed percussion, keyboards, and occasional lead vocals. As a member of Stereolab, Hansen recorded six studio albums from Transient Random-Noise Bursts with Announcements (August 1993) to Sound-Dust (August 2001).

Outside of her work with Stereolab, Hansen sang on records by Brokeback, the High Llamas, Moonshake, and Mouse on Mars. She was a record producer, keyboard player and vocalist for the London underground group Chicano.

In late 1999, Hansen combined with Seattle-formed space rock group Hovercraft to form Schema. An eponymous maxi-EP/mini-album was released on 19 September 2000 on 5 Rue Christine. AllMusic's François Couture described their style as "space rock, psychedelic rock, ambient pop, and artsy avant-rock".

== Death ==
On 9 December 2002, a lorry truck driver hit and killed Hansen while she was cycling in London. Just before her death, she had bought a block of land in Maryborough, as she frequently spent time there with her family. Stereolab had bought land as well, to build a studio before her death. Their subsequent release, Margerine Eclipse (2004), was dedicated to Hansen, with its track "Feel and Triple" being a tribute to her.

In 2004, Hybird, an EP of some of Hansen's music, was released posthumously. It also featured her artwork, contained three tracks which had been released in limited editions before her death, and a final track which was finished by Stereolab's Andy Ramsay.
