= Tin Angel Records =

British independent record label

- Founded: 2007
- Country of origin: UK
- Location: United Kingdom
- Official website: tinangelrecords.com

Tin Angel Records is a British independent record label.

== History ==
Tin Angel Records has founded in 2007 with Devon Sproule's Keep Your Silver Shined. The album received critical acclaim and led to Sproule appearing live on Later... with Jools Holland. Other notable records for the label in 2007 were by Paul Curreri and Adrian Crowley, with Crowley's album Long Distance Swimmer receiving a nomination for the 2007 Choice Music Prize. In 2008, Tin Angel released the self-titled album by Polar Bear, the follow-up to their Mercury Music Prize-nominated Held on the Tips of Fingers. The label has since released records by the likes of Baby Dee, Charlie Parr and Evening Hymns (whose album Spectral Dusk was longlisted for the 2013 Polaris Music Prize) and branched into book publishing in 2012 with the release of Little Annie's autobiography You Can't Sing The Blues While Drinking Milk. Tin Angel hosted a showcase at North by Northeast 2013 in Toronto.

== Current roster ==
- Ed Askew
- Baby Dee
- Batsch
- Mich Cota/Kizis
- Crack Cloud
- Deliluh
- Ryan Driver
- Mabe Fratti
- Ian Daniel Kehoe
- Nicholas Krgovich
- Marker Starling
- Eliza Niemi
- N0V3L
- Opal Onyx
- Pick A Piper
- Sing Leaf
- John Southworth
- Devon Sproule
- Peter Zummo
