= Lætitia Sadier =

French singer (born 1968)

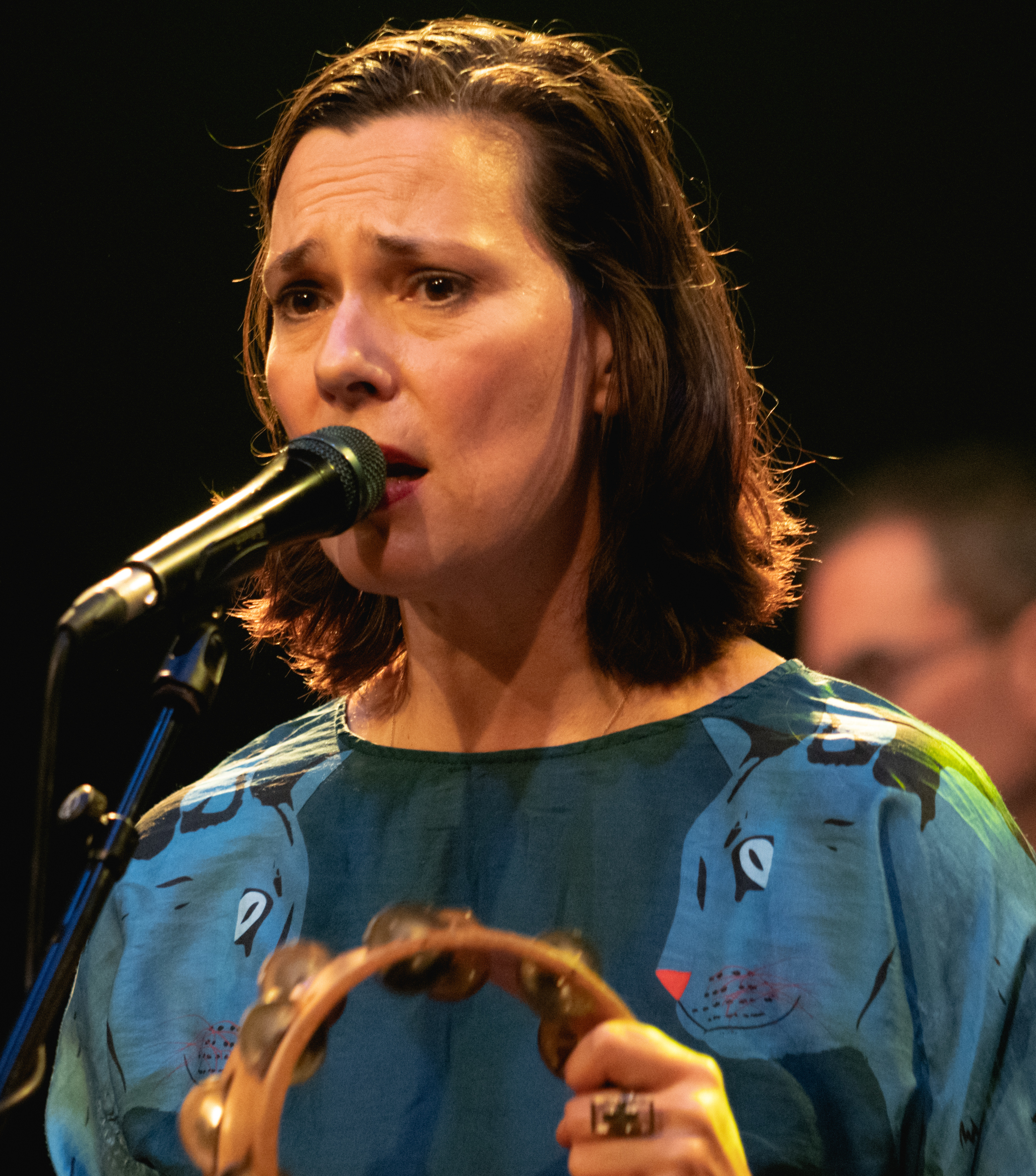
- Sadier in 2021

Background information
- Born: 6 May 1968 (age 58); Vincennes, France
- Genres: Post-rock; indie rock; dream pop
- Instruments: Vocals; synthesizers, guitar; keyboards; percussion; trombone
- Years active: 1987–present
- Member of: Stereolab
- Formerly of: Monade; McCarthy

Lætitia Sadier (born 6 May 1968), also known as Seaya Sadier, is a French musician best known as a founding member of the London-based avant-pop band Stereolab. She was born in the east of Paris and spent time in the US as a child. In 1996, while Stereolab was still active, she formed the side project Monade. In 2009 – the same year Stereolab became inactive – she ended the Monade project and began to perform solo work under her own name; her current band is known as the Lætitia Sadier Source Ensemble. She has frequently performed guest vocals and collaborations with other artists.

== Career ==
=== Stereolab ===
Sadier was working as a nanny when she met McCarthy guitarist Tim Gane at one of the band's Paris gigs during the late 1980s. She was disillusioned with the rock scene in France, and moved to London in 1989 to be with Gane and to pursue her career. She contributed vocals to McCarthy's final albums, and when McCarthy broke up in 1990, she and Gane immediately formed Stereolab.

For the first incarnation of the band, they enlisted ex-Chills bassist Martin Kean, drummer Joe Dilworth and Gina Morris on backing vocals. In 1993, the band were signed to the American major label Elektra. They were released from their recording contract in 2004. Sadier was the main contributor of lyrics, written in both English and French. In 2009, the group went into recording hiatus although they continue sporadically to play together live.

=== Monade and solo work ===
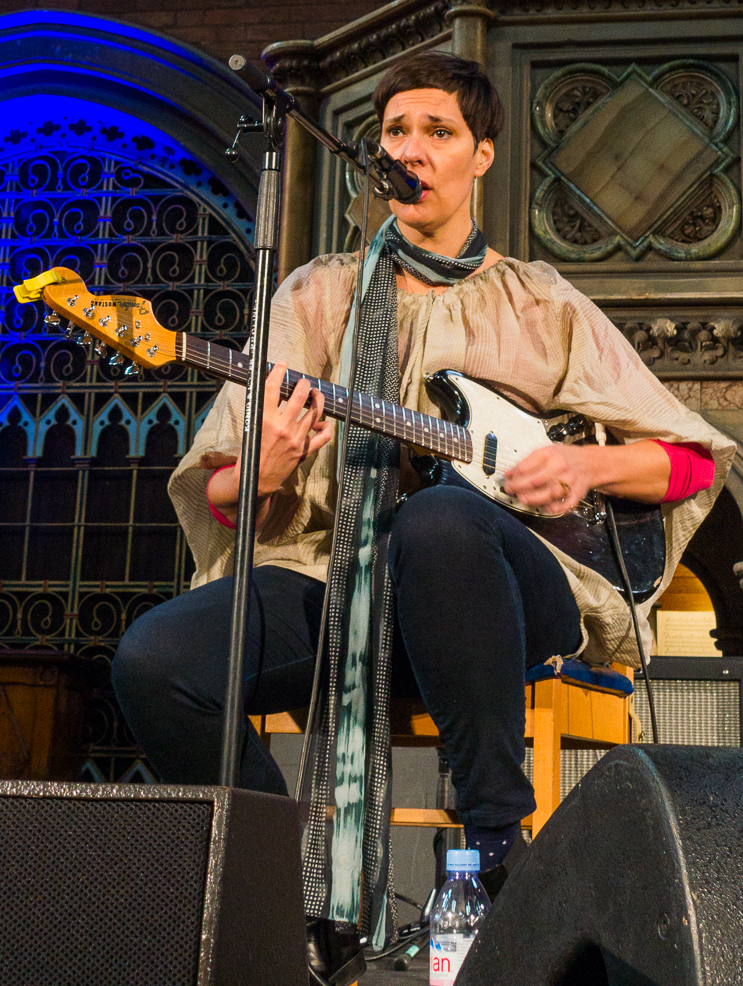
Sadier in 2015

In 1996, Sadier formed Monade with Pram's Rosie Cuckston. The group released the singles "The Sunrise Telling" and "Witch Hazel/Ode to a Keyring" in 1997. The band's debut album Socialisme ou Barbarie: The Bedroom Recordings was released on Duophonic Records in Europe and Drag City in the US in 2003. Their second album A Few Steps More was released on Too Pure in 2004. Monade's follow-up, Monstre Cosmic, was released in February 2008 on Duophonic. She retired the project in 2009 to perform new songs under her name, and released a solo album titled The Trip in September 2010; it was followed by Silencio in 2012 and Something Shines in 2014. Sadier released the album Find Me Finding You in 2017, credited to the Lætitia Sadier Source Ensemble.

=== Collaborations and other projects ===
Sadier has contributed vocals to various groups and projects, at times along with the late Stereolab member Mary Hansen. She and Hansen had contributed vocals to various recordings of The High Llamas and to the Tim Gane/Sean O'Hagan side project Turn On, and has contributed backing vocals to the track "Go Round" on The Hair and Skin Trading Company's 1993 album Over Valence. Sadier added French backing vocals on the 1994 song "To the End," from Blur's Parklife album. In 1995, she recorded the Serge Gainsbourg/Brigitte Bardot song "Bonnie and Clyde" with Luna. Throughout the years, Sadier has occasionally collaborated with German electronica group Mouse on Mars. In 1997, Sadier sang on "Schnick Schnack Meltmade" on Mouse on Mars' Autoditacker LP, and she and Mary Hansen contributed vocals to the Cache Cœur Naif EP. In turn, Mouse on Mars produced tracks on Stereolab's Dots and Loops LP.

In 2001, Sadier sang on "Sol y sombra" on Fugu's Fugu 1 LP on Minty Fresh Records. In 2002, Sadier sang the chorus on "New Wave" from Common's album Electric Circus. She sang lead vocals on "Haiku One" from Sigmatropic's 2004 album Sixteen Haiku & Other Stories which was an album based on the poetry of Greek poet Giorgos Seferis. In 2007, Sadier wrote songs with Mouse on Mars and toured with them in Italy. They have yet to record the songs for release. In 2009 the French label Deux Mille released an EP which features Sadier singing with Toulouse-based band Momotte.

Sadier wrote and sang the lyrics to the track "Quick Canal" by Atlas Sound on their album Logos (2009). She contributed vocals to "PartyIsntOver/Campfire/Bimmer" on the album Wolf (2013) by Tyler, the Creator, and "Summer Long" on the album Alexandre (2014) by Brazilian band Mombojó. She wrote the lyrics and was featured in "La Ballade" on the album Something About April II (2016) by Adrian Younge, and sang on the album I'm Willing (2016) by Marker Starling. In 2017, she appeared on the Deerhoof song "Come Down Here and Say That" from their album Mountain Moves. In 2019 she appeared on the Mercury Rev album Bobbie Gentry's The Delta Sweete Revisited where she sang lead vocals on the track Mornin' Glory.

In 2020, Sadier appeared as featured lead singer on two compositions by Chapman Stick virtuoso Michael Bernier, released on his third solo full-length release The Beach Album. Together with Jarvis Cocker she released in 2021 on the album Tip-Top Chansons d´Ennui a cover version of French classic Paroles, Paroles originally sung by Dalida and Alain Delon. In 2023, she released a full-length album collaboration with Mombojó, What Will You Grow Now?, issued under the band name Modern Cosmology.

In 2023, Sadier appeared as a guest vocalist on the Pearl & The Oysters single "Read the Room", featured on their album Coast 2 Coast released by Stones Throw Records.

On 13 November 2023, Sadier announced her fifth solo album, Rooting for Love, with a release date of 23 February 2024 by Drag City. On it she is joined by a vocal ensemble of men and women. The album's central theme, Sadler says, is "a call for Gnossis" which she describes as "an inquisitive outlook that will lend clue to the traumatised civilisations of earth." It follows a nature-based theme.

== Personal life ==
Born in Vincennes, Sadier spent part of her adolescence in Poughkeepsie as her father worked as an engineer for IBM. She and Tim Gane were a couple when they formed Stereolab in 1990 but ended the relationship in 2002. They have a son, born in 1998.

Sadier revealed in a 2024 interview with Jacobin that she had long COVID following her initial infection in March 2020.

== Discography ==
=== With Monade ===
- Socialisme ou Barbarie (The Bedroom Recordings) (Duophonic, 2003)
- A Few Steps More (Too Pure, 2005)
- Monstre Cosmic (Too Pure, 2008)

=== Solo albums ===
- The Trip (Drag City, 2010)
- Silencio (Drag City, 2012)
- Something Shines (Drag City, 2014)
- Find Me Finding You (Drag City, 2017) (as Laetitia Sadier Source Ensemble)
- Rooting for Love (Drag City, 2024)

=== Solo singles ===
- La Piscine – An Invitation by Lætitia Sadier to Keep On Swimming (12", Wool, 2011)
- Dry Fruit (cassette, Drag City, 2015)

=== With Modern Cosmology ===
- Summer Long EP (Elefant Records, 2017)
- What Will You Grow Now (Duophonic, 2023)
