= I Am a Wallet =

Studio album by McCarthy
- Released: November 1987
- Recorded: 1987, Scarf Studios, London
- Genre: Indie pop
- Length: 37:52
- Label: September Records, Cherry Red (2007), Optic Nerve Recordings (2015)
- Producer: Nigel Palmer, Trigger, McCarthy

McCarthy chronology
I Am a Wallet (1987)	The Enraged Will Inherit the Earth (1989)

Professional ratings
Review scores
Source	Rating
Allmusic	4/5 stars
New Musical Express	8/10
Underground	3/3 stars

I Am a Wallet is the debut studio album by English indie pop band McCarthy. It was first released in November 1987.

After recording three singles, "In Purgatory", "Red Sleeping Beauty" and "Frans Hals", I Am a Wallet demonstrates jangly guitar pop reminiscent of The Byrds. While this form of indie pop was widespread in '80s underground Britain, McCarthy brought left-wing politics to the genre. Religion is attacked in "God Made the Virus", while the return of Victorian values espoused by Margaret Thatcher is compared to medieval oppression in "In the Dark Times".

Johnny Dee of Underground magazine gave the album a 3/3 review, naming it as his favourite record of the year. I Am a Wallet has since been described by Nicky Wire as "the most perfect record, a Communist manifesto with tunes". On the album cover of the 2007 re-release he writes that McCarthy "are partly to blame for the realisation of the Manic Street Preachers". James Dean Bradfield rated I Am a Wallet as his top British album of all time.

The cover art features Georg Grosz's painting Widmung an Oskar Panizza (The Funeral).

== Track listing ==
1. "An MP Speaks" – 2:10
2. "Monetaries" – 1:57
3. "The International Narcotics Traffic" – 2:25
4. "The Way of the World" – 2:28
5. "Antinature" – 1:42
6. "Charles Windsor" – 1:38
7. "The Vision of Peregrine Worsthorne" – 2:50
8. "The Well of Loneliness" – 2:29
9. "The Wicked Palace Revolution" – 2:32
10. "God Made the Virus" – 1:40
11. "The Funeral" – 1:51
12. "A Child Soon in Chains" – 1:46
13. "In the Dark Times" – 1:44
14. "The Procession of Popular Capitalism" – 3:07

== Re-releases ==
In 1989, the album was re-released on CD with four bonus tracks from The Well of Loneliness EP. The track listing is:

1. "An MP Speaks"
2. "Monetaries"
3. "The International Narcotics Traffic"
4. "The Way of the World"
5. "Antinature"
6. "Charles Windsor"
7. "The Vision of Peregrine Worsthorne"
8. "Unfortunately"
9. "Bad Dreams"
10. "Someone Worse Off"
11. "Antiamericancretin"
12. "The Well of Loneliness"
13. "The Wicked Palace Revolution"
14. "God Made the Virus"
15. "The Funeral"
16. "A Child Soon in Chains"
17. "In the Dark Times"
18. "The Procession of Popular Capitalism"

In 1999, the album was re-released on CD with "Banking, Violence and the Inner Life Today". The track listing is:

1. "An MP Speaks" – 2:10
2. "Monetaries" – 1:57
3. "The International Narcotics Traffic" – 2:25
4. "The Way of the World" – 2:28
5. "Antinature" – 1:42
6. "Charles Windsor" – 1:38
7. "The Vision of Peregrine Worsthorne" – 2:50
8. "The Well of Loneliness" – 2:29
9. "The Wicked Palace Revolution" – 2:32
10. "God Made the Virus" – 1:40
11. "The Funeral" – 1:51
12. "A Child Soon in Chains" – 1:46
13. "In the Dark Times" – 1:44
14. "The Procession of Popular Capitalism" – 3:07
15. "I'm on the Side of Mankind as Much as the Next Man" – 4:19
16. "And Tomorrow the Stock Exchange Will Be the Human Race" – 5:33
17. "Now Is the Time for an Iron Hand" – 4:27
18. "The Drinking Song of the Merchant Bankers" – 5:55
19. "Write Your MP Today" – 3:53
20. "Use a Bank I'd Rather Die" – 4:27
21. "I Worked Myself Up from Nothing" – 3:40
22. "The Well-Fed Point of View" – 3:07
23. "Get a Knife Between Your Teeth" – 3:05
24. "Take the Shortest Way with the Men of Violence" – 4:39
25. "You'll Have to Put an End to Them" – 2:23

In 2007, the album was re-released on CD again (Cherry Red Records), only in European countries. Tracks 15–23 comprise the bonus tracks. Tracks 15–18 ("Unfortunately", "Bad Dreams", "Someone Worse Off", and "Antiamericancretin") are the added tracks on the 1989 re-release of the album; tracks 19–22 ("The Fall", "The Funeral", "The Enemy Is At Home (For the Fat Lady)", and "The Way of the World") are from the 1988 12" "This Nelson Rockefeller"; track 23 is from the compilation EP "A La Guillotine". The track listing this time around is:

1. "An MP Speaks"
2. "Monetaries"
3. "The International Narcotics Traffic"
4. "The Way of the World"
5. "Antinature"
6. "Charles Windsor"
7. "The Vision of Peregrine Worsthorne"
8. "The Well of Loneliness"
9. "The Wicked Palace Revolution"
10. "God Made the Virus"
11. "The Funeral"
12. "A Child Soon in Chains"
13. "In The Dark Times"
14. "The Procession of Popular Capitalism"
15. "Unfortunately"
16. "Bad Dreams"
17. "Someone Worse Off"
18. "Antiamericancretin"
19. "The Fall"
20. "The Funeral"
21. "The Enemy Is at Home (For the Fat Lady)"
22. "The Way of The World"
23. "In Purgatory"

In August 2015, the album was remastered and re-released with a bonus LP of tracks taken from the first four singles by Optic Nerve Recordings.

LP 1:

1. "An MP Speaks"
2. "Monetaries"
3. "The International Narcotics Traffic"
4. "The Way of the World"
5. "Antinature"
6. "Charles Windsor"
7. "The Vision of Peregrine Worsthorne"
8. "The Well of Loneliness"
9. "The Wicked Palace Revolution"
10. "God Made The Virus"
11. "The Funeral"
12. "A Child Soon in Chains"
13. "In The Dark Times"
14. "The Procession of Popular Capitalism"

LP 2:

1. "In Purgatory" (re-recorded version)
2. "Comrade Era" (re-recorded version)
3. "Something Wrong Somewhere" (original version)
4. "Red Sleeping Beauty"
5. "From The Damned"
6. "For The Fat Lady"
7. "Frans Hals"
8. "Kill Kill Kill Kill"
9. "You’re Alive"
10. "Bad Dreams"
11. "Someone Worse Off"
12. "Antiamericancretin"
13. "Unfortunately"

== Singles ==
"The Well of Loneliness"

== Personnel ==
McCarthy

- Malcolm Eden – voice, guitar
- Tim Gane – lead guitar
- John Williamson – bass guitar
- Gary Baker – drums

with:

- John Hymas – viola
- Andrew Golding – harpsichord

Technical

- Nigel Palmer – engineer, producer
- Andy Royston – sleeve design
