= The Enraged Will Inherit the Earth =

Studio album by McCarthy
- Released: March 1989
- Genre: Indie pop
- Length: 44:00
- Label: Midnight Music
- Producer: Ian Caple, McCarthy

McCarthy chronology
I Am a Wallet (1987)	The Enraged Will Inherit the Earth (1989)	Banking, Violence and the Inner Life Today (1990)

Professional ratings
Review scores
Source	Rating
AllMusic	4/5 stars

The Enraged Will Inherit the Earth was the second album by the band McCarthy. It was released in March 1989 by Midnight Music.

== Track listing ==
1. "Boy Meets Girl So What" - 6:13
2. "Governing Takes Brains" - 4:18
3. "An Address to the Better Off" - 4:34
4. "Hands Off or Die" - 2:01
5. "What Our Boys Are Fighting For" - 5:05
6. "Keep an Open Mind or Else" - 3:42
7. "We Are All Born Creeps" - 4:52
8. "I'm Not a Patriot But" - 3:39
9. "The Home Secretary Briefs the Forces of Law and Order" - 4:20
10. "Throw Him Out He's Breaking My Heart" - 5:16

== Singles ==
"Keep an Open Mind or Else"

== Reissue ==
The album was reissued in 1998 by Cherry Red Records with the additional tracks "Boy Meets Girl So What" (version), "All Your Questions Answered", "New Left Review #2" and "The Lion Will Lie Down with the Lamb" (from the At War EP), "Nobody Could Care Less About Your Private Lives", "With One Eye on Getting Their Pay", and "Can the Haves Use Their Brains" (from the Get the Knife Between Your Teeth EP) and "St. Francis Amongst the Mortals" from the Should The Bible Be Banned single.

== Personnel ==
McCarthy

- Malcolm Eden – voice, guitar
- Tim Gane – lead guitar
- John Williamson – bass guitar
- Gary Baker – drums

Additional musicians

- Vicky Richardson – violin
- Lætitia Sadier – vocals
