= Barking Abbey School =

State secondary school in London, England

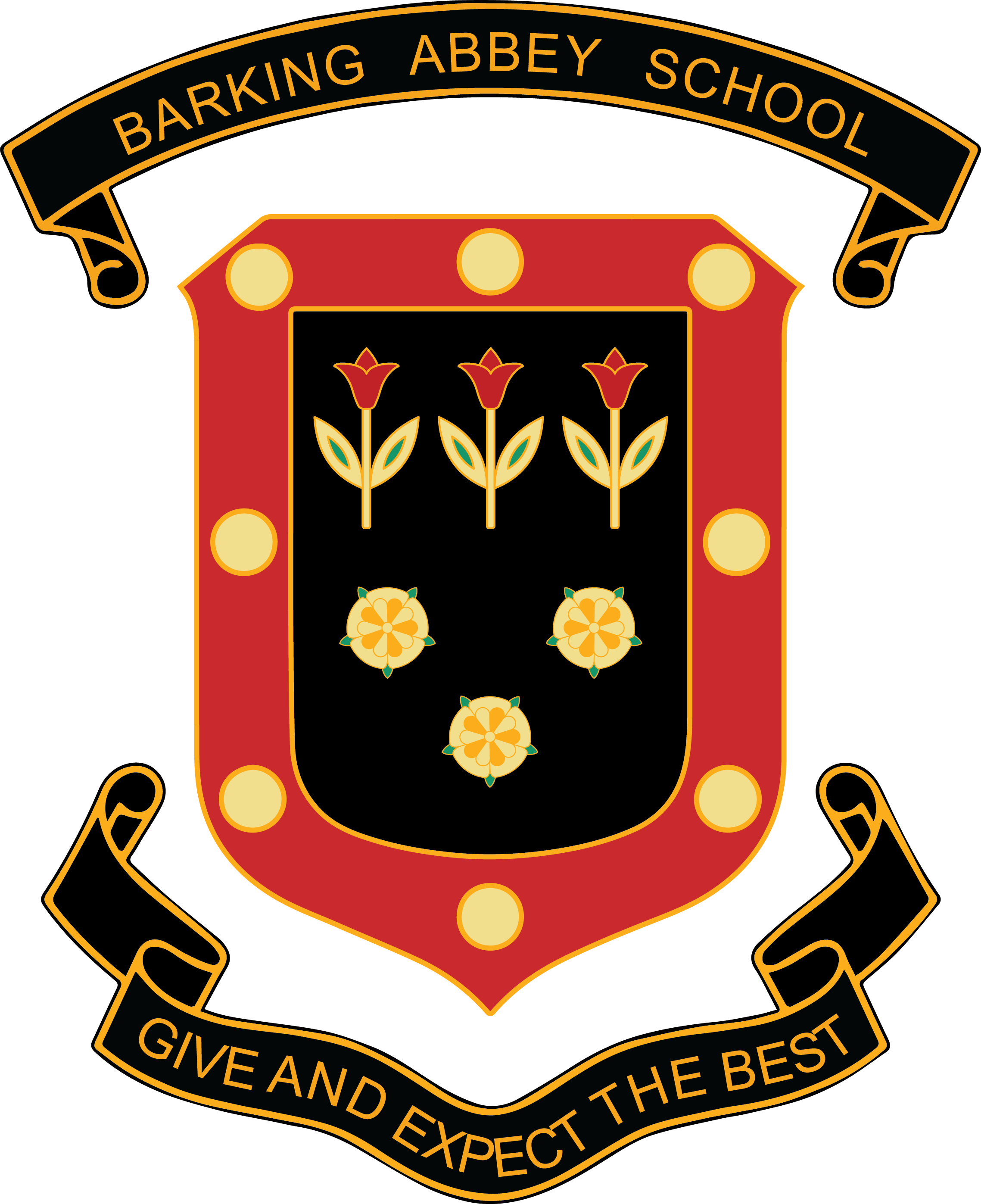

Location
- Sandringham Road; Barking, IG11 9AG; England; 51°32′33″N 0°06′05″E

Information
- Type: Community school
- Motto: Give and Expect the Best
- Established: 1922; 104 years ago
- Local authority: Barking and Dagenham
- Specialists: Sports and humanities
- Department for Education URN: 101241 Tables
- Ofsted: Reports
- Headteacher: Tony Roe
- Gender: Coeducational
- Age: 11 to 18
- Enrolment: 1972
- Former name: Barking Abbey Grammar School
- Website: http://www.barkingabbeyschool.co.uk

Barking Abbey School is a secondary school and specialist sports and humanities college located in the London Borough of Barking and Dagenham. It serves students from the London Boroughs of Barking and Dagenham, Redbridge, and Newham. Years 7 to 11 (ages 11 – 16) are at the Longbridge Road site and years 7 to 13 (ages 11 – 18) at the Sandringham Road site. Barking Abbey also has a Sixth Form of over 400 students which is at the Sandringham Road site. A Level and BTEC courses are available to 16 - 18 year-olds in the Sixth Form. Both sites are situated to the west of Mayesbrook Park and to the north of Upney Underground station.

== History ==
Barking Abbey School was founded in 1922, the first co-educational grammar school in England. The first headmaster was Colonel Ernest Loftus, who stayed for 27 years, being replaced by Mr Frank Young DFC in 1949.

In 2005, Barking Abbey started the Barking Abbey Basketball Academy. This enabled younger players from around London, Essex, and Hertfordshire to experience the life of being in a basketball academy, preparing some of them to move abroad on scholarships to various countries around the world. It has been announced that Barking Abbey will become the first pilot Regional Institute of Basketball within Great Britain.

In 2007, Barking Abbey's Dance Department opened its Dance Academy as a "centre of excellence".

Historic records of Barking Abbey School for 1922-1977 are held at Barking and Dagenham Archive Service, Valence House Museum. This collections includes early pupil records, staff records, sports, photographs, and house record books.

== Academic performance ==
In 2019, the school's Progress 8 benchmark at GCSE was above average. 49% of children at the school achieved Grade 5 or above in both English and maths GCSEs, compared to the Barking and Dagenham average of 43% and the national average, also 43%. The school's Attainment 8 score at GCSE was 49, compared to the Barking and Dagenham average of 47 and the national average, also 47.

At A-Level in 2019, the school's Progress score was below average. The average result was C−, compared to the Barking and Dagenham average of C and the national average of C+. The percentage of students completing their A level courses was 97%, compared to the Barking and Dagenham average of 91% and the national average of 91%.

== Notable former pupils ==
- Graham Allen, writer and academic
- Ravi Bopara, Essex and England cricketer
- Billy Bragg, musician (spent a year at Park Modern Secondary School)
- Wayne Brown, footballer
- Malcolm Eden, member of indie pop band McCarthy
- Tim Gane, member of McCarthy and Stereolab
- Robert Gilchrist, professional basketball player
- Michael Hector, footballer
- JJ Jegede, British long jumper
- Joss Labadie, footballer
- Danis Salman, footballer
- Akwasi Yeboah, basketball player
- Bobby Zamora, footballer
- Joe Ikhinmwin, former professional basketball player and media personality

=== Barking Abbey Grammar School ===
- Carole Ann Ford, actor, played Susan Foreman from 1963-64 in Doctor Who
- C. J. Freezer, model railway enthusiast
- Sir Brian Jarman OBE, physician and academic
- Royston Lambert, progressive headteacher and author
- Steve Mogford, Chief executive since 2011 of United Utilities Group plc
- Brian Poole, lead singer of The Tremeloes
- Prof Alan Smithers, (attended 1949–56), author, broadcaster and educationist

== Arms ==
Coat of arms of Barking Abbey School

Notes
Granted 10 June 1955
Crest
On a wreath Or and azure in front of a representation of Barking Abbey Curfew Tower an open book Proper edged Or and bound Gules.
Escutcheon
Azure in chief three lilies in fesse Argent stalked leaved and slipped Vert and in base·as many roses Or barbed and seeded Proper on a bordure Gules eight plates.

== See also ==
- List of schools in the United Kingdom
- Education in England
