= Banking, Violence and the Inner Life Today =

Studio album by McCarthy
- Released: August 1990
- Genre: Indie pop
- Length: 45:19
- Label: Midnight Music

McCarthy chronology
The Enraged Will Inherit the Earth (1989)	Banking, Violence and the Inner Life Today (1990)

Banking, Violence and the Inner Life Today was the third and final album by the band McCarthy. It was released in August 1990.

== Track listing ==
1. "I'm on the Side of Mankind as Much as the Next Man" – 4:19
2. "And Tomorrow the Stock Exchange Will Be the Human Race" – 5:33
3. "Now Is the Time for an Iron Hand" – 4:27
4. "The Drinking Song of the Merchant Bankers" – 5:55
5. "Write to Your MP Today" – 3:53
6. "Use a Bank I'd Rather Die" – 4:27
7. "I Worked Myself Up from Nothing" – 3:40
8. "The Well-Fed Point of View" – 3:07
9. "Get a Knife Between Your Teeth" – 3:05
10. "Take the Shortest Way with the Men of Violence" – 4:39
11. "You'll Have to Put an End to Them" – 2:23

== Re-releases ==
In 1999, the album was re-released on CD with I Am a Wallet. The track listing is:

1. "An MP Speaks" – 2:10
2. "Monetaries" – 1:57
3. "The International Narcotics Traffic" – 2:25
4. "The Way of the World" – 2:28
5. "Antinature" – 1:42
6. "Charles Windsor" – 1:38
7. "The Vision of Peregrine Worsthorne" – 2:50
8. "The Well of Loneliness" – 2:29
9. "The Wicked Palace Revolution" – 2:32
10. "God Made The Virus" – 1:40
11. "The Funeral" – 1:51
12. "A Child Soon in Chains" – 1:46
13. "In The Dark Times" – 1:44
14. "The Procession of Popular Capitalism" – 3:07
15. "I'm on the Side of Mankind as Much as the Next Man" – 4:19
16. "And Tomorrow the Stock Exchange Will Be the Human Race" – 5:33
17. "Now Is the Time for an Iron Hand" – 4:27
18. "The Drinking Song of the Merchant Bankers" – 5:55
19. "Write to Your MP Today" – 3:53
20. "Use a Bank I'd Rather Die" – 4:27
21. "I Worked Myself Up from Nothing" – 3:40
22. "The Well-Fed Point of View" – 3:07
23. "Get a Knife Between Your Teeth" – 3:05
24. "Take the Shortest Way with the Men of Violence" – 4:39
25. "You'll Have to Put an End to Them" – 2:23

== Singles ==
"Get a Knife Between Your Teeth"

== Personnel ==
McCarthy

- Malcolm Eden – voice, guitar
- Tim Gane – lead guitar
- John Williamson – bass guitar
- Gary Baker – drums
- Lætitia Sadier – vocals
