= That's All Very Well But... =

Compilation album by McCarthy
- Released: 1996
- Recorded: 1986–1988
- Genre: Indie pop
- Length: 58:48
- Label: Cherry Red

McCarthy chronology
A La Guillotine! (1988)	That's All Very Well But... (1996)

Professional ratings
Review scores
Source	Rating
Allmusic	4/5 stars

That's All Very Well But... is a best-of compilation of the band McCarthy.

Initially planned for release in 1991 but shelved after the Midnight Music label went bankrupt, it finally surfaced in 1996 on Cherry Red, which took over the rights to a number of artists from the defunct Midnight Music (among them The Wolfhounds, The Snake Corps, The Essence and Sad Lovers & Giants).

That's All Very Well But... is a collection of McCarthy singles, rarities and Peel Sessions. The release presents many of the band's best moments combining political passion with sparkling indie pop music.

The Peel Session tracks, taken from three different appearances, generally come across in a slightly crisper fashion than the other studio cuts. It includes an alternate version of "Should The Bible Be Banned", which is a touch quieter with more prominent acoustic guitar.

== Track listing ==
1. "Red Sleeping Beauty" – 3:43
2. "Should the Bible Be Banned" – 3:08
3. "An MP Speaks" – 2:02
4. "The Fall" – 1:48
5. "The Funeral" – 2:15
6. "We Are All Bourgeois Now" – 4:46
7. "Antinature" – 1:46
8. "Kill Kill Kill Kill" – 1:31
9. "Frans Hals" – 3:15
10. "The Myth of the North – South Divide" – 3:00
11. "Something Wrong Somewhere" – 2:00
12. "This Nelson Rockefeller" – 4:01
13. "Charles Windsor" – 2:02
14. "From The Damned" – 3:26
15. "A Child Soon in Chains" – 1:47
16. "The Enemy Is at Home (For the Fat Lady)" – 2:09
17. "The Well of Loneliness" – 2:33
18. "You're Alive" – 2:13
19. "Keep an Open Mind or Else" – 3:11
20. "I'm Not a Patriot But" – 3:17
21. "The Comrade Era" – 1:22
22. "Should the Bible Be Banned (alternate version)" – 3:22
- Peel Session No. 1 (recorded 7 October 1986, transmitted 12 November 1986) tracks 3, 7, 9, 15
- Peel Session No. 2 (recorded 20 October 1987, transmitted 28 October 1987) tracks 5, 13
- Peel Session No. 3 (recorded 23 October 1988, transmitted 1 November 1988) tracks 10, 19, 20

== Planned track listing CD/cassette ==
1. "Red Sleeping Beauty"
2. "Should The Bible Be Banned ('7-inch' Version)"
3. "The Myth of the North/South Divide"
4. "The Enemy Is at Home"
5. "The Funeral" *
6. "This Nelson Rockefelle]"
7. "The Vision of Peregrine Worsthorne"*
8. "The Fall"
9. "An MP Speaks" *
10. "Kill Kill Kill Kill"
11. "We Are All Bourgeois Now"
12. "From The Damned"
13. "You're Alive"
14. "Antinature" *
15. "Frans Hals" *
16. "Charles Windsor" *
17. "For The Fat Lady"
18. "Keep An Open Mind Or Else (Acoustic Guitar Mix)"
19. "A Child Soon in Chains" *
20. "Should The Bible Be Banned"

* John Peel/Janice Long BBC session recordings

== Planned track listing LP ==
Side A:

1. "Red Sleeping Beauty"
2. "The Myth of the North/South Divide"
3. "The Funeral" *
4. "This Nelson Rockefeller"
5. "The Vision of Peregrine Worsthorne" *
6. "The Fall"
7. "Should The Bible Be Banned ('7-inch' Version)"

Side B:

1. "We Are All Bourgeois Now"
2. "From The Damned"
3. "You're Alive"
4. "Keep An Open Mind Or Else (Acoustic Guitar Mix)"
5. "The Enemy Is at Home"
6. "Frans Hals" *
7. "Charles Windsor" *

* John Peel/Janice Long BBC session recordings

The test pressing has the tracks "Frans Hals" and "Charles Windsor" the other way around.

== Planned track listing mini-LP We'll Get You You Creeps ==
Side A:

1. "Frans Hals (7-inch Version?)"
2. "Something Wrong"
3. "In Purgatory"
4. "An MP Speaks" *
5. "The Comrade Era" *

Side B:

1. "Kill Kill Kill Kill"
2. "A Child Soon in Chains" *
3. "God The Father"
4. "Antinature" *
5. "For The Fat Lady"

* John Peel/Janice Long BBC session recordings

The BBC Session for "The Vision of Peregrine Worsthorne" remains unreleased. The studio version for "The Myth of the North/South Divide" comes from the Lie To Me compilation album. Several other tracks also have their origin from elusive releases and are not on the final release.
