= The Funeral (Grosz) =

Painting by George Grosz

The Funeral (Dedicated to Oskar Panizza)
- Widmung an Oskar Panizza (German)
- Artist: George Grosz
- Year: 1917–18
- Medium: Oil on canvas
- Dimensions: 140 cm × 110 cm (55 in × 43 in)
- Location: Staatsgalerie Stuttgart; Stuttgart

The Funeral (often The Funeral (Dedicated to Oskar Panizza)) is a painting by the German Expressionist artist George Grosz, completed between 1917 and 1918. The work combines elements of Futurism and Cubism to show a funeral procession in a modern urban city, as an infernal abyss populated by twisted and grotesque attendants. The painting is dedicated to the German psychiatrist and avant-garde writer Oskar Panizza (1853–1921), noted for his play Liebeskonzil which draws on the first historically documented outbreak of syphilis and depicts God the Father as a senile old man. Panizza's works, in which he rejected militarism and religious authority were deemed blasphemous by the Church and the government of Emperor Wilhelm II. They were later admired by Grosz and other idealists of the dada generation.

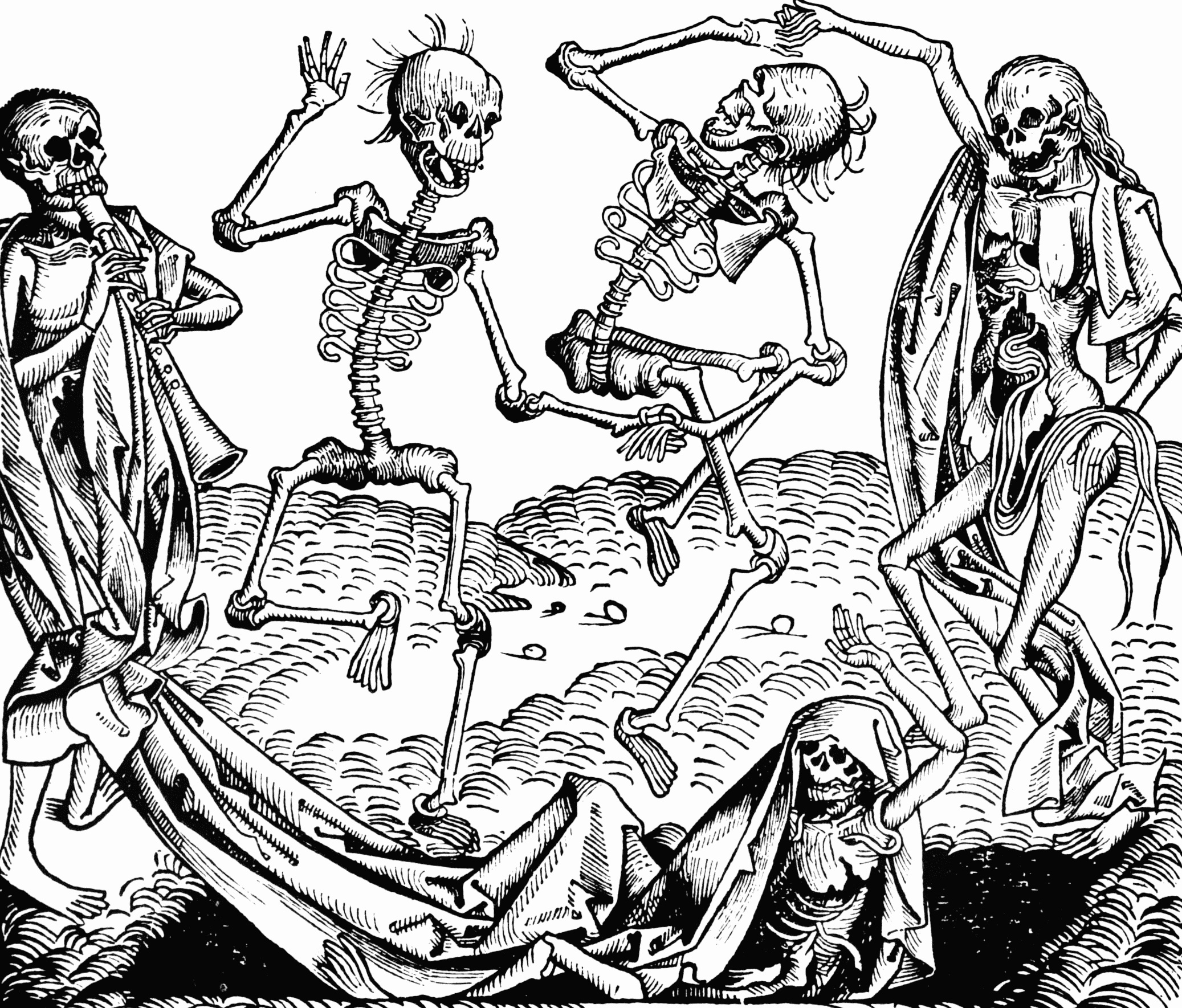
Danse Macabre ("The Dance of Death"), Michael Wolgemut 1493, from the Liber chronicarum by Hartmann Schedel

The painting seeks to emulate medieval depictions of hellscapes, mainly through dramatic colourisation—in particular through its use of red light—as well as through the depiction of multitudes of layered distorted bodies and limbs, echoing the work of Bruegel in the 16th century. A skeleton representing the Grim Reaper sits on the coffin, drinking from a bottle. A mob of mourners gathered around him are presented as ugly, frenzied and as if ridden with alcoholism and late-stage syphilis.

Tall claustrophobic buildings are lined above the procession. They seem to heave and bend backwards and forwards, as if about to topple over and collapse onto those cluddered below. Among these buildings is a lone small church, surrounded by bars, nightclubs and offices. Giving a literal voice to the "Dance of Death" depicted by the artist, a sign over one club reads "DANCE TONIGHT".

Explaining his intention when creating the work, Grosz said,

"In a strange street by night, a hellish procession of dehumanized figures mills, their faces reflecting alcohol, syphilis, plague ... I painted this protest against a humanity that had gone insane."

The painting served as the cover artwork for the 1987 album I Am a Wallet by the British rock band McCarthy.

== Sources ==
- Wolf, Norbert; Grosenick, Uta. Expressionism. Taschen, 2004. ISBN 3-8228-2126-8
