= Red Sleeping Beauty =

Single by McCarthy
- B-side: "From the Damned"; "God the Father" (12" only); "For the Fat Lady" (12" only)
- Released: October 1986
- Genre: Indie pop
- Label: Pink
- Songwriter(s): Malcolm Eden, Tim Gane

McCarthy singles chronology
"In Purgatory" (1986)	"Red Sleeping Beauty" (1986)	"Frans Hals" (1987)

"Red Sleeping Beauty" was the second single by McCarthy released in October 1986.

The B-sides were "From the Damned", "God the Father" and "For the Fat Lady". The latter two were only available on the 12" vinyl release.

The single is not on any of the band's three studio albums. It can be found on the releases A La Guillotine and That's All Very Well But.... The song is believed to have been written as a protest to the Margaret Thatcher government.

The song has been covered by Manic Street Preachers frontman James Dean Bradfield and features as a B-side to the Manics single "Autumnsong" released on 16 July 2007.

A Swedish indie pop band was named after the song title.
