= NORWEB =

UK regional electricity supplier (1948–1995)

Norweb
- Formerly: North Western Electricity Board
- Industry: Electric utility
- Founded: 1948
- Defunct: 1995 (merged); 2001 (branding retired)
- Fate: Merged with North West Water to form United Utilities, retail stores acquired by and merged into Comet
- Area served: North West England

Norweb, originally the North Western Electricity Board, was a British electricity supply and distribution company. It supplied electricity to about 4.7 million industrial, commercial and domestic customers in the North West of England, although Merseyside and parts of Cheshire were instead covered by Manweb.

== History ==
=== Nationalised industry ===
The board was originally formed in 1948, as part of the nationalisation of the electricity industry by the Electricity Act 1947. The board was responsible for the purchase of electricity from the electricity generator (the Central Electricity Generating Board from 1958) and its distribution and sale to customers. The key people on the board were: Chairman R. F. Richardson (1964, 1967), Deputy Chairman F. Linley (1964, 1967), full-time member J. W. K. Evans (1967).

The total number of customers supplied by the board was as follows:

Norweb Customers, 1949–89
Year	1948/9	1960/1	1965/6	1970/1	1975/6	1978/9	1980/1	1985/6	1987/8	1988/9
No. of Customers, ('000s)	1,259	1,671	1,793	1,850	1,914	1,960	1,979	2,037	2,065	2,080

Electricity, in GWh, sold by Norweb

=== Existing electricity suppliers taken over at nationalisation ===
The Electricity (Allocation of Undertakings to Area Boards) Order 1948 (SI 1948/484) transferred the electricity business of the following local authorities and private companies to the new board effective 31 March 1948.

==== Local authorities ====
- Accrington Corporation
- Alderley Edge and Wilmslow Electricity Board
- Ashton-in-Makerfield Urban District Council
- Ashton-under-Lyne Corporation
- Atherton Urban District Council
- Bacup Corporation
- Barrow-in-Furness Corporation
- Blackburn Corporation
- Blackpool Corporation
- Bolton Corporation
- Bredbury and Romiley Urban District Council
- Brierfield Urban District Council
- Burnley Corporation
- Bury Corporation
- Buxton Corporation
- Carlisle Corporation
- Cheadle and Gatley Urban District Council
- Clitheroe Corporation
- Colne Corporation
- Darwen Corporation
- Eccles Corporation
- Farnworth Corporation
- Fleetwood Corporation
- Grange Urban District Council
- Haslingden Corporation
- Hazel Grove Bramhall Urban District Council
- Heywood Corporation
- Hindley Urban District Council
- Horwich Urban District Council
- Kendal Corporation
- Lancaster Corporation
- Leigh Corporation
- Littleborough Urban District Council
- Lytham St. Anne's Corporation
- Macclesfield Corporation
- Manchester Corporation
- Marple Urban District Council
- Middleton Corporation
- Millon Rural District Council
- Milnrow Urban District Council
- Morecambe and Heysham Corporation
- Nelson Corporation
- New Mills Urban District Council
- Newton-le-Willows Urban District Council
- Oldham Corporation
- Padiham Urban District Council
- Preston Corporation
- Radcliffe Corporation
- Rawtenstall Corporation
- Rochdale Corporation
- Sale Corporation
- Salford Corporation
- Stalybridge, Hyde, Mossley and Dukinfield Transport and Electricity Board
- Stockport Corporation
- Stretford and District Electricity Board
- Swinton and Pendlebury Corporation
- Thornton Cleveleys Urban District Council
- Turton Urban District Council
- Ulverston Urban District Council
- Whitehaven Corporation
- Whitworth Urban District Council
- Wigan Corporation
- Workington Corporation

==== Private companies ====
- Altrincham Electric Supply
- Cark and District Electricity Company
- Keswick Electric Light Company
- Lancashire Electric Power Company
- Mid-Cumberland Electricity Company
- Ormskirk Electric Supply Company
- Penrith Electric Supply Company
- Sedbergh Electricity Supply Company
- Settle and District Electricity Company
- South Cumberland Electricity Supply Company
- Trent Valley and High Peak Electricity Company
- Westmorland and District Electricity Supply Company
- Windermere and District Electricity Supply Company

=== Post privatisation ===
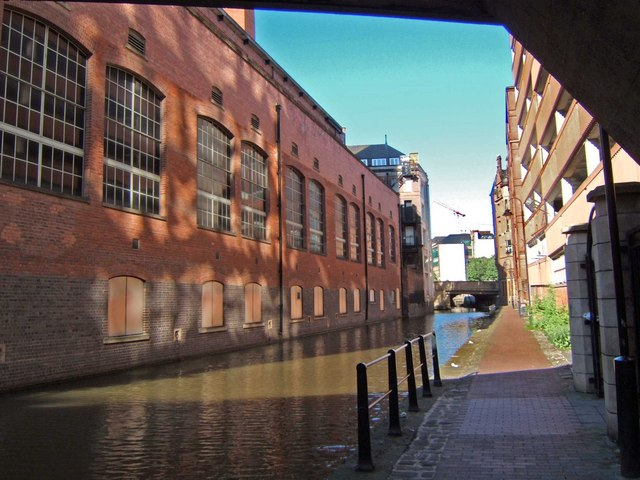
Bloom Street Power Station, Manchester

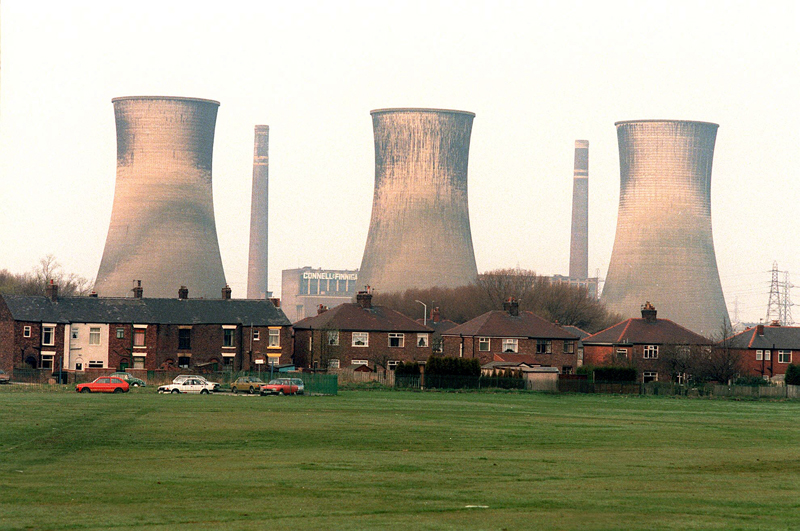
Chadderton Power Station

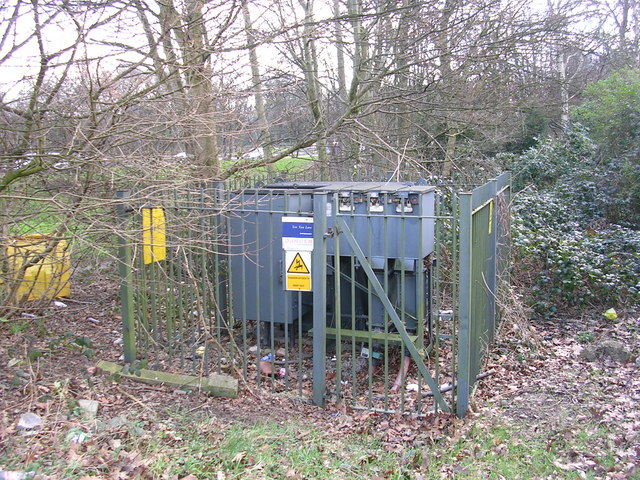
The electrical substation, Yewtree Lane, Northenden

The assets of the board passed to Norweb plc in July 1990, which was privatised in a stock market flotation later in the same year.

Norweb was acquired by North West Water in October 1995 for £1.83 billion. The combined water and electricity companies became United Utilities (UU). The customer base for the electricity supply arm was subsequently sold off in March 2000 to TXU Corporation, as Norweb Energi. TXU was itself acquired by Powergen in October 2002. Powergen was a subsidiary of E.ON at this point (having been acquired earlier in 2002), and was subsequently rebranded to E.ON UK in 2007.

The value electrical retailing arm Norweb Retail was sold to the Kingfisher Group in November 1996 for £51 million; seeing the closure of the Bolton head office, the CAS distribution centre in Worsley, the flagship Coventry 285, 57 high street stores and half of its out of town superstores. Remaining stores were rebranded under the name Comet.

UU retained the remainder of the company, including the distribution network in the northwest of England, as Norweb Distribution. In November 2001, Norweb was renamed United Utilities Electricity.

The company was the licensed distribution network operator for the North West England, until its sale in December 2007 to North West Electricity Networks, a joint venture between Colonial First State and JPMorgan Chase. Electricity North West became the licensed distribution network operator for the North West of England, as a consequence of the sale.

== Headquarters ==
A new headquarters building for the board was built in 1963 on the site of the Dickinson Street power station in Manchester. The architects of this steel-framed building were Harry S. Fairhurst & Son. The project required the draining and infilling of an arm of the Rochdale Canal. The staircases, lifts and cloakrooms are in the eastern wing, separate from the offices.

== Cultural references ==
English Rugby league team Wigan Warriors had Norweb as their primary shirt sponsor between 1988 and 1999 (as TXU Energi between 1998 and 1999). This period saw Wigan win many trophies: two Charity Shields in 1991 and 1995, seven of their eight record consecutive Challenge Cup Final wins 1989 to 1995, two World Club Challenge wins in 1991 and 1994, five Premiership Final wins between 1992 and 1997 in six consecutive appearances, two Lancashire Cup wins in 1988 and 1992, five John Player Special and Regal Trophy wins between 1989 and 1996 in six final appearances, seven successive league titles between 1990 and 1996 and a Super League title in 1998. Wigan's most successful season of that period was in 1994-95 when Wigan won the Grand Slam of all four trophies/cups. Norweb also sponsored a tram named "The Power" on the Manchester Metrolink network. Norweb's "The Power" advertising hoardings also featured prominently inside Manchester United's Old Trafford ground in the early 1990s.

Norweb was also referenced in Red Dwarf, which was originally produced in Manchester. Holly, the on board computer of the mining ship Red Dwarf, played a practical joke on Dave Lister. According to Holly, the Norweb Federation were looking for Lister for his crimes against humanity; leaving two half eaten sausages on his table before leaving, which over three million years had gone mouldy and now covered seven-eighths of the Earth's surface. Lister also owns 98% of all the planet Earth’s wealth due to £17.50 left in his bank account that was subject to compound interest and hoarded so nobody else had any money except Norweb, as Lister had left a light on in the bathroom. This all results in a final £180 billion demand from Lister before Holly reveals his gag.

Norweb is referenced in the Frank Sidebottom (aka Chris Sievey) song "Electricity" which is on his LP "5:9:88". In the song Frank (supposedly) loses his electricity bill down a drain and he sings "I remember thinking I should inform Norweb now..." He heads off the Norweb office to address the matter but window shops and arrives too late. When Frank returns home his electricity is cut off and his mum sends him to his room. The song is rather detailed and specifically mentions the location of a Norweb office in George Street, Altrincham in the Borough of Trafford. Apparently Sievey had experience with his electricity being cut off and this song, perhaps, conveys a real life situation.

== See also ==
- Companies merged into North Western Electricity Board
