= Electricity North West =

British electricity distribution network operator

Electricity North West Limited
- Formerly: Norweb plc (1989–2001); United Utilities Electricity plc (2001–2007); United Utilities Electricity Ltd (2007–2007)
- Company type: Subsidiary
- Industry: Energy
- Founded: April 1, 1989; 37 years ago
- Headquarters: Warrington, England, United Kingdom
- Key people: Stephanie Trubshaw (COO)
- Products: Electricity
- Parent: Iberdrola
- Website: enwl.co.uk

Electricity North West Limited trading as SP Electricity North West is a British electricity distribution network operator, responsible for the administration and maintenance of the network, that distributes electricity to much of North West England.

In 2023 it began a £2 billion five-year investment in the region's network as part of a five-year business plan. The plan was approved by the energy regulator, Ofgem.

== Operations ==
As the distribution network operator for much of North West England, SP Electricity North West owns and is responsible for the construction and maintenance of the network that distributes electricity in the region. This includes the inspection and maintenance of assets which include 8000 miles (13,000 km) of overhead lines, 27,000 miles (43,000 km) of underground cables, and 38,000 transformers. Its area of operation excludes Merseyside and parts of Cheshire which are the domain of another Iberdrola company, SP Energy Networks.

== Innovation ==
SP Electricity North West's technology known as CLASS (Customer Load Active System Services) reduces demand for electricity on local distribution networks, helping manage spikes in demand nationally. In 2022 an Ofgem panel agreed that the technology had met an exceptional threshold and stated that the technology could save customers across Great Britain more than £1bn.

== Background and history ==
The principal activity of the group is the distribution of electricity in North West England on behalf of the electricity supply companies. Customers receive their electricity bill from their suppliers who pay for use of the electricity network. SP Electricity North West delivers electricity to five million people, in 2.4 million properties in the North West.

The distribution network had originated as NORWEB, the state-owned North West Electricity Board from 1948 to 1990. On 19 December 2007, United Utilities Group plc sold United Utilities Electricity Limited to North West Electricity Networks (Jersey) Limited, a company advised by Colonial First State Global Asset Management and the Infrastructure Investment Group, advised by JP Morgan Asset Management.

United Utilities operated and maintained North West England's electricity network on behalf of Electricity North West Limited, until June 2010. On 30 June 2010, the company completed the purchase of United Utilities Electricity Services Limited (‘UUES’) from United Utilities Group PLC (‘UU’).

The purchase of UUES, which had previously been contracted to operate and maintain the network, established one group which owns, operates, manages and maintains its network. UUES was subsequently renamed Electricity North West Services Limited (‘ENWSL’). In November 2019, Equitix and power firm from Japan, Kansai Electric Power, acquired a 50% stake in ENW.

In August 2024, Spanish utility company Iberdrola agreed to acquire a majority stake of 88% in ENWL for €2.5 billion, valuing the company at €5bn including debt. The company was rebranded on 4 August 2025. Although the company has the same branding as Iberdrola's other British distribution network operator, SP Energy Networks, the businesses have yet to be formally merged.
