= Steve Mogford =

British businessman (born 1956)

- Born: 27 June 1956 (age 69)
- Education: Barking Abbey Grammar School, Essex
- Alma mater: Queen Elizabeth College, London
- Occupation: Businessman
- Title: former CEO, United Utilities
- Term: 2011-2023
- Predecessor: Philip Nevill Green
- Successor: Louise Beardmore

Steven Lewis Mogford (born 27 June 1956) is a British businessman. From 2011 to 2023, he was the chief executive (CEO) of United Utilities, the UK's largest listed water company.

== Early life ==
Mogford was educated at Barking Abbey Grammar School, Essex and Queen Elizabeth College, London, where he obtained a First Class degree in astrophysics, Maths and Physics.

== Career ==
Mogford began his career in 1977 as a supply engineer with British Aerospace Military Aircraft. He remained with British Aerospace until 2007 when he was Chief Operating Officer for Programmes at BAE Systems plc.

In May 2007 he joined Finmeccanica's SELEX Galileo as Chief Executive.

Mogford was the chief executive of United Utilities Group plc since March 2011, replacing Philip Nevill Green. He was a non-executive director with Carillion until September 2015.

== Personal life ==
Steve Mogford lives in Chorley in Lancashire.
