= Should the Bible Be Banned =

"Should The Bible Be Banned"

Single by McCarthy
- B-side: St. Francis Amongst The Mortals; We Are All Bourgeois Now
- Released: April 1988
- Genre: Indie pop
- Label: September Records
- Songwriters: Malcolm Eden, Tim Gane

McCarthy singles chronology
"This Nelson Rockefeller" (1988)	"Should The Bible Be Banned" (1988)	"Keep An Open Mind Or Else" (1989)

"Should The Bible Be Banned" was the sixth single by McCarthy. Like many of the band's singles it did not appear on any of the band's studio albums.

The b-sides were "St. Francis Amongst The Mortals" and "We Are All Bourgeois Now". The latter was covered by Manic Street Preachers on their album Know Your Enemy.

The title track recounts how someone is inspired to kill his brother by reading the story of Cain and Abel in the Bible. The song's aim is to reduce to absurdity calls to ban books and films following well-publicised acts of violence.
