= Philip Nevill Green =

British businessman

Philip Nevill Green CBE (born 12 May 1953) is a British business executive. He was chairman of Carillion from May 2014 until Carillion entered compulsory liquidation in January 2018. Green was chairman of BakerCorp from June 2011 until December 2017.

== Early life ==
Philip Green was born on 12 May 1953 in Walsall, Staffordshire. He graduated from University College of Swansea and completed an MBA at London Business School.

== Career ==
From 1977 to 1980, Green was vice-president, marketing of Crayonne (USA). From 1980 to 1985, he was managing director of the home furnishing division of the Coloroll group, becoming group development director in 1985, and then managing director from 1989 to 1990. In 1994, as a trustee of the Coloroll group's pension fund, he was found guilty of a breach of trust and of maladministration of the scheme by the Pensions Ombudsman. By this time, he was working for DHL, firstly as regional director for Northern Europe (1990–1994), and then as chief operating officer for Europe and Africa (1994–1999). He then spent four years with Thomson Reuters before being appointed as CEO of Royal P&O Nedlloyd from 2003 to 2006.

From 2006 to 2011 he was chief executive of United Utilities (succeeded by Steve Mogford), and was the chairman of the shipbroker, Clarkson. He advised the British prime minister David Cameron on issues such as corporate responsibility. In addition, he has supported several charity projects including Sentebale and Hope Through Action.

=== Carillion ===
On 3 January 2018 Carillion, a company chaired by Green, announced that the Financial Conduct Authority was investigating the timeliness and content of the company's announcements from December 2016 regarding its financial situation.

On 15 January 2018 Carillion was put into compulsory liquidation amidst widespread condemnation of its debt position and approach to risk in large contracts. Green said his responsibility was "full and complete, total – no question in my mind about that. Not necessarily culpability but full responsibility". Green was one of a number of former Carillion Directors described as "delusional characters" by House of Commons Select Committee Chairs Frank Field (Work and Pensions) and Rachel Reeves (Business, Energy and Industrial Strategy).

After further documentation and correspondence was published by the select committees, Carillion directors bosses were described by MPs as "fantasists" chasing "a pot of gold", with chairman Philip Green described by Rachel Reeves as having "either a woeful lack of leadership or no grip on reality", having advocated an "upbeat" messaging strategy five days before a profits warning.

In the final report of the Parliamentary inquiry into the collapse of Carillion, published on 16 May 2018, Green was described as "delusional". The report concluded:

He interpreted his role as to be an unquestioning optimist, an outlook he maintained in a delusional, upbeat assessment of the company’s prospects only days before it began its public decline. While the company’s senior executives were fired, Mr Green continued to insist that he was the man to lead a turnaround of the company as head of a "new leadership team". Mr Green told us he accepted responsibility for the consequences of Carillion’s collapse, but that it was not for him to assign culpability. As leader of the board he was both responsible and culpable.

The report also recommended that the Insolvency Service should consider whether the former Carillion directors, including Green, could be disqualified from acting as a director.

The parliamentary process and findings have been questioned (by former Carillion directors) as lacking in objectivity and thoroughness, treating a highly complex situation in an incomplete manner. Former Carillion CEO Richard Howson, whose letters were published by the select committees on 12 July 2018, contends that Carillion was a victim of its public sector clients and that "any analysis as to the causes of the failure of Carillion is not complete without looking at the way in which government and the wider public sector procured services from Carillion and failed to administer payments".

In November 2020, the Financial Conduct Authority said some Carillion directors had "acted recklessly" and released "misleadingly positive" market updates before it collapsed. As a result, the FCA said it had sent notices to some (unnamed) former Carillion directors warning of possible enforcement action (possible sanctions include public censure, fines and suspensions from holding certain positions). In January 2021, the Insolvency Service said it would seek to ban eight former Carillion directors, including Green, from holding senior boardroom positions. A trial due to start on 16 October 2023 was cancelled after the Insolvency Service decided it was not in the public interest to pursue ex-chair Green and other directors.

== Honours ==
Green was appointed Commander of the Order of the British Empire (CBE) in the 2014 Birthday Honours for services to business and charity in the UK and South Africa.
