= Mark Carne =

British businessman

Mark Carne CBE
- Born: Helensburgh, Scotland
- Education: University of Exeter
- Occupation: Businessman
- Employer: Network Rail
- Title: Chief Executive
- Term: April 2014 – September 2018
- Predecessor: David Higgins

Mark Carne CBE is a Scottish businessman who served as executive vice-president for Shell in the Middle East and North Africa and was chief executive of Network Rail.

== Early life and education ==
Carne was born in Helensburgh, Scotland. He holds a BSc in engineering science from the University of Exeter and a Chartered Diploma in accounting and finance from the Cambridge College of Arts and Technology.

== Career ==
Early in Carne's career at Shell, he oversaw the company's response to the 1988 Piper Alpha disaster. After rising to oversee the company's operation in the North Sea he became managing director of Brunei Shell Petroleum (a Shell subsidiary). After 21 years, he moved to BG Group, where he became BG's managing director for Europe and Central Asia. Moving back to Shell, he became executive vice-president for the Middle East and North Africa, right through the Arab Spring years. In 2013, he was appointed chief executive of Network Rail.

== Network Rail ==
Carne was appointed chief executive of Network Rail in September 2013, and joined the company in January 2014 succeeding David Higgins. Carne's salary on appointment was £675,000—an increase on Higgins', though the overall remuneration package was smaller—which prompted criticism from unions, including the Transport Salaried Staffs' Association (one of the main unions for Network Rail staff), Associated Society of Locomotive Engineers and Firemen (the train drivers' union) and the National Union of Rail, Maritime and Transport Workers. Network Rail stated that the salary "was determined following an exhaustive and independent process which compared the salaries of chief executives in both the public and private sectors given Network Rail's unique position as a not-for-dividend, independent company". In an interview, Carne stated that his immediate focus would be on "safety, reliability, capacity, and cost", while also attempting to reduce spending.

Shortly after his appointment, Network Rail was reclassified as a public body in September 2014, which put the company's debt of £34 billion on the government balance sheet. This fundamental change meant that Network Rail could no longer borrow additional money to pay for cost increases as the scope of infrastructure projects matured, which had been the process assumed in the regulatory structure. As a result, cost increases in one project, led to others being controversially postponed or cancelled. This led to National Audit Office reports and Carne being questioned by the Public Accounts Committee, who concluded that "The 2014–2019 rail investment programme could not have been delivered within the budget which the Department, Network Rail and the Office of Rail & Road agreed". The investment programme was then replanned on the basis of available funds and realistic cost estimates. To also partially resolve the funding crisis, Carne proposed selling Network Rail's commercial estate, which was completed in September 2018 for £1.46 billion.

Carne reformed many aspects of Network Rail, devolving power to geographic route businesses, aligning incentives with train operating companies and creating a system operator to enhance strategic planning of the railway and to maximise use of available capacity. Improving safety was a constant theme - workforce injuries reduced by 50% over 2014–2019. During this time Network Rail were also delivering the "biggest upgrade since Victorian times" with £15 billion of new projects. Carne oversaw the opening of Reading station, Birmingham New Street station and the new Borders Railway in Scotland. He also accompanied the duke of Cambridge on the opening of the new London Bridge station.

Carne and the secretary of state for transport, Chris Grayling, gave back to back speeches to launch the Digital Railway strategy in May 2018. Carne had consistently advocated that moving from analogue signalling to digital signalling using the European Train Control System would reduce cost, increase capacity and reliability and improve safety.

Carne was presented with an award by 'Women in Rail' in 2018 in recognition of his industry leadership in diversity and inclusion. The number of women employed by Network Rail increased by 30% during CP5 (2014–2019)

In October 2017 the statement of funds for the next five-year Control Period (CP6) of £47.9 Bln (for England and Wales) was announced. This represented an increase in funding of 25% in the operations, maintenance and renewal of the railway, which came as a welcome surprise to some in the industry who had expected funding would be frozen or reduced.

In February 2018, Carne announced that he would step down as the chief executive in the summer of 2018; this would allow his successor to take control of the company for the next control period covering 2019–2024.

Carne was awarded a Commander of the Most Excellent Order of the British Empire for services to the rail industry in the 2018 Birthday Honours.

== Personal life ==
Carne is married with three children and lives in Tadley in Hampshire. He is an independent governor of Falmouth University and an advisory board member of Hypertunnel. He is a fellow of the Royal Academy of Engineering, a fellow of the Institution of Mechanical Engineers and a fellow of the Institution of Civil Engineers.
