= Iain Coucher =

British chairman (born 1961)

- Born: 22 August 1961 (age 64); St Albans, Hertfordshire
- Occupation: Chairman of Ofwat
- Known for: Chief executive of Atomic Weapons Establishment; Chief executive of Network Rail (2007–2010)

Iain Michael Coucher (born 22 August 1961) is the chairman of Ofwat, and was formerly the chief executive of the Atomic Weapons Establishment. He has worked as a consultant in the railway industry and held a number of management posts, most notably as the chief executive of Network Rail from 2007 to 2010.

== Early life ==
Coucher was born on 22 August 1961 in St Albans, Hertfordshire. He was brought up in Doncaster and Leeds, where his father, Brian, worked for the electricity generating board. He originally wanted to be a pilot in the Royal Air Force.

He was educated at Ashville College, a private boarding school in Harrogate, North Yorkshire. He boarded in Windermere House – part of Mallinson. Coucher was a good tennis player and represented the school tennis team.

After leaving Ashville in 1979, he attended Imperial College London where he studied Aeronautical engineering. He graduated in 1982 with a Bachelor of Science (BSc). Later he completed a Master of Business Administration (MBA) at Henley Management College (now called Henley Business School and part of the University of Reading).

== Career ==
He started his working life as an air-to-ground missile designer for Hunting Engineering from 1982 (since 2001 known as INSYS), before moving into IT services with the American consultancy group EDS in 1985 which led to working on the Oyster card. In 1999 he formed a transport consultancy, Coucher Pender, in partnership with a colleague Victoria Pender. Through the consultancy, they provided freelance management services to Tube Lines, one of the infrastructure maintenance companies under the London Underground public-private partnership in which the company was responsible for modernizing three tube lines, with Coucher serving as Tube Lines' Chief Executive from 1999 to 2001.

Coucher Pender provided consultancy for the creation of the railway infrastructure company Network Rail following the collapse of Railtrack in 2002. Coucher was made Deputy Chief Executive of Network Rail in 2002, stepping up to the role of Chief Executive in July 2007 following the retirement of Chief Executive John Armitt. In 2009, Network Rail paid Coucher an annual salary of £613,000.

Coucher announced on 17 June 2010 that he would step down as Chief Executive of Network Rail stating that this was for personal reasons. He remained in situ while his successor was sought. Coucher officially left Network Rail on 29 October 2010, accepting a payment from the company of £1.6 million. Coucher's successor, David Higgins, started on 1 February 2011.

Coucher was the subject of controversy regarding his management techniques following allegations in the media by the Transport Salaried Staffs' Association about bullying of Network Rail staff and financial impropriety involving Victoria Pender. An internal examination in 2010 by Network Rail cleared Coucher of any wrongdoing. An independent enquiry headed by Anthony White QC in 2011 further examined the claims, but also exonerated Coucher.

In January 2016, Coucher became Chief Executive of Atomic Weapons Establishment. In May 2022 he was appointed chairman of Ofwat.

== Personal life ==
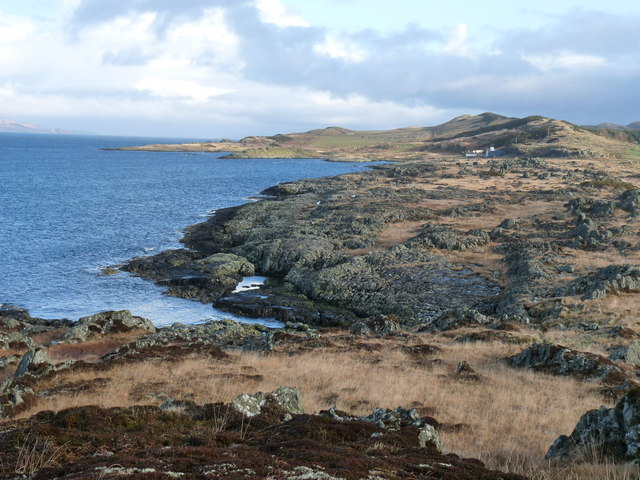
A view of Coucher's Scottish Estate

Married with a son (born February 1995) and daughter (born June 1998), Coucher lives in Argyll & Bute, Scotland and lists his car as an Aston Martin DB9. He married Tanya Nightingale in July 1993 in North Yorkshire. He was previously married. He enjoys cycling and birdwatching and owns a country house and 173-acre estate by Loch Sween on the Sound of Jura in Scotland which he has named "Iainland".

== Other sources ==
- Iain Coucher new chief at Network Rail
- Management Today August 2009
- Article in The Independent July 2009
