= Worthington Lakes =

Reservoirs in Wigan, Greater Manchester, England

Coordinates: 53°35′17″N 2°38′04″W

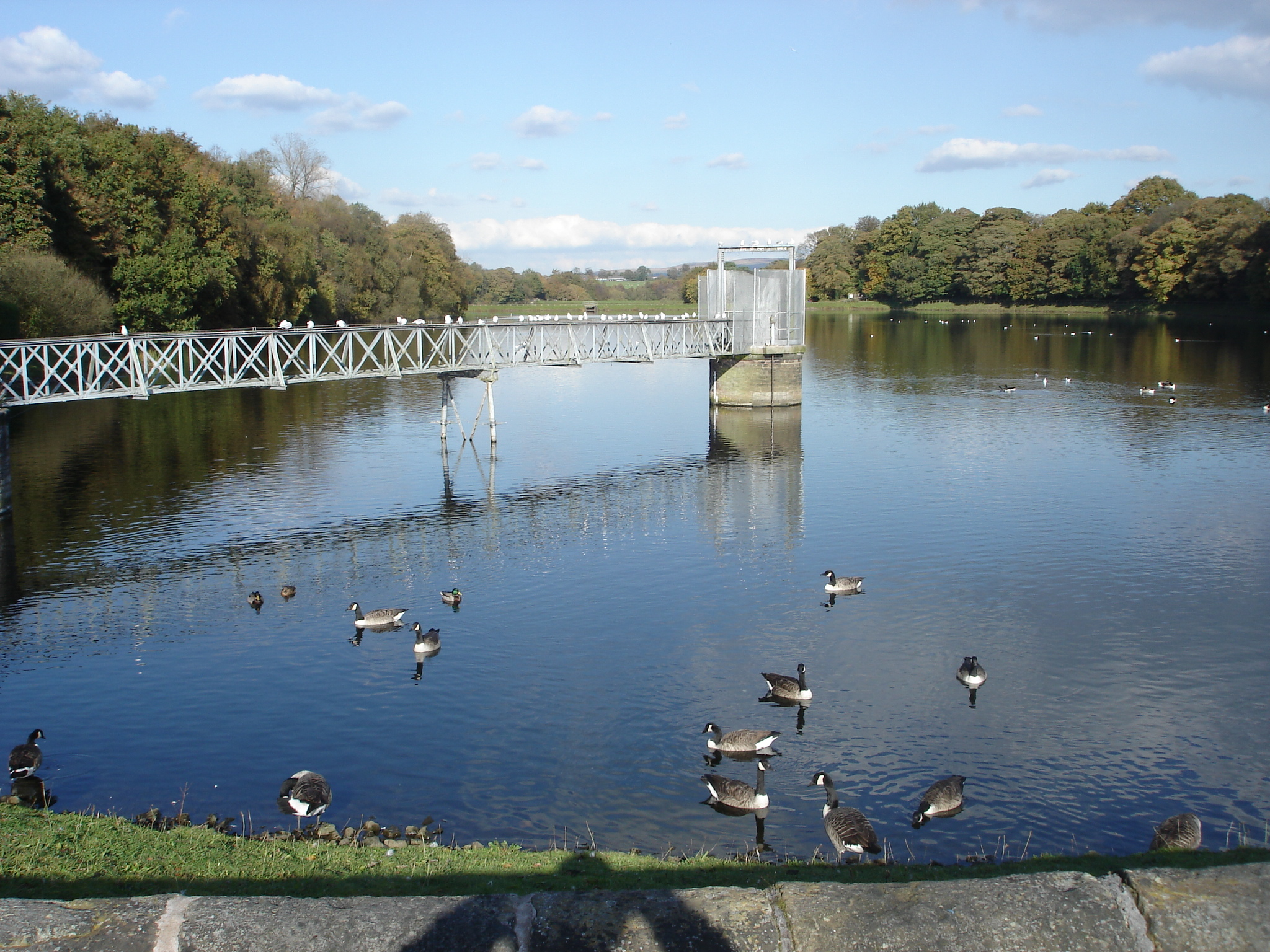
Worthington Reservoir

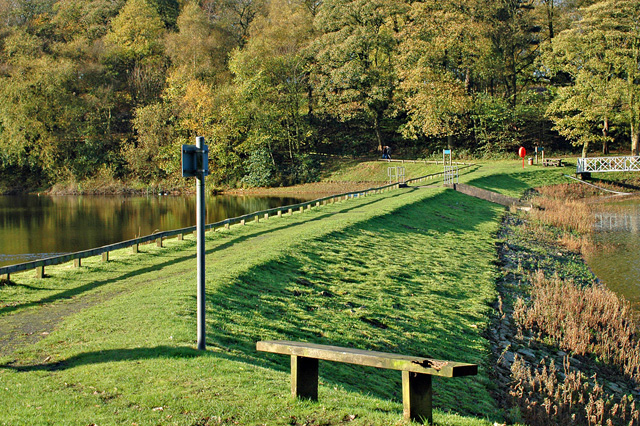
Dam between Worthington and Arley reservoirs

Worthington Lakes is a series of three reservoirs in the north of the borough of Wigan, Greater Manchester (from south to north: Worthington, Arley and Adlington) close to nearby Standish, off the A5106 Wigan to Chorley road in the north-west of England. They were constructed in the early 1860s to provide the clean water required by the rapidly growing town of Wigan.

Despite being situated in the Douglas Valley the water supply comes from the Parbold hills to the west as River Douglas was considered too polluted to be used for drinking water. The lakes, which are now in the ownership of United Utilities are today part of a 50-acre (20 ha) country park, with a nature reserve and accessible footpaths and used for informal recreation and for angling.
