= Epic Garden Music =

Studio album by Sad Lovers and Giants
- Released: September 1982
- Recorded: 1981–1982
- Studio: Spaceward Studios, Cambridge
- Genre: Post-punk; gothic rock
- Length: 29:04 (LP); 55:27 (CD)
- Label: Midnight Music
- Producer: Nick Ralph, Steve Burgess

Sad Lovers and Giants chronology
| Epic Garden Music (1982) | Feeding the Flame (1983) |

Professional ratings
Review scores
| Source | Rating |
|---|---|
| AllMusic | 4.5/5 stars |
| Record Collector | 4/5 stars |

Epic Garden Music is the debut studio album by English rock band Sad Lovers & Giants. It was released in September 1982 on the band's own record label, Midnight Music. The album originally charted on the UK Independent Albums Chart at number 21. In 1988 a CD reissue was released with 7 bonus tracks taken from three 7-inch releases.

== Track listing ==
Original vinyl issue

All tracks are written by Sad Lovers and Giants (Garce, Cliff Silver, Tristan Garel-Funk, David Wood, Nigel).

Side A: Seaside
| No. | Title | Length |
|---|---|---|
| 1. | "Echoplay" | 2:55 |
| 2. | "Clocktower Lodge" | 4:17 |
| 3. | "Clint" | 3:27 |
| 4. | "Lope" | 3:28 |

Side B: Countryside
| No. | Title | Length |
|---|---|---|
| 1. | "Cloud 9" | 3:21 |
| 2. | "ART (By Me)" | 3:04 |
| 3. | "Alice (Isn't Playing)" | 3:44 |
| 4. | "Far from the Sea" | 4:45 |

CD Reissue

| No. | Title | Length |
|---|---|---|
| 1. | "Imagination" | 5:40 |
| 2. | "Landslide" | 3:00 |
| 3. | "When I See You" | 3:16 |
| 4. | "Colourless Dream" | 4:44 |
| 5. | "Things We Never Did" | 4:07 |
| 6. | "Lost In A Moment" | 4:18 |
| 7. | "The Tightrope Touch" | 5:18 |
| 8. | "Echoplay" | 2:55 |
| 9. | "Clocktower Lodge" | 4:17 |
| 10. | "Clint" | 3:27 |
| 11. | "Lope" | 3:28 |
| 12. | "Cloud 9" | 3:21 |
| 13. | "ART (By Me)" | 3:04 |
| 14. | "Alice (Isn't Playing)" | 3:44 |
| 15. | "Far from the Sea" | 4:45 |

== Release ==
Epic Garden Music reached No. 21 on the UK Indie Chart.

== Personnel ==
- Garce – vocals
- Cliff Silver – bass guitar
- Tristan Garel-Funk – guitar
- David Wood – keyboards, saxophone
- Nigel – percussion

Technical

- Nick Ralph – production
- Steve Burgess – production
- Black Graphics – sleeve design
- Joe Bull – engineering
- Cliff Ash – cover photography
