= Cowm Reservoir =

Reservoir in Lancashire, England

Coordinates: 53°40′03″N 2°10′56″W

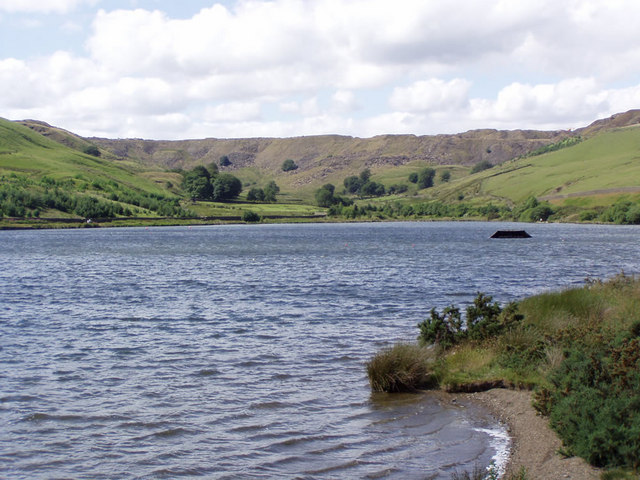
- Cowm Reservoir

Cowm Reservoir in Whitworth (near Rochdale, England) was built following the 1866 Rochdale Waterworks Act. The reservoir is owned by United Utilities.

In 1975, as a result of chemicals entering the reservoir from a massive tyre fire further up the catchment, alternative water supplies were made and the reservoir was drained. In 2009 United Utilities announced they were considering recommissioning the reservoir.

The reservoirs current primary use is for water sports and wider recreation. The reservoir is home to The Waterski Academy, who operate the Whitworth Waterski Centre from the old waterworks building at the east end of the dam.
