= Water Plus =

Water Plus Group Ltd
- Type: Private limited company
- Industry: Water industry
- Founded: 2016; 10 years ago
- Headquarters: Stoke-on-Trent, England, UK
- Area served: England, Scotland
- Key people: Jason Scagell (CEO);
- Products: Non-household water, wastewater
- Parent: United Utilities, Severn Trent Water
- Website: www.water-plus.co.uk

Water Plus Group Limited is a British business water retail services provider licensed in September 2016 for water supply and sewerage by OFWAT.

== History ==
Headquartered in Stoke-on-Trent, Water Plus Limited was incorporated as a 50/50 joint venture between United Utilities and Severn Trent water following approval by The Competition and Markets Authority in May 2016.

Water Plus was established to service the deregulated English business water market from 1 April 2017 as well as the Scottish business water market, which was deregulated on 1 April 2008.

In June 2018 it was announced that Water Plus's first CEO, Sue Amies-King, in role since March 2016, had been replaced by Andy Hughes, formerly of Severn Trent Water.

== Activities ==
Water Plus employs 500 people and serves more than 366,000 business customers, making it the largest business water retailer in England.
