= David Higgins (businessman) =

Australian-British businessman

Sir David Higgins
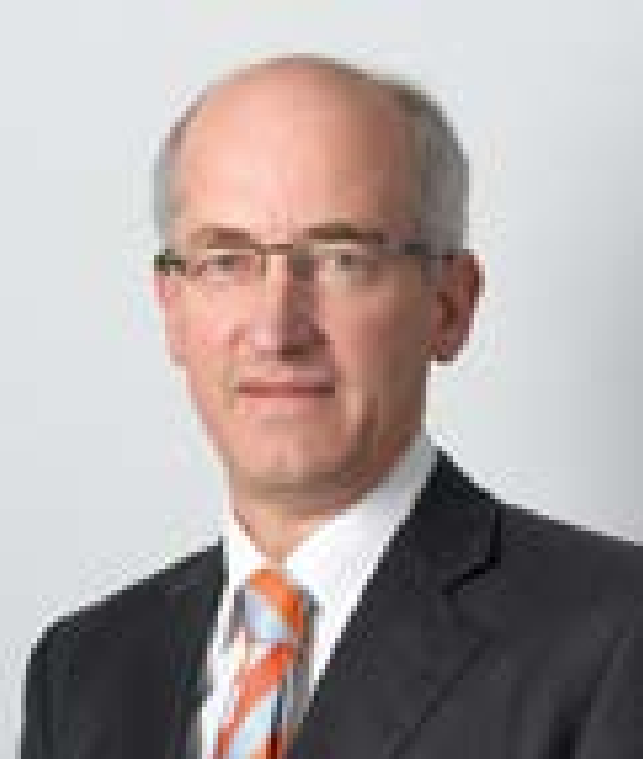
- Born: David Hartmann Higgins; 1954 (age 71–72); Brisbane, Queensland, Australia
- Occupation: Businessman
- Years active: 1977–present
- Title: Chairman of United Utilities (January 2020)
- Children: 2

Sir David Hartmann Higgins (born 1954) is an Australian-British businessman, the Chairman of United Utilities Group (since 1 January 2020), Chairman of Gatwick Airport (since 1 January 2017), and the former Non-Executive Chairman of High Speed Two (HS2) (March 2014 to July 2018). He was Chief Executive of the London 2012 Summer Olympics Delivery Authority and Network Rail.

== Career ==
Higgins was educated at Saint Ignatius' College, Riverview, then gained a degree in Civil engineering at the University of Sydney, residing at St John's College; and a diploma at the Securities Institute of Australia. After graduation, he worked in the United Kingdom and Africa, before returning to Australia in 1983, and joining Lendlease in 1985. In 1995, he was appointed managing director and chief executive, when Lendlease's developments included the 2000 Summer Olympics Sydney Olympic Park, and the Bluewater Shopping Centre in Kent England.

From March 2003, Higgins was Chief Executive of English Partnerships. Higgins was appointed Chief Executive Designate of the Olympic Delivery Authority from December 2005, and appointed Chief Executive with effect from 30 March 2006. In this role he was paid £394,999 a year, making him the highest paid Quango boss in the UK.

On 28 September 2010, it was announced that he was leaving the Olympic Delivery Authority to take up the role of chief executive of Network Rail, taking over from outgoing chief executive Iain Coucher, and with effect from February 2011. Higgins was widely respected for his work at Network Rail, including by the railway trade unions; he was succeeded as chief executive by Mark Carne in April 2014.

In 2014, Higgins took over as chairman of HS2 Ltd from Douglas Oakervee. At HS2, he successfully oversaw the introduction and subsequent passing of the 400-page London-Birmingham High Speed Rail hybrid bill enabling the compulsory purchase and land acquisition for securing the chosen alignment. As of 2015, Higgins was paid a salary of between £240,000 and £244,999 by the department, making him one of the 328 most highly paid people in the British public sector at that time. Higgins stood down from HS2 in 2018.

In 2017, Higgins took over from Roy McNulty as chairman of Gatwick Airport Limited.

In 2020, he succeeded Dr John McAdam as chairman of United Utilities Group and also stood down from his role as a non-executive director at the Commonwealth Bank of Australia, a role he had held since September 2014.

== Personal life ==
Higgins is married with two children. His hobbies include hiking and outdoor pursuits.

== Miscellanea ==
He was knighted in the 2011 Birthday Honours for services to regeneration.

In 2012, Higgins was the chair of the 2012 British Construction Industry Awards judging panel which celebrated its 25th anniversary of rewarding excellence in UK construction delivery.
