= High Rid Reservoir =

Reservoir in Greater Manchester, England

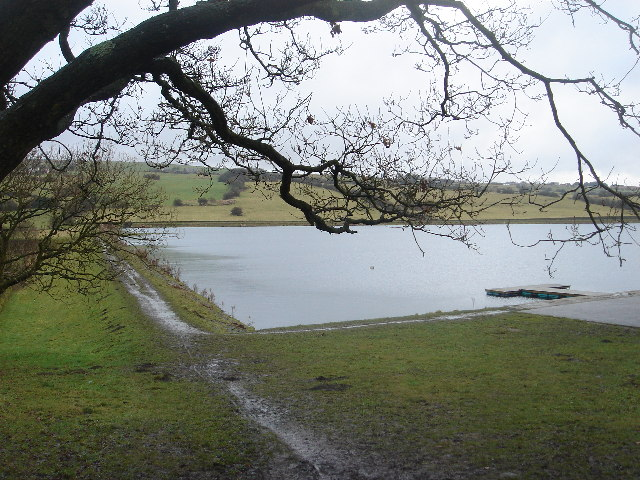

- Location within Greater Manchester
- Location: Greater Manchester, England
- Coordinates: 53°35′15″N 2°30′15″W

High Rid Reservoir is a small, stone-sided reservoir close to Lostock Junction. It lies three miles to the west of Bolton town centre, Greater Manchester.

== Public uses ==
As of August 2020, the site at High Rid is now operated by Lancashire Outdoor Activities Initiative who have exclusive access through its licence with United Utilities. LOAI is a charity who also operates the Anderton Centre on Lower Rivington Reservoir who offer opportunities for everyone to access the water, as well as advance education and improve quality of life.

Up until Oct 2017 High Rid Reservoir was used by Bolton Council, under licence from United Utilities, to stage activities for young people aged 13 to 19, and up to the age of 25 for those who have learning difficulties and/or disabilities. These activities include canoeing, kayaking, raft building and sailing. The reservoir is also used by Bolton Canoe Club for various activities.

== Ornithology ==
Despite its size, High Rid Reservoir is, and has been, home to many different kinds of bird. During the winter many different bird species, including little grebe, tufted duck and goldeneye can be found. Sightings, and short term residencies, of greater scaup, grey phalarope, ring-necked duck and long-tailed duck have also been documented.

== Tragedy ==
In December 2009, a man was found dead in the frozen High Rid Reservoir after it is thought he jumped in to rescue his dog.
