= Watermen: A Dirty Business =

- Genre: Factual
- Narrated by: Ralf Little
- Theme music composer: Richard Chance
- Country of origin: United Kingdom
- Original language: English
- No. of series: 1
- No. of episodes: 6 (list of episodes)

Production
- Executive producer: Hannah Wyatt
- Producer: Simon Kerfoot
- Running time: 60 minutes
- Production company: Mentorn Media

Original release
- Network: BBC Two; BBC Two HD
- Release: 15 April – 20 May 2014

Watermen: A Dirty Business is a British documentary television series that was first broadcast on BBC Two on 15 April 2014. The six-part series follows the employees of United Utilities.

== Production and location ==
On 16 January 2014, BBC Two commissioned Mentorn Media to make the six-part documentary series. It was commissioned by Maxine Watson. It was filmed in many locations such as The Oaks Primary School in Bolton, Bury and the rest of the North West

== Episode list ==
| No. | Title | Original release date | UK viewers (millions) |
|---|---|---|---|
| 1 | "Episode 1" | 16 April 2014 | TBA |
| 2 | "Episode 2" | 22 April 2014 | TBA |
| 3 | "Episode 3" | 29 April 2014 | TBA |
| 4 | "Episode 4" | 6 May 2014 | TBA |
| 5 | "Episode 5" | 13 May 2014 | TBA |
| 6 | "Episode 6" | 20 May 2014 | TBA |
