= Frans Hals (song) =

1987 single by McCarthy

Single by McCarthy
- B-side: The Fall; The Fall (remix) (12" only); Kill Kill Kill Kill (12" only); Frans Hals (version) (12" only)
- Released: March 1987
- Genre: Indie pop
- Label: Pink Label
- Songwriter(s): Malcolm Eden

McCarthy singles chronology
"Red Sleeping Beauty" (1986)	"Frans Hals" (1987)	"The Well of Loneliness" (1987)

"Frans Hals" is a single by McCarthy released in March 1987; their last on Pink Label. The b-sides were "The Fall (remix)" and "Kill Kill Kill Kill" and "Frans Hals (version)".

The single is not on any of the group's three studio albums. It can be found on the releases A La Guillotine and That's All Very Well But....

Dutch Golden Age painter Frans Hals was the subject of the song and the lyrics were inspired by John Berger's comments on Hals in his 1972 book, Ways of Seeing.
