= Feeding the Flame =

Studio album by Sad Lovers & Giants
- Released: 1983
- Recorded: Spaceward Studios
- Genre: Post-punk; gothic rock
- Length: 44:26 (LP); 66:07 (CD)
- Label: Midnight Music
- Producer: Nick Ralph, Steve Burgess

Sad Lovers & Giants chronology
Epic Garden Music (1982)	Feeding the Flame (1983)	Total Sound (1986)

Feeding the Flame is the second studio album by English rock band Sad Lovers & Giants. It was released in 1983 on the band's record label, Midnight Music. A CD reissue with 4 bonus tracks was released in 1988.

== Track listing ==
Original vinyl issue

All lyrics are written by Garce; all music is composed by Simon Allard and Tristan Garel-Funk, except as noted.

Side A
No.	Title	Music	Length
1.	"Big Tracks Little Tracks"	Cliff Silver, David Wood, Nigel Pollard, Allard, Garel-Funk	3:32
2.	"On Another Day"		4:57
3.	"Sleep (Is For Everyone)"		5:08
4.	"Vendetta"		4:37
5.	"Man of Straw"		4:36

Side B
No.	Title	Music	Length
1.	"Strange Orchard"	Wood, Allard	6:09
2.	"Burning Beaches"	Silver, Wood, Pollard, Garel-Funk	4:30
3.	"Your Skin and Mine"	Pollard, Allard, Garel-Funk	5:19
4.	"In Flux"		5:38

CD Reissue

No.	Title	Length
1.	"Imagination"	6:24
2.	"Cow Boys"	5:34
3.	"3 Lines"	3:13
4.	"Big Tracks Little Tracks"	3:31
5.	"On Another Day"	5:01
6.	"Sleep (Is For Everyone)"	5:04
7.	"Vendetta"	4:37
8.	"Man of Straw"	6:18
9.	"Close To The Sea"	4:44
10.	"Strange Orchard"	6:11
11.	"Burning Beaches"	4:30
12.	"Your Skin and Mine"	5:21
13.	"In Flux"	5:57

== Critical reception ==
Professional ratings
Review scores
Source	Rating
AllMusic	4.5/5 stars
Record Collector	4/5 stars

Trouser Press classified the album as "distressing".

== Personnel ==
- Garce – vocals
- Cliff Silver – bass guitar, keyboards
- Tristan Garel-Funk – guitar, percussion, backing vocals
- David Wood – keyboards, saxophone, percussion
- Nigel Pollard – drums, percussion

Technical

- Nick Ralph – production
- Steve Burgess – production
- Joe Bull – engineering
- Trev Wright – sleeve layout (label lettering)
- Jonz – mastering (vinyl cutting)
- Andrée Jenni – album cover photography
