= United Utilities =

British water company

United Utilities Group plc
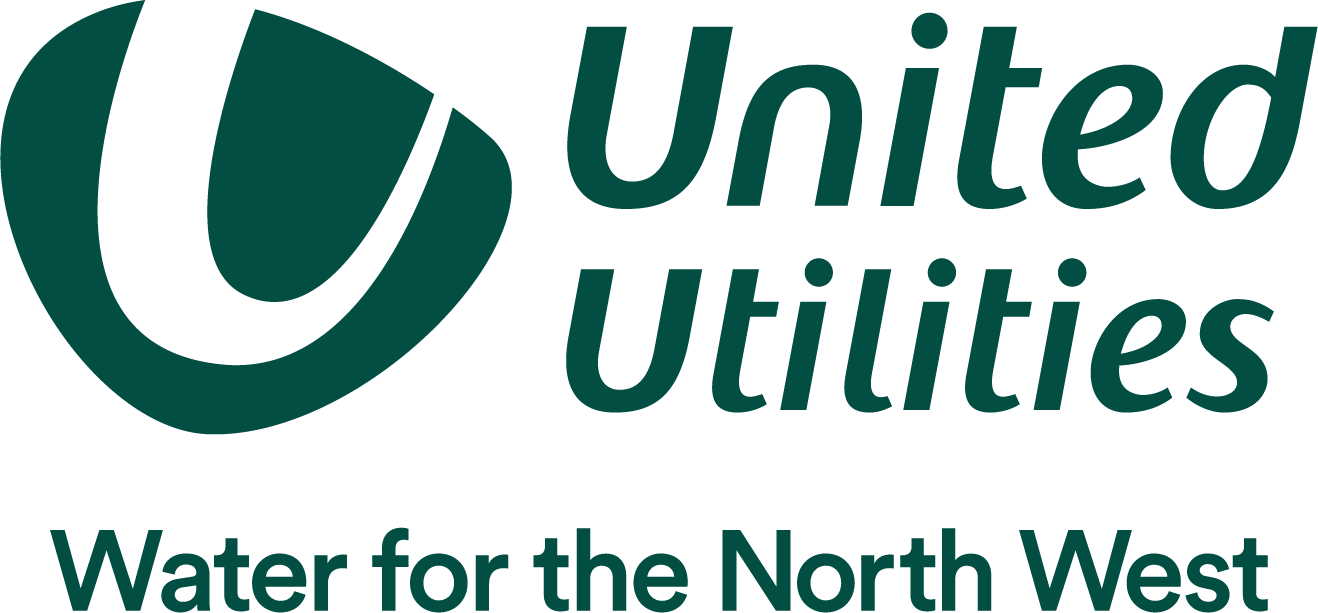
- Type: Public limited company
- Traded as: LSE: UU. FTSE 100 Component
- Industry: Water industry
- Founded: 1995; 31 years ago
- Headquarters: Warrington, England, UK,
- Area served: North West England
- Key people: David Higgins (Chairperson); Philip Nevill Green (CEO)
- Products: Drinking water; Recycled wastewater
- Production output: 2.0 Gl/day (drinking); 2.0 Gl/day (recycled)
- Services: Water supply; Sewage treatment
- Revenue: ▲£2,616.3 million (2026)
- Operating income: ▲£1,099.4 million (2026)
- Net income: ▲£586.8 million (2026)
- Website: www.unitedutilities.com

United Utilities Group plc (UU) is the United Kingdom's largest listed water company. It was founded in 1995 as a result of the merger of North West Water and NORWEB. The group manages the regulated water and waste water network in North West England, which includes Cumbria, Greater Manchester, Lancashire, Merseyside, most of Cheshire and a small area of Derbyshire, which have a combined population of more than seven million.

The United Utilities Group was the electricity distribution network operator for the North West until 2010, when its electricity subsidiary was sold to Electricity North West. United Utilities' headquarters are in Warrington, England, and the company has more than 5,000 direct employees. Its shares are listed on the London Stock Exchange and it is a constituent of the FTSE 100 Index.

North West England is the wettest region in England, and water hardness across the region is soft to very soft.

== History ==
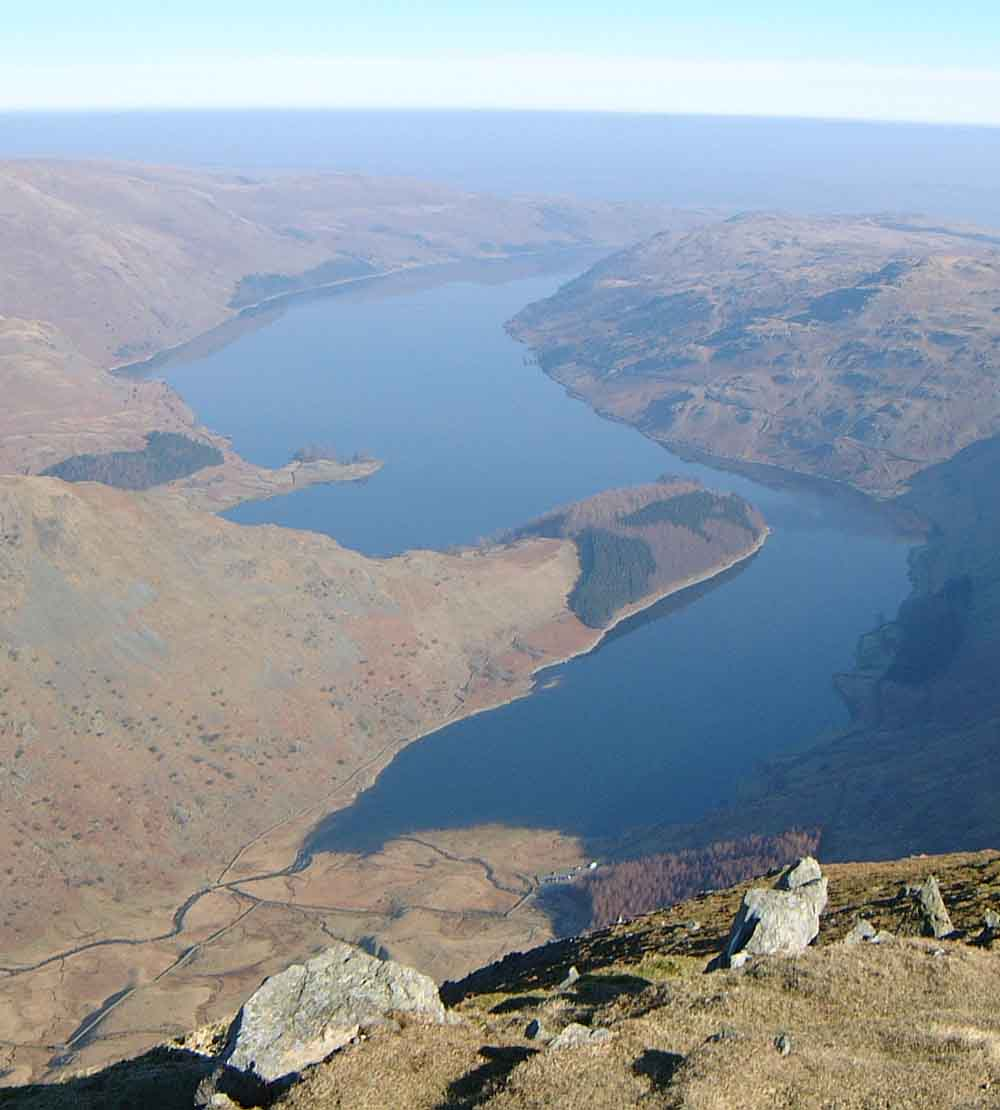
Haweswater Reservoir in Cumbria, constructed by the Manchester Corporation in 1929

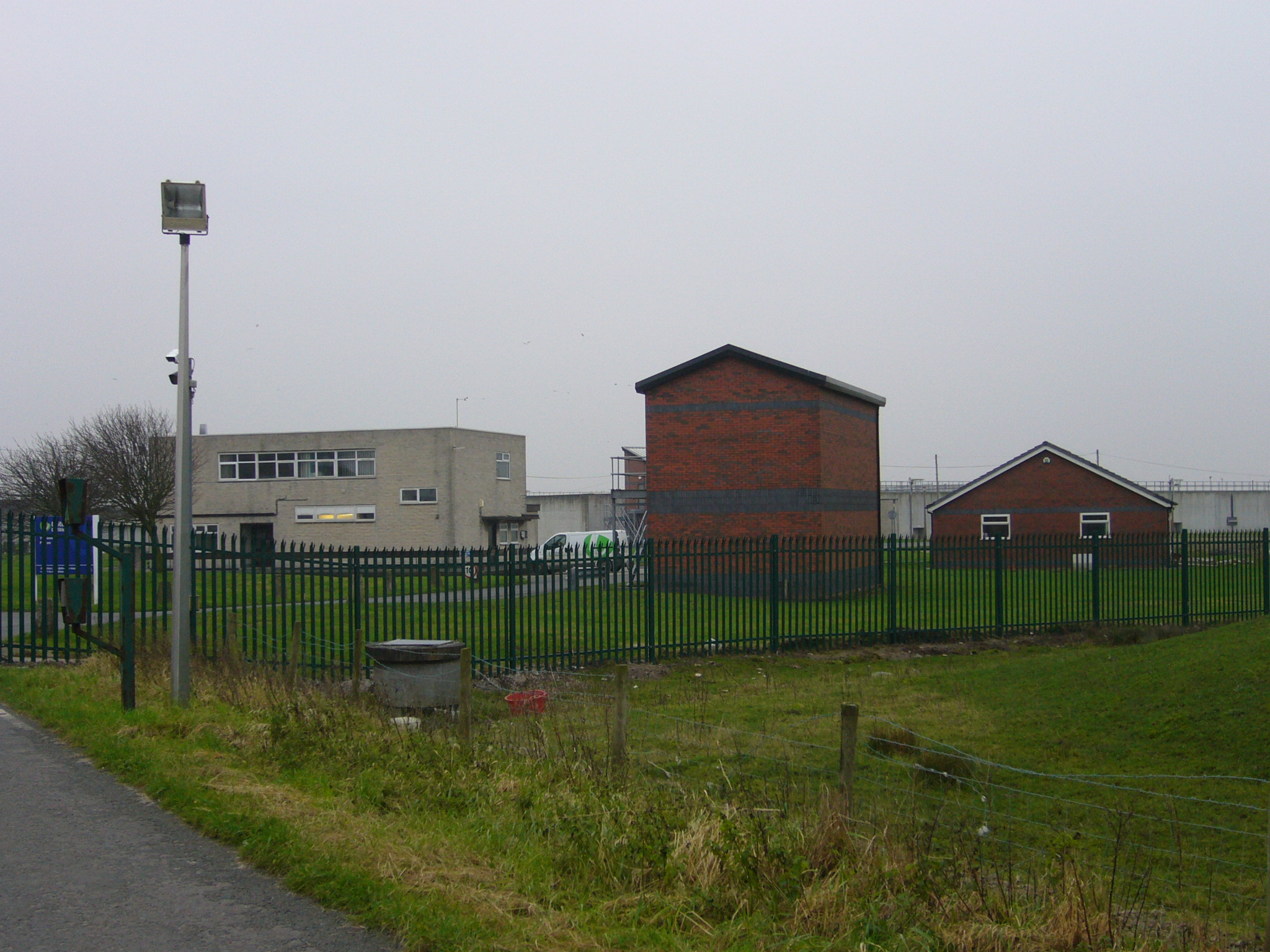
United Utilities' wastewater treatment plant for Preston, Lancashire

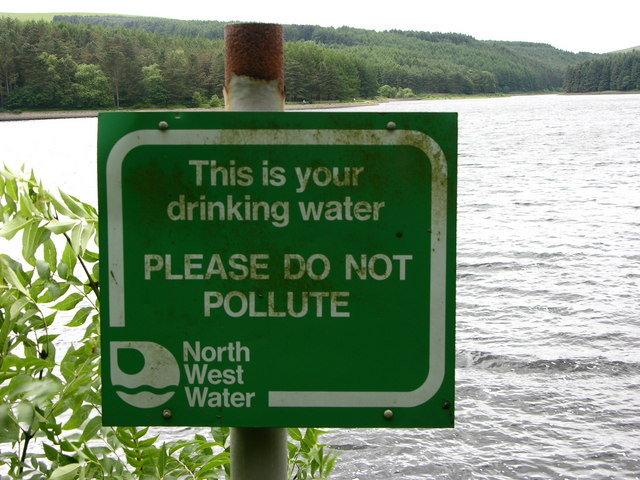
A sign with the former North West Water branding

In 1989 the North West Water Authority, which was responsible for the provision of water to the North West of England, was privatised and became North West Water Group plc. In 1995, the company acquired NORWEB plc, the then regional electricity distributor and supplier, and on 1 April 1996 changed its name to United Utilities plc.

In January 1998, United Utilities listed on the New York Stock Exchange, but delisted its shares in May 2007. In 2000, the North West Water and NORWEB branding was phased out in favour of United Utilities, the rebranding was completed by the end of 2001. The company sold some of the businesses it had acquired, its telecoms business, Your Communications was sold in February 2006, and Vertex in March 2007.

In December 2007, United Utilities sold its electricity distribution network assets to North West Electricity Networks (Jersey) Limited, a joint venture between funds run by Colonial First State and JPMorgan Chase. Electricity North West became the licensed Distribution Network Operator for the north west of England as a result.

United Utilities operated and maintained the regional electricity network on behalf of Electricity North West until 2010, when Electricity North West bought the electricity network operations and maintenance arm from United Utilities to establish one Group.

In October 2011, United Utilities was selected as the preferred bidder by Severn Trent Water to purchase the Lake Vyrnwy estate for £11 million. United Utilities later withdrew from the bidding process. In February 2012, United Utilities proposed a national water pipeline linking water sources in Manchester to London. In April 2016, United Utilities received an 18-year loan of £500m from The European Investment Bank to support investment across the North West.

In May 2016, the Competition and Markets Authority granted United Utilities and Severn Trent Water approval to create a new joint venture company in preparation for the water market deregulation. In June 2016, United Utilities and Severn Trent Water formed Water Plus, in readiness to provide the retail services for their non-household customers.

In May 2019, the company announced the appointment of David Higgins as a non-executive director and to succeed Dr John McAdam as chairman.

In April 2022, Louise Beardmore appointed chief executive at United Utilities. As a result, five of the six top positions in UK water companies listed on the FTSE were held by women.

== Operations ==
United Utilities currently supplies water to a population of 7.3 million people across the North West.

The company also manages 48,000 miles (78,000 km) wastewater pipes, which take sewage from 7.3 million people for treatment at nearly 600 wastewater treatment works. It also operates 37 renewable energy facilities.

== Reservoirs ==
United Utilities owns some 166 water supply reservoirs, various river and stream intakes, as well as lake abstractions and numerous groundwater sources, to supply the region. Some reservoirs operated by the company are outside the North West such as the Longdendale Chain in Derbyshire, which were constructed by the Manchester Corporation in the 19th century, and remain networked to the North West's water supply. The principal reservoirs are as follows:

Cumbria

- Haweswater Reservoir
- Thirlmere

Cheshire

- Lamaload Reservoir
- Macclesfield Forest
  - Trentabank Reservoir
  - Ridgegate Reservoir

Derbyshire

- Longdendale Chain
  - Woodhead Reservoir
  - Torside Reservoir
  - Bottoms Reservoir
  - Arnfield Reservoir
- Hurst Reservoir
- Goyt Valley
  - Errwood Reservoir
  - Fernilee Reservoir

Greater Manchester

- Belmont Reservoir
- High Rid Reservoir
- Rumworth Lodge Reservoir
- Gorton Reservoirs
- Heaton Park Reservoir
- Dove Stone Reservoir
- Chew Reservoir
- Greenfield Reservoir
- Strinesdale Reservoir
- Yeoman Hey Reservoir
- Ashworth Moor Reservoir
- Blackstone Edge Reservoir
- Kitcliffe Reservoir
- Norman Hill Reservoir
- Ogden Reservoir
- Piethorne Reservoir
- Rooden Reservoir
- Watergrove Reservoir
- Audenshaw Reservoirs
- Godley Reservoir
- Worthington Lakes

Lancashire

- The Rivington Chain.
  - Anglezarke Reservoir
  - Upper Rivington Reservoir
  - Lower Rivington Reservoir
  - Yarrow Reservoir
  - Upper Roddlesworth Reservoir
  - Lower Roddlesworth Reservoir
  - Rake Brook Reservoir
  - High Bullough Reservoir
- Clowbridge
- Cowm Reservoir
- Haslingden Grane
- Stocks Reservoir
- Wayoh Reservoir

== Service problems ==
In May 2010, a burst water main cut 15,000 customers in Moreton, Leasowe and Wallasey off water for 3 days. In November 2019, a burst pipe in a local treatment works disrupted water supply in the CH 41/42/43/63 areas and bottled water supply points were set up.

=== Water and land contamination ===
On 7 August 2015, cryptosporidium, a water-borne parasite that can cause diarrhoea and vomiting, had been detected in the water supply to Blackpool, Chorley, Fylde, Preston, South Ribble and Wyre affecting more than 300,000 customers. No cases of cryptosporidiosis were reported and by introducing of ultra-violet treatment units "boil water" notices could be lifted in some areas. Initial investigations by United Utilities and the Drinking Water Inspectorate had not identified the cause. Later the root cause was identified as run-off water from agricultural land following severe rainfall.

On 6 September 2015, the water supply was declared free from contamination, and restrictions were lifted. United Utilities was subsequently fined £300,000 at Preston Crown Court on 10 October 2017 for supplying water unfit for human consumption, with an additional £150,000 costs. It paid around £18 million in compensation to its customers. United Utilities held a number of seminars following this event to outline steps it had taken following the incident and share lessons with other water companies.

In 2023, it was reported that an area of council land in Stockport that had been earmarked for development into amenity woodland had been so contaminated by sewage discharge that it was unsafe to proceed and the plans had to be dropped. The same report noted that United Utilities were the worst-polluting water company in the UK in 2022, with "10 of the country’s 20 pipes that spilled the most sewage in 2022 [being] owned by United Utilities", and that they had discharged raw sewage into the River Ellen in Cumbria for almost 7,000 hours that year. The Environment Agency stated that United Utilities released raw sewage into rivers for over 425,491 hours in 2022, and that England's largest lake, Windermere in the Lake District, received sewage from storm overflows for 246 days that year. It was reported in figures submitted to the Environment Agency by the water industry that in the following year, 2023, over 33% of United Utilities outflows discharged raw sewage 60 times or more into waterways, and over the course of the year United Utilities discharged sewage into waterways for a total of 656,014 hours, representing a 54% increase in its sewage discharge compared with 2022.

On the evening of 28 February 2024 until the morning of 29 February, United Utilities pumped almost 10 million litres (2.2 million imperial gallons) of raw sewage illegally into the middle of Windermere, after pumps at the pumping station in Bowness malfunctioned. The company failed to report this to the Environment Agency until 13 hours after the incident began.

=== Intrusion into the aquifer ===
In 2023 the company was fined £800,000 for illegally removing 22 billion litres (4.8 billion imperial gallons) of water from the Lancashire aquifer.

== See also ==
- Watermen: A Dirty Business, 2014 documentary television series following employees of United Utilities
