= McCarthy (band) =

British indie pop band (1985–1990)

Background information
- Origin: Barking, Greater London, England
- Genres: Indie pop
- Years active: 1985–1990
- Labels: Wall of Salmon, Pink Label, Midnight Music, September, Cherry Red
- Past members: Tim Gane; Malcolm Eden; John Williamson; Gary Baker; Lætitia Sadier

McCarthy were a British indie pop band, formed in Barking, Greater London, England in 1984 by schoolmates Malcolm Eden (voice and guitar) and Tim Gane (lead guitar) with John Williamson (bass guitar) and Gary Baker (drums). Lætitia Sadier later joined the band on vocals for their final studio album.

They mixed a melodic style, dominated by Gane's 12-string guitar playing, with Eden's overtly political lyrics, often satirical in tone, which reflected the band's far-left leanings.

== History ==
Malcolm Eden, Tim Gane and John Williamson met at Barking Abbey Comprehensive School. Gane was originally a drummer, but was initially taught to play guitar by Eden, who also taught Williamson to play bass. Eden and Gane were fans of punk groups such as the Sex Pistols, The Clash, and Buzzcocks, and they covered their songs in small gigs as teenagers. Baker joined in 1984, and with the new line-up deciding on the name McCarthy (a reference to American politician Joe McCarthy), they released a self-financed first single, "In Purgatory", in 1985. The band were signed by the Pink Label, releasing two further singles, "Red Sleeping Beauty" and "Frans Hals". The band had a track included on the NME C86 album ("Celestial City").

Their debut album, I Am a Wallet, was released in 1987. DJ John Peel featured the album in a BBC Radio 1 session. Because of Eden's Marxist political views, the band were frequently brought up with other left-wing acts like Billy Bragg and The Redskins. I Am a Wallet has since been described by Nicky Wire as "the most perfect record, a Communist manifesto with tunes", and was rated by James Dean Bradfield as his top British album of all time.

Two further singles were issued in early 1988, followed by the album The Enraged Will Inherit the Earth.

A year later, they released a third album, Banking, Violence and the Inner Life Today, with Lætitia Sadier (Gane's partner at the time) on vocals. Eden stated that there was no need to continue with the band, believing that their creativity peaked with the album. The band's final show was at the London School of Economics in 1990.

The band had two songs in John Peel's Festive Fifty: "Frans Hals" in 1987 (#35), and "Should the Bible Be Banned" in 1988 (#38).

After their disbandment, Gane and Sadier immediately formed Stereolab, while Eden formed the short-lived Herzfeld. Baker went on to a career in radiography, before going on to work for The Guardian. Williamson went on to work for music publisher BMG and Domino Records.

== Influence ==
McCarthy were a major early influence on Manic Street Preachers, who covered three of their songs: "We Are All Bourgeois Now" appeared as a hidden track on their Know Your Enemy album; "Charles Windsor" appeared as a b-side on their Life Becoming a Landslide EP; and "Red Sleeping Beauty" appeared on their single "Autumnsong".

Nicky Wire has commented on the band and specifically the album I Am a Wallet: "McCarthy - the great lost band of the '80s they redesigned my idea of politics and pop, it could be intelligent, it could be beautiful. They were frail, tragic, romantic idealists. The songs soothed your body but exercised your brain. They were my education, my information and they are partly to blame for the realisation of the Manic Street Preachers. I still fall in love with this album every six months, it makes me feel guilty because it's so good".

== Discography ==
Chart placings shown are from the UK Indie Chart.

=== Studio albums ===
- I Am a Wallet (September Records; November 1987) (#7)
- The Enraged Will Inherit the Earth (Midnight Music; March 1989) (#5)
- Banking, Violence and the Inner Life Today (Midnight Music; April 1990)

=== Singles/EPs ===
- "In Purgatory" [b/w "The Comrade Era", "Something Wrong Somewhere"] (Wall of Salmon; 1985)
- "Red Sleeping Beauty" [b/w "From the Damned", "The Comrade Era", "For the Fat Lady"] (Pink Label; October 1986)
- "Frans Hals" [b/w "The Fall (remix)", "Kill Kill Kill Kill", "Frans Hals (version)"] (Pink Label; March 1987) (#4)
- "The Well of Loneliness" [b/w "Unfortunately", "Bad Dreams", "Someone Worse Off","Antiamericancretin"] (September Records; September 1987) (#10)
- "This Nelson Rockefeller" [b/w "The Fall" (new version),"The Funeral" (new version),"The Enemy Is At Home" [new version of "For the Fat Lady"],"The Way of the World" (new version)] (September Records; February 1988) (#9)
- "Should the Bible Be Banned" [b/w "Saint Francis Amongst the Mortals", "We Are All Bourgeois Now"] (September Records; April 1988) (#9)
- "Keep an Open Mind or Else" [b/w "The New Left Review #1","Two Criminal Points of View"] (Midnight Music; February 1989) (#10)
- At War EP ["Boy Meets Girl So What" (version),"All Your Questions Answered", "New Left Review #2","The Lion Will Lie Down with the Lamb"] (Midnight Music; May 1989) (#16)
- "Get a Knife Between Your Teeth" [b/w "Nobody Could Care Less About Your Private Lives", "With One Eye on Getting Their Pay", "Can the Haves Use Their Brains"] (Midnight Music; March 1990)

=== Compilations ===
- A La Guillotine! (Danceteria; February 1988)
- That's All Very Well But... (Midnight Music/Cherry Red; 1996)

== Radio sessions ==
- John Peel Session (12 November 1986)
1. "A Child Soon in Chains"
2. "Frans Hals"
3. "An MP Speaks"
4. "Antinature"
- Janice Long Session (8 July 1987)
1. "The Wicked Palace Revolution"
2. "The Vision of Peregrine Worsthorne"
3. "The Well of Loneliness"
4. "Monetaries"
- John Peel Session (28 October 1987)
1. "Charles Windsor"
2. "The Funeral"
3. "Should the Bible Be Banned"
4. "This Nelson Rockefeller"
- John Peel Session (1 January 1988)
1. "The Myth of the North–South Divide"
2. "I'm Not a Patriot But..."
3. "Keep an Open Mind or Else"
4. "The Lion Will Lie Down with the Lamb"
