= The Snake Corps =

English gothic rock band

The Snake Corps are an English gothic rock band based in London, England.

== History ==
The Snake Corps were formed in 1984 by members of Sad Lovers & Giants. Tristan Garel-Funk and Nigel Pollard conceived the band, but Pollard left prior to recording the first album. Vocalist Marc Lewis responded to an advert in Melody Maker for a singer and shared a flat with Garel-Funk, the pair recruited Liam McGuinness on Bass and Jon Greville of Rudimentary Peni on drums.

The music was an original fusion of post-punk, indie rock and a dynamic guitar and vocal soundscape. Not unlike Sad Lovers & Giants before them, they focused on creating dreamy rock anthems and at least partly, discarded the post-punk influences of many their contemporaries. Consequently, the band found that the European market was more aligned to their musical style and they toured abroad extensively.

Distancing themselves from Britain and shunning UK dates meant that the regular indie labels were largely uninterested. However, Midnight Music, who had been the home of early SL&G, signed the band. A new album was already recorded, but this did not surface for some years, eventually appearing on the small Ophidian label, an offshoot of Rotator Records, thanks to a friend of Garel-Funk. The word Ophidian can mean 'snake-like'.

The Snake Corps reformed in 2010. Carl Jones joined on guitar, Liam McGuinness rejoined on Bass with a new drummer Richie Harris. The Snake Corps made a triumphant return to live performance with a gig in Salamandra Venue Barcelona, Spain on 18 September 2010.

The reformed Snake Corps with Marc on lead vocals were busy in 2011, playing gigs in London and Berlin with Steve Williams on lead guitar. Now with 3 original members they also played several sell out gigs in Spain in the autumn of 2011 (including the Rock Kitchen in Madrid) these now featured Simon Meek on keyboards, with Liam McGuinness moving to guitar, and original bass player Jim Blanchard also rejoining the band, with Dave Vigay on drums.

The band played London's 02 Academy in Islington on 21 April 2012 supporting Chameleons Vox and had their best gig since reforming 2 years before.

Carl Jones joined again on guitar for gigs in Spain in 2014 (Valencia) and 2015 (Tarragona) and left the band in 2016. They released a new EP featuring four new songs in September 2016. Gigs followed in Berlin in October and Madrid in November. They played their first-ever gig in Italy in Salerno on 17 April and play with their old friends the Chameleons Vox in Brighton on 17 May.

Also in 2017 Valencia ( Spain) Rome and Carpi (Italy), in 2018 Hilden (Germany), Barcelona (Spain) and Turin (Italy), in 2019 Valencia and Tarragona (Spain), in 2022 LiveAmSee festival in Meschede (Germany), in September Madrid (Spain), and in 2023 LiveAmSee festival in Meschede (Germany) in June, October Return to the Batcave festival in Wrocław (Poland).

Carl Jones re-joined on Guitar in 2025 after a break of 10 years. The band played three dates in England as special guests of B-Movie and the band enjoyed great reaction from the audiences. The band play Athens for the first time in October and are looking forward to a tour with Pink Turns Blue in 2026.

== Current lineup ==
- Marc Lewis – Vocals
- Carl Jones – Guitar
- Jim Blanchard – Bass
- David Vigay – Drums

== Previous members ==
- Tristan Garel-Funk/Carl Jones/Steve Williams/Liam McGuinness -Guitars
- David Wood/Ian Gibson/Simon Meek/Will Hicks – Keyboards
- Nigel Pollard/Jon Greville/Richard Harris – Drums

== Discography ==
=== Albums ===
- 1985: Flesh On Flesh – Midnight Music – CHIME 00.14CD
- 1990: Smother Earth – Midnight Music – CHIME 00.52CD
- 1993: 3rd Cup – Ophidian – OPHD 3001

=== EPs ===
- 2016: "The Ocean Calls" – The Snake Corporation

=== Singles ===
- 1985: "Science Kills" – Midnight Music – DONG 13
- 1986: "Victory Parade" – Midnight Music – DONG 19
- 1987: "Testament" – Midnight Music – DONG 30
- 1989: "Calling You" "This is Seagull" – Midnight Music – DONG 50
- 1990: "Colder Than The Kiss" – Midnight Music – DONG 60
- 1992: "Some Other Time" – Midnight Music – DONG 75
- 2019: "She'll Rise"
- 2021: “Ghost”

=== Compilations ===
- 1990: More Than The Ocean – Midnight Music – CHIME 1.12CD
- 1993: Spice 1984–1993: The Very Best Of – Anagram Records – CDMGRAM 97
