= Sad Lovers & Giants =

English rock band from Watford, Hertfordshire

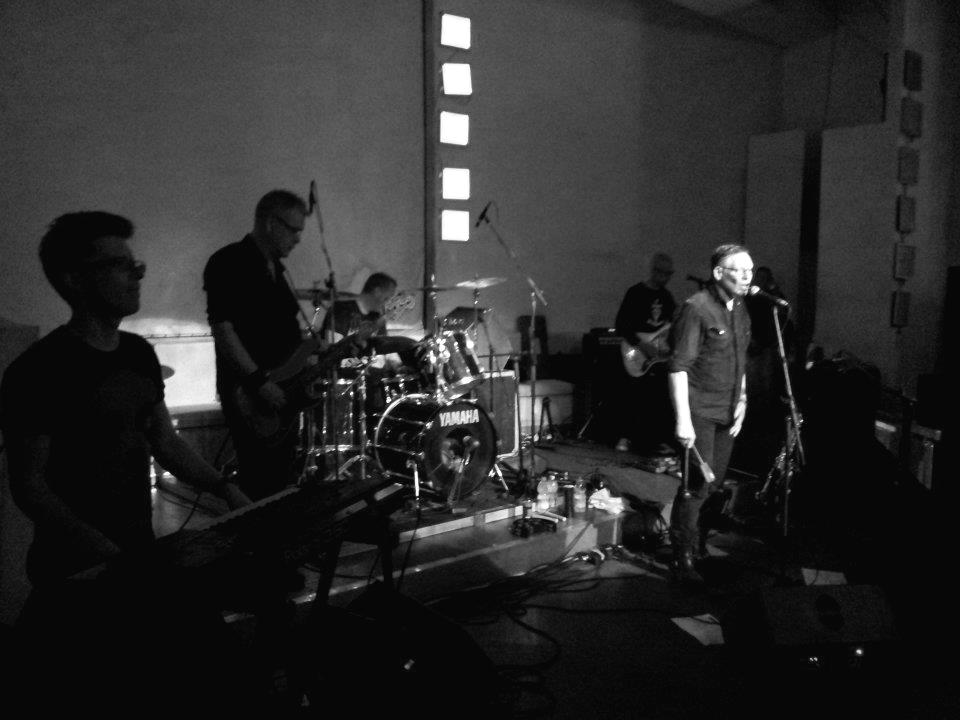
- Sad Lovers, live in Salerno, Italy, 2012

Background information
- Origin: Rickmansworth, Hertfordshire, England
- Genres: Post-punk; gothic rock; neo-psychedelia; folk rock
- Years active: 1980–1983, 1986–1991, 2002–2003, 2009–present
- Label: Midnight Music
- Members: Garçe Allard; Tony McGuinness; Nigel Pollard; Ian Gibson; Will Hicks; Jack Dawkins
- Past members: Tristan Garel-Funk; David Wood; Cliff Silver; Juliet Sainsbury
- Website: https://sadloversandgiants.co.uk/

Sad Lovers & Giants are an English rock band from Watford, Hertfordshire, England, which formed in 1980. Their sound blends post-punk, atmospheric keyboards and psychedelia.

== History ==
The original lineup included vocalist Garçe (Simon) Allard, guitarist Tristan Garel-Funk, bassist Cliff Silver, drummer Nigel Pollard and keyboardist/saxophonist David Wood.

Following their debut EP Clé and the "Colourless Dream" single, both issued in 1981, they released their debut studio album, Epic Garden Music in 1982. It reached No. 21 in the UK Independent Albums Chart.

During this initial period they recorded a John Peel Session for the BBC, and a live concert for Radio Netherlands Worldwide in 1983 (later released as the album Total Sound in 1986). Live performances included headline dates at UK colleges and clubs with occasional trips to Europe, although they did support the Sound at a major London venue on the day that Epic Garden Music entered the chart. The singles "Lost in a Moment" (1982) and "Man of Straw" (1983) both made the UK Independent Singles Chart, reaching No. 48 and No. 31, respectively.

European interest in the band grew, and with the 1983 release of second album Feeding the Flame, they toured Germany and the Netherlands, gaining a dedicated fanbase. Tensions within the band caused a split, with Garel-Funk and Pollard leaving to form the Snake Corps.

During a hiatus, their label Midnight Music released the In the Breeze collection in 1984, which included one of their previously unreleased signature tunes, "Three Lines".

SL&G returned in 1987 with an updated line-up including original members Allard and Pollard along with newcomers Tony McGuinness (guitar), Juliet Sainsbury (keyboards) and Ian Gibson (bass), releasing a new album that year, The Mirror Test.

As interest abroad grew, the band performed extensively in the Netherlands, Spain and France, and headlined at the Marquee Club in London. Original bassist Silver returned, replacing Gibson, and they released a fourth studio album, Headland, in 1990.

After the 1991 release of Treehouse Poetry, Midnight Music folded and the band split once again, coming together occasionally for gigs supporting And Also the Trees at London's Marquee Club and Electric Ballroom.

E-mail from Eternity, a best-of compilation, was released by the record label Cherry Red in 1996, after the company picked up the Midnight catalogue.

In 2000, McGuinness formed progressive trance trio Above & Beyond with Jono Grant and Paavo Siljamäki, also initiating his electronic dance music labels Anjunabeats and Anjunadeep.

In 2002, Sad Lovers & Giants released their sixth album, Melting in the Fullness of Time on Voight-Kampff Records, recorded predominantly by Allard and McGuinness with studio contributions from Sainsbury, Snake Corps bassist Liam McGuinness, drummer Kevin Mathews, and two members of Lovebabies, vocalist Jenny Clark and guitarist Bob Bradley. They played two dates in Italy a year later.

Another reformed line-up (Allard, McGuinness, Pollard, Gibson) played in Italy and Greece in April 2009, coinciding with Cherry Red's rereleases of Feeding the Flame and Epic Garden Music. Keyboardist Will Hicks joined later in 2009.

During 2010, the band played a handful of live dates in Athens and Barcelona (supported by the Snake Corps and the Essence, both previous Midnight bands), reissued The Mirror Test, and recorded a new 7-inch double A-side single, "Himalaya". They played at the Purple Turtle in Camden in December 2011, which was their first London gig since the early 1990s. In 2012, they played gigs in Berlin and Salerno and began writing and recording new material for a future album.

An extensive interview feature on SLAG appeared in the autumn 2013 and spring 2014 issues of music magazine The Big Takeover.

In 2014, frontman Allard published an autobiography of the band, Things We Never Did – The Story of Sad Lovers and Giants.

In March 2016, Sad Lovers & Giants embarked on a short tour of North America, performing mainly on the West Coast. They made their U.S. live debut at the South by Southwest festival in Austin, Texas.

The tour included gigs in Seattle (Chop Suey), Vancouver Canada (The Hindenburg), Portland (Black Water), Sacramento (The Colony), San Francisco (Elbow Room) Phoenix (Rip’s Bar), Los Angeles (Echoplex).

During the tour a well known LA radio host, Michael Stock (Part TIme Punks radio show KXLU) hosted the band for a session, recording four tracks including Alice Isn’t Playing, Beauty Is Truth, Biblical Crows and Like Thieves. This was released in September 2016 on the Voight Kampff label as a 12” single entitled Copacetic (The Part Time Punks Session).

In 2017, Cherry Red issued a five-disc retrospective box set, Where the Light Shines Through 1981-2017.

On 31 October 2018, the band released their seventh studio album and first in 16 years, Mission Creep.

== Discography ==
=== Albums ===
- Epic Garden Music (1982, Midnight Music) UK Indie No. 21
- Feeding the Flame (1983, Midnight Music)
- The Mirror Test (1987, Midnight Music)
- Headland (1990, Midnight Music)
- Treehouse Poetry (1991, Midnight Music)
- Melting in the Fullness of Time (2002, Voight-Kampff Records)
- Mission Creep (2018, Voight-Kampff Records)
- The Weight of Forgotten Dreams (2026, Voight-Kampff Records)

=== Singles and EPs ===
- Clé 7-inch EP (1981, Last Movement)
- Colourless Dream 7-inch single (1982, Last Movement)
- Lost in a Moment 7-inch single (1982, Midnight Music) UK Indie No. 48
- Man of Straw 7-inch/12-inch single (1983, Midnight Music) UK Indie No. 31
- Seven Kinds of Sin 12-inch single (1987, Midnight Music)
- White Russians 12-inch single (1987, Midnight Music)
- Cow Boys 12-inch EP (1988, Midnight Music)
- Sleep split 12-inch single with the Essence (1988, Midnight Music)
- Clocks Go Backwards 12-inch EP (1990, Midnight Music)
- Himalaya 7-inch single (2010, Voight-Kampff Records)
- Copacetic - The Part Time Punks Session 12-inch EP (2016, Voight-Kampff Records)
- Paradise (2018, Voight-Kampff Records)
- Asylum Town (2020, Voight-Kampff Records)

=== Live albums ===
- Total Sound (1986, Midnight Music)
- La Dolce Vita (Live in Lausanne) (1999, Voight-Kampff Records)

=== Compilation albums ===
- In the Breeze (1984, Midnight Music)
- Les Années Vertes (1988, Midnight Music)
- E-Mail From Eternity - The Best of Sad Lovers and Giants (1996, Anagram Records/Cherry Red Records)
- Headland & Treehouse Poetry (2001, Voight-Kampff Records)
- Lost in a Sea Full of Sighs (2016, Dark Entries Records)
- Where the Light Shines Through 1981-2017 box set (2017, Cherry Red Records)
