= John Williamson (musician) =

English bass guitarist (born 1963)

John Williamson (born 28 December 1963, in Ilford, Essex, England) was the bass guitarist in the indie pop group McCarthy between 1985 and 1990. Prior to this he was involved with McCarthy guitarist Tim Gane's industrial music imprint Black Dwarf releasing the now rare Trips on a Pleasure Beach under the name Jake Ray.
