= Colonial First State =

Australian wealth management group

- Formerly: First State Fund Management (1988–1994); State Bank (1994–1996); Colonial State Bank (1996–2000)
- Company type: Subsidiary
- Industry: Financial Services
- Founded: August 1988 (First State); 23 November 1994 (Bank); 23 September 1996 (CFS)
- Headquarters: Sydney, New South Wales, Australia
- Key people: Clive van Horen - CEO
- Products: Investment, Superannuation and Retirement
- AUM: AU$170 billion (September 2025)
- Parent: KKR (55%); Commonwealth Bank (45%)
- Website: www.cfs.com.au

Colonial First State (CFS) is an Australian wealth management group that provides investment, superannuation and retirement products to individuals as well as corporate and superannuation fund investors.

== History ==
The company was established in 1988 when the State Bank of New South Wales created First State Fund Management as a subsidiary. In 1994, Colonial Mutual acquired the State Bank of New South Wales from the NSW Government. On 23 September 1996, the merged entity was rebranded as Colonial State Bank, with First State Fund Management being branded as "Colonial First State" (CFS). CFS demutualised in 1997 and in 2000, it was acquired by the Commonwealth Bank, with the Colonial State Bank division being merged into the Commonwealth Bank.

In May 2020, owner Commonwealth Bank announced that, subject to gaining approval from the Australian Prudential Regulation Authority and Foreign Investment Review Board, it would sell a 55% interest in the business to KKR. The transaction was completed in November 2021. On 1 December 2021, CFS became a standalone company.

CFS announced its commitment on climate change, aligning itself with the goals of the Paris Agreement and committing to net zero emissions by 2050 and to a 30 per cent reduction in Greenhouse Gas emissions from 2019 levels for its investment portfolios.

== Controversies ==
In 2020, the Australian Securities and Investments Commission (ASIC) commenced legal proceedings against Commonwealth Bank and CFS in relation to alleged conflicted remuneration of $22 million paid by CFS to Commonwealth Bank for the distribution of a super product issued by CFS. In 2022, the Federal Court of Australia dismissed the case and in 2023 dismissed an appeal by ASIC.

In 2021, the Federal Court of Australia fined CFS $20 million for misleading superannuation members, resulting in CFS paying $67 million to remediate losses to 5,815 members. The court found that:

- CFS had told its members that legislative changes required CFS to contact them to obtain an investment direction to stay in the FirstChoice Fund when that was not the case
- CFS failed to tell members that if Colonial did not receive an investment direction from the member, it was required to transfer the member's superannuation contributions into a MySuper product.

In 2022, CFS settled a $56.3 million class action lawsuit with Maurice Blackburn for allegedly failing to transfer beneficiaries’ accrued default amounts to a MySuper as soon as reasonably practicable; however, the settlement came with no admission of liability or wrongdoing by CFS.

In 2023, CFS settled a $100 million class action lawsuit with Slater & Gordon for allegedly raising fees on superannuation members to fund ongoing commissions to financial advisers; however, the settlement came with no admission of liability or wrongdoing by CFS.
