= Malcolm Eden =

British musician (born 1963)

Malcolm Eden (born 1 September 1963, Ilford, Essex, England) is a singer, songwriter and guitarist, formerly of the indie pop group McCarthy between 1985 and 1990. Eden wrote the far left-leaning lyrics of the band.

Eden cited the election of Margaret Thatcher as prime minister in 1979, and his dislike of her, as the key event in starting his interest in Marxism. He explained the approach to songwriting in McCarthy: "Gary did the drums, although Tim and I used to give him suggestions. I put the lyrics on last. Some of the songs I wrote on my own, like ‘Frans Hals’", also saying, "almost all of the McCarthy songs are sung by a 'character', like a character in a play. I often don’t agree with the sentiments expressed in the song, quite the reverse".

He later formed the short-lived Herzfeld, who released an EP and a 10-inch album on the Duophonic label. In 2005, he contributed vocals to two tracks, "Where You Are", and "True Light", to That Summer's Clear album.

== Discography ==
=== With Herzfeld ===
- "Two Mothers"/"Who the Scroungers Are" 7" (1993) Duophonic
- The Sack 10" LP (1994) Duophonic
