= Tim Gane =

English musician (born 1964)

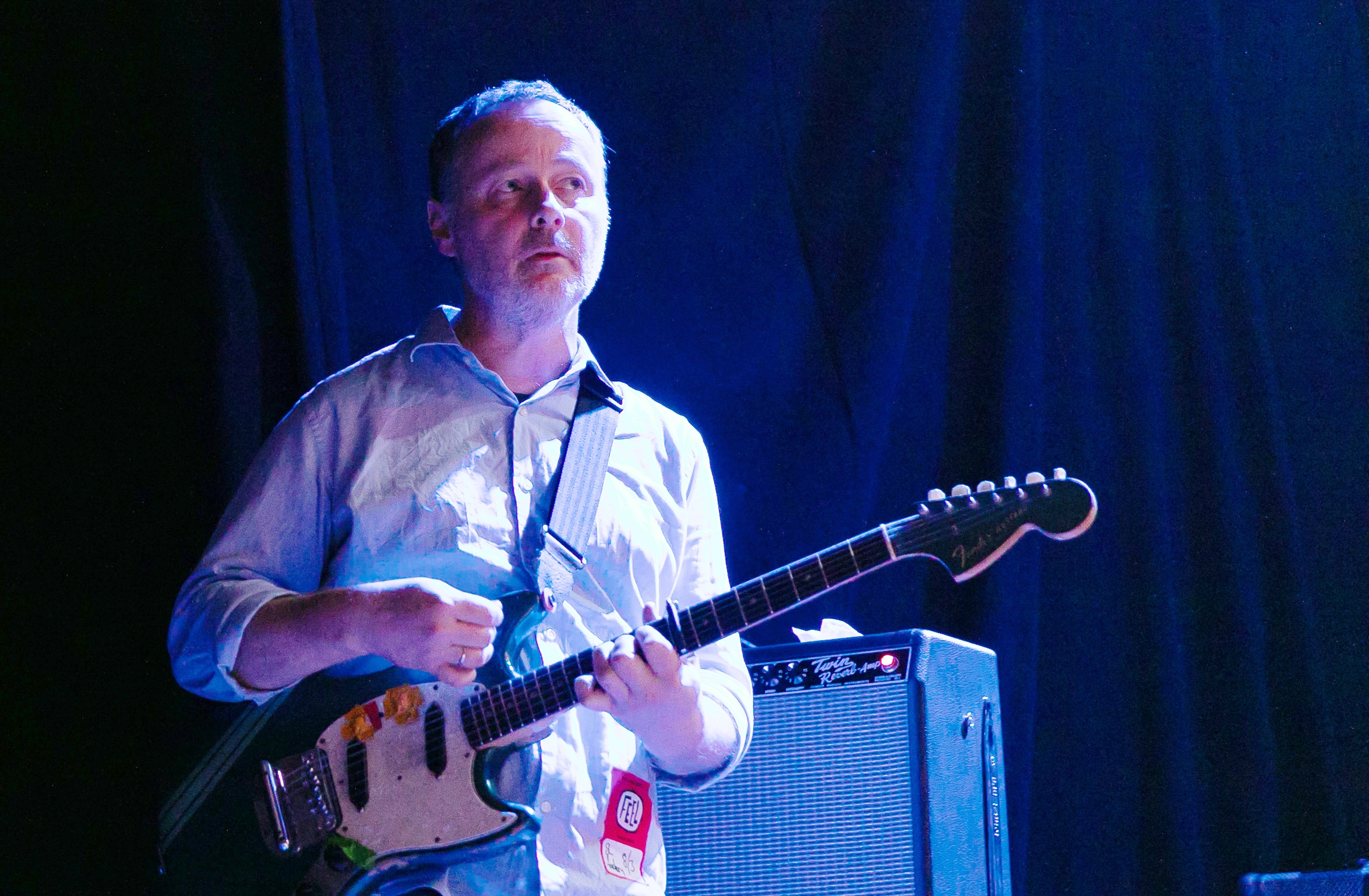
- Gane in 2020

Background information
- Born: Timothy John Gane; 12 July 1964 (age 61); Ilford, Essex, England
- Genres: Post-rock; avant-garde; indie pop
- Instruments: Guitar; synthesizers
- Years active: 1985–present

Timothy John Gane (born 12 July 1964) is an English songwriter and guitarist who co-founded Stereolab with his then-partner Lætitia Sadier.

== Biography ==
Gane was born in Ilford, Essex, and began his musical career experimenting with harsh noise in the early 1980s, under the alias Unkommunitim, releasing self-financed cassettes on Black Dwarf Wreckordings along with fellow Unkommuniti members Kallous Boys and other noise projects.

He was a key member of McCarthy from 1985 until their breakup in 1990.

=== Stereolab ===
Gane later formed Stereolab with Lætitia Sadier. For the first incarnation of the band, they enlisted ex-Chills bassist Martin Kean, drummer Joe Dilworth and Gina Morris on backing vocals. In 1993, the band were signed to the American major-label Elektra and were released from their recording contract in 2004. In 2009, Stereolab announced their hiatus. Stereolab reunited for a tour in 2019 to support a series of vinyl reissues.

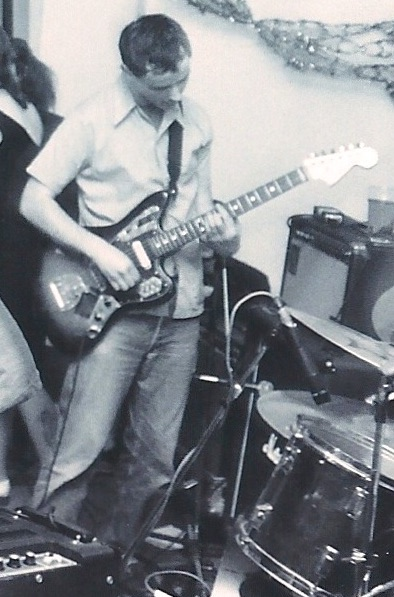
Gane performing with Stereolab in 1994

Turn On, Gane's side project with Sean O'Hagan, who Gane worked with in Stereolab, released their self-titled debut in 1997.

=== Cavern of Anti-Matter ===
In 2013, he released Blood-Drums under the moniker "Cavern of Anti-Matter", a band formed together with Holger Zapf and Dilworth. It was followed by the 2016 album Void Beats / Invocation Trex on Duophonic Records. It featured contributions by Bradford Cox and Peter Kember and Jan St. Werner. Live the band was reduced to a duo. In January 2017, Blood Drums was re-released through Duophonic.

In 2014, Gane compiled the tracks for Sky Records Kollektion 1, a collection of tracks from the German electronic-rock label, issued by Bureau B. In 2016, he presented FACT mix 544 for Fact Magazine.

Cavern of Anti-Matter provided the original soundtrack for the 2018 British horror comedy film In Fabric.

== Personal life ==
Gane and Lætitia Sadier were romantically involved throughout Stereolab's early years but separated in 2002. He lives in Berlin.
