= Mold and human health =

Harmful effects of molds

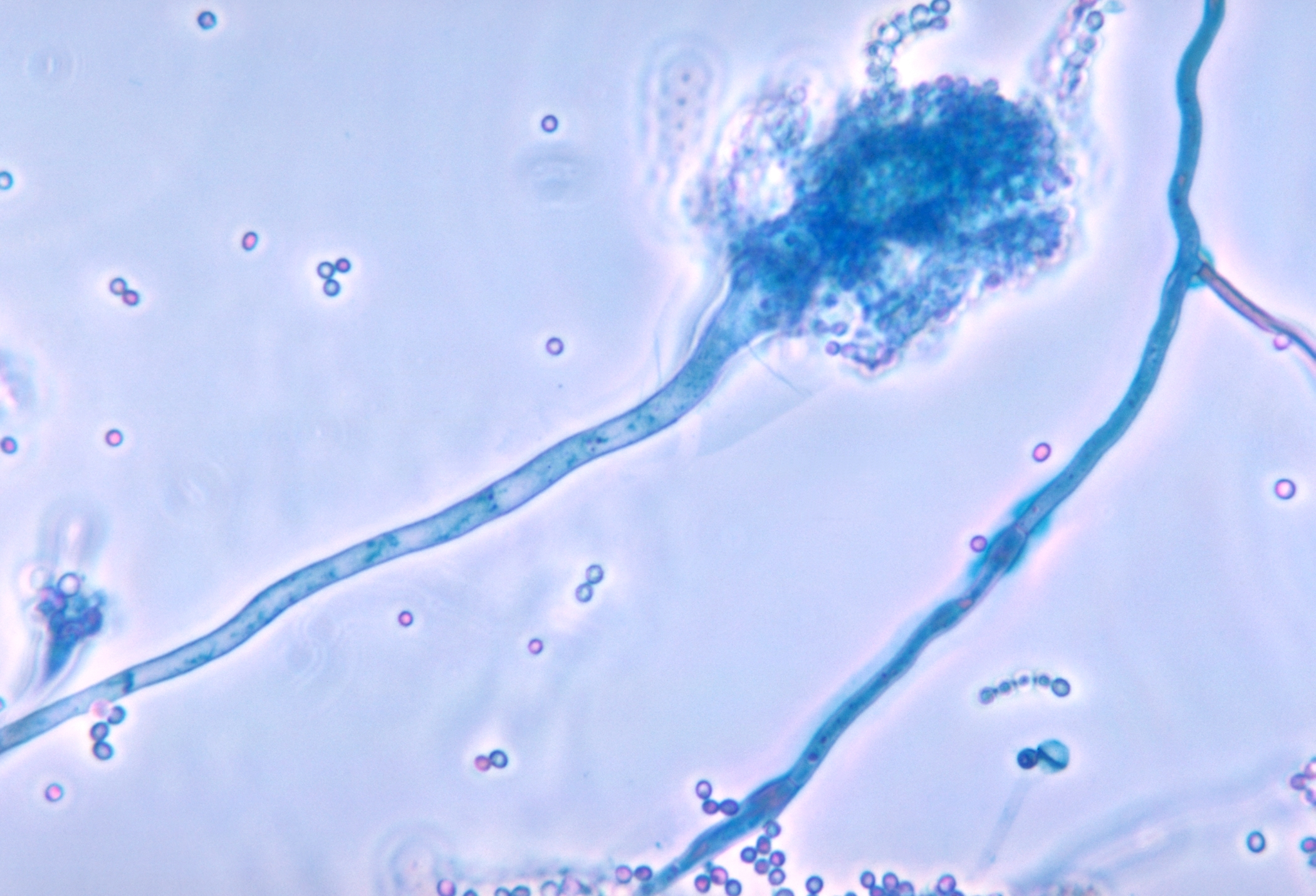
Light micrograph of the hyphae and spores of the human pathogen Aspergillus fumigatus

Mold health issues refer to the harmful health effects of molds (moulds in British English) and their mycotoxins.

Molds are ubiquitous in the biosphere, and mold spores are a common component of household and workplace dust. The vast majority of molds are not hazardous to humans, and reaction to molds can vary between individuals, with relatively minor allergic reactions being the most common. The United States Centers for Disease Control and Prevention (CDC) reported in its June 2006 report 'Mold Prevention Strategies and Possible Health Effects in the Aftermath of Hurricanes and Major Floods' that "excessive exposure to mold-contaminated materials can cause adverse health effects in susceptible persons regardless of the type of mold or the extent of contamination." When mold spores are present in abnormally high quantities, they can present especially hazardous health risks to humans after prolonged exposure, including allergic reactions or poisoning by mycotoxins, or causing fungal infection (mycosis).

== Health effects ==
People who are atopic (sensitive), already have allergies, asthma, or compromised immune systems and occupy damp or moldy buildings are at an increased risk of health problems such as inflammatory responses to mold spores, metabolites such as mycotoxins, and other components. Other problems are respiratory and/or immune system responses including respiratory symptoms, respiratory infections, exacerbation of asthma, and rarely hypersensitivity pneumonitis, allergic alveolitis, chronic rhinosinusitis and allergic fungal sinusitis. A person's reaction to mold depends on their sensitivity and other health conditions, the amount of mold present, length of exposure, and the type of mold or mold products.

The five most common genera of indoor molds are Cladosporium, Penicillium, Aspergillus, Alternaria, and Trichoderma.

Damp environments that allow mold to grow can also allow the proliferation of bacteria and release volatile organic compounds.

=== Symptoms of mold exposure ===
Symptoms of mold exposure can include:

- Nasal and sinus congestion, runny nose
- Respiratory problems, such as wheezing and difficulty breathing, chest tightness
- Cough
- Throat irritation
- Sneezing

==== Health effects linking to asthma ====
Adverse respiratory health effects are associated with occupancy in buildings with moisture and mold damage. Infants in homes with mold have a much greater risk of developing asthma and allergic rhinitis. Infants may develop respiratory symptoms due to exposure to a specific type of fungal mold, called Penicillium. Signs that an infant may have mold-related respiratory problems include (but are not limited to) a persistent cough and wheeze. Increased exposure increases the probability of developing respiratory symptoms during their first year of life. As many as 21% of asthma cases may result from exposure to mold.

Mold exposures have a variety of health effects depending on the person. Some people are more sensitive to mold than others. Exposure to mold can cause several health issues such as; throat irritation, nasal stuffiness, eye irritation, cough, and wheezing, as well as skin irritation in some cases. Exposure to mold may also cause heightened sensitivity depending on the time and nature of exposure. People at higher risk for mold allergies are people with chronic lung illnesses and weak immune systems, which can often result in more severe reactions when exposed to mold.

There has been sufficient evidence that damp indoor environments are correlated with upper respiratory tract symptoms such as coughing, and wheezing in people with asthma.

=== Flood-specific mold health effects ===
Among children and adolescents, the most common health effect post-flooding was lower respiratory tract symptoms, though there was a lack of association with measurements of total fungi. Another study found that these respiratory symptoms were positively associated with exposure to water damaged homes, exposure included being inside without participating in clean up. Despite lower respiratory effects among all children, there was a significant difference in health outcomes between children with pre-existing conditions and children without. Children with pre-existing conditions were at greater risk that can likely be attributed to the greater disruption of care in the face of flooding and natural disaster.

Although mold is the primary focus post flooding for residents, the effects of dampness alone must also be considered. According to the American Institute of Medicine, there is a significant association between dampness in the home and wheeze, cough, and upper respiratory symptoms. A later analysis determined that 30% to 50% of asthma-related health outcomes are associated with not only mold, but also dampness in buildings.

While there is a proven correlation between mold exposure and the development of upper and lower respiratory syndromes, there are still fewer incidences of negative health effects than one might expect. Barbeau and colleagues suggested that studies do not show a greater impact from mold exposure for several reasons: 1) the types of health effects are not severe and are therefore not caught; 2) people whose homes have flooded find alternative housing to prevent exposure; 3) self-selection, the healthier people participated in mold clean-up and were less likely to get sick; 4) exposures were time-limited as result of remediation efforts and; 5) the lack of access to health care post-flooding may result in fewer illnesses being discovered and reported for their association with mold. There are also certain notable scientific limitations in studying the exposure effects of dampness and molds on individuals because there are currently no known biomarkers that can prove that a person was exclusively exposed to molds. Thus, it is currently impossible to prove correlation between mold exposure and symptoms.

== Mold-associated conditions ==
Health problems associated with high levels of airborne mold spores include allergic reactions, asthma episodes, irritations of the eye, nose and throat, sinus congestion, and other respiratory problems. Several studies and reviews have suggested that childhood exposure to dampness and mold might contribute to the development of asthma. For example, residents of homes with mold are at an elevated risk for both respiratory infections and bronchitis. When mold spores are inhaled by an immunocompromised individual, some mold spores may begin to grow on living tissue, attaching to cells along the respiratory tract and causing further problems. Generally, when this occurs, the illness is an epiphenomenon and not the primary pathology. Also, mold may produce mycotoxins, either before or after exposure to humans, potentially causing toxicity.

=== Fungal infection ===
A serious health threat from mold exposure for immunocompromised individuals is systemic fungal infection (systemic mycosis). Immunocompromised individuals exposed to high levels of mold, or individuals with chronic exposure may become infected. Sinuses and digestive tract infections are most common; lung and skin infections are also possible. Mycotoxins may or may not be produced by the invading mold.

Dermatophytes are the parasitic fungi that cause skin infections such as athlete's foot and tinea cruris. Most dermatophyte fungi take the form of mold, as opposed to a yeast, with an appearance (when cultured) that is similar to other molds.

Opportunistic infection by molds such as Talaromyces marneffei and Aspergillus fumigatus is a common cause of illness and death among immunocompromised people, including people with AIDS or asthma.

=== Mold-induced hypersensitivity ===
The most common form of hypersensitivity is caused by the direct exposure to inhaled mold spores that can be dead or alive or hyphal fragments which can lead to allergic asthma or allergic rhinitis. The most common effects are rhinorrhea (runny nose), watery eyes, coughing and asthma attacks. Another form of hypersensitivity is hypersensitivity pneumonitis. Exposure can occur at home, at work or in other settings. It is predicted that about 5% of people have some airway symptoms due to allergic reactions to molds in their lifetimes.

Hypersensitivity may also be a reaction toward an established fungal infection in allergic bronchopulmonary aspergillosis.

=== Mycotoxin toxicity ===
Molds excrete toxic compounds called mycotoxins, secondary metabolites produced by fungi under certain environmental conditions. These environmental conditions affect the production of mycotoxins at the transcription level. Temperature, water activity and pH, strongly influence mycotoxin biosynthesis by increasing the level of transcription within the fungal spore. It has also been found that low levels of fungicides can boost mycotoxin synthesis. Mycotoxins can be harmful or lethal to humans and animals when exposure is high enough.

Extreme exposure to very high levels of mycotoxins can lead to neurological problems and, in some cases, death; fortunately, such exposures rarely to never occur in normal exposure scenarios, even in residences with serious mold problems. Prolonged exposure, such as daily workplace exposure, can be particularly harmful.

It is thought that all molds may produce mycotoxins, and thus all molds may be potentially toxic if large enough quantities are ingested, or the human becomes exposed to extreme quantities of mold. Mycotoxins are not produced all the time, but only under specific growing conditions. Mycotoxins are harmful or lethal to humans and animals.

Mycotoxins can be found on the mold spore and mold fragments, and therefore they can also be found on the substrate upon which the mold grows. Routes of entry for these insults can include ingestion, dermal exposure, and inhalation.

Aflatoxin is an example of a mycotoxin. It is a cancer-causing poison produced by certain fungi in or on foods and feeds, especially in field corn and peanuts.

== Exposure sources and prevention ==
The primary sources of mold exposure are from the indoor air in buildings with substantial mold growth and the ingestion of food with mold growths.

=== Air ===
While mold and related microbial agents can be found both inside and outside, specific factors can lead to significantly higher levels of these microbes, creating a potential health hazard. Several notable factors are water damage in buildings, the use of building materials which provide a suitable substrate and source of food to amplify mold growth, relative humidity, and energy-efficient building designs, which can prevent proper circulation of outside air and create a unique ecology in the built environment. A common reason for mold hazards in the household can be the placement of furniture, which may result in a lack of ventilation of the nearby wall. The simplest method of avoiding mold in a home so affected is to move the furniture in question.

More than half of adult workers in moldy/humid buildings suffer from nasal or sinus symptoms due to mold exposure.

Prevention of mold exposure and its ensuing health issues begins with the prevention of mold growth in the first place by avoiding a mold-supporting environment. Extensive flooding and water damage can support extensive mold growth. Following hurricanes, homes with greater flood damage, especially those with more than 3 feet (0.91 m) of indoor flooding, demonstrated far higher levels of mold growth compared with homes with little or no flooding.

It is useful to perform an assessment of the location and extent of the mold hazard in a structure. Various practices of remediation can be followed to mitigate mold issues in buildings, the most important of which is to reduce moisture levels. Removal of affected materials after the source of moisture has been reduced and/or eliminated may be necessary, as some materials cannot be remediated. Thus, the concept of mold growth, assessment, and remediation is essential in preventing health issues arising due to the presence of dampness and mold.

Molds may excrete liquids or low-volatility gases, but the concentrations are so low that frequently they cannot be detected even with sensitive analytical sampling techniques. Sometimes, these by-products are detectable by odor, in which case they are referred to as "ergonomic odors", meaning the odors are noticeable but do not indicate toxicologically significant exposures.

=== Food ===
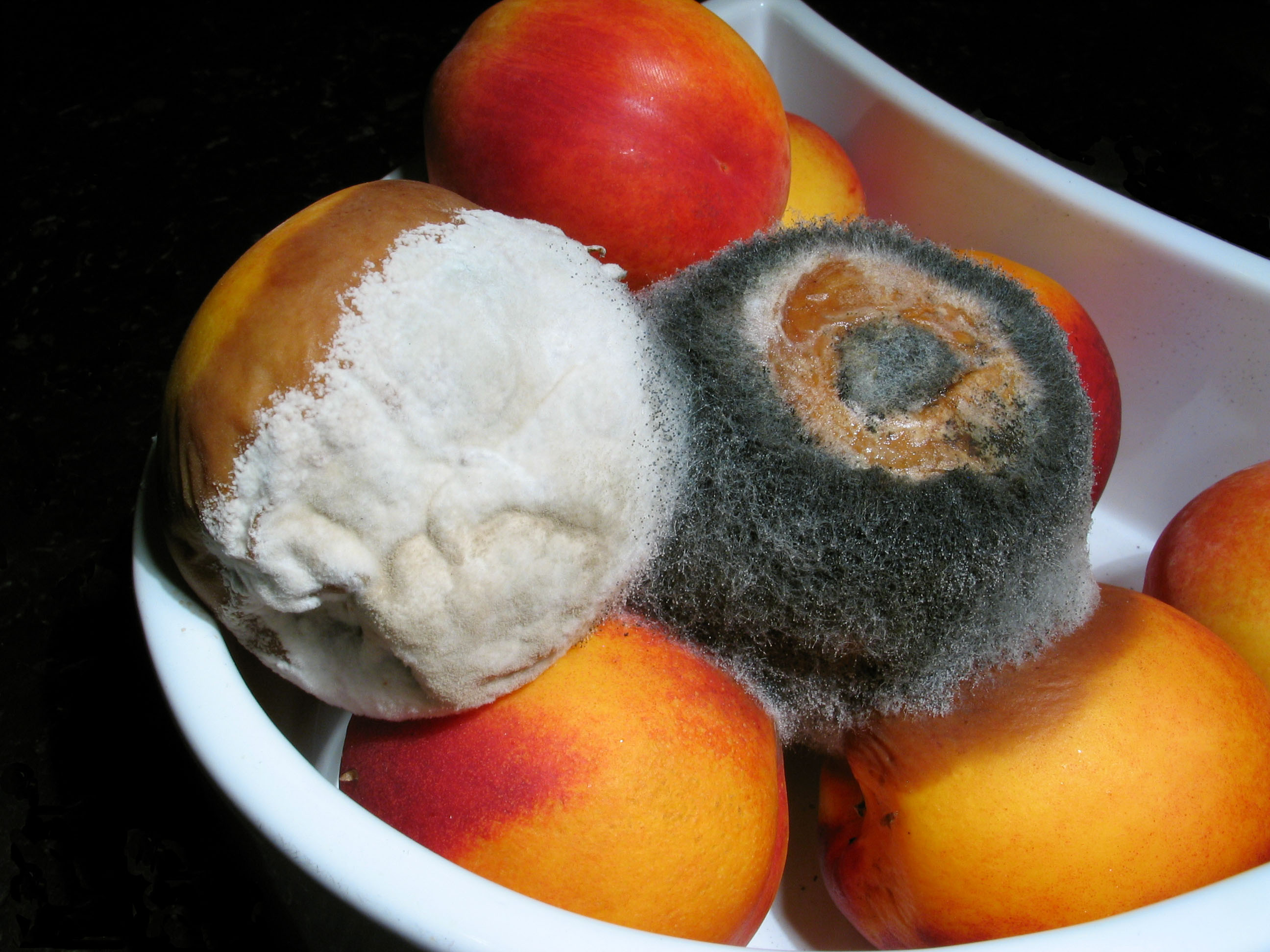
Moldy nectarines that were in a refrigerator. The nectarine with black mold is also affecting the nectarine underneath.

Molds that are often found on meat and poultry include members of the genera Alternaria, Aspergillus, Botrytis, Cladosporium, Fusarium, Geotrichum, Mortierella, Mucor, Neurospora, Paecilomyces, Penicillium, and Rhizopus. Grain crops in particular incur considerable losses both in field and storage due to pathogens, post-harvest spoilage, and insect damage. A number of common microfungi are important agents of post-harvest spoilage, notably members of the genera Aspergillus, Fusarium, and Penicillium. A number of these produce mycotoxins (soluble, non-volatile toxins produced by a range of microfungi that demonstrate specific and potent toxic properties on human and animal cells) that can render foods unfit for consumption. When ingested, inhaled, or absorbed through skin, mycotoxins may cause or contribute to a range of effects from reduced appetite and general malaise to acute illness or death in rare cases. Mycotoxins may also contribute to cancer. Dietary exposure to the mycotoxin aflatoxin B1, commonly produced by growth of the fungus Aspergillus flavus on improperly stored ground nuts in many areas of the developing world, is known to independently (and synergistically with Hepatitis B virus) induce liver cancer. Mycotoxin-contaminated grain and other food products have a significant impact on human and animal health globally. According to the World Health Organization, roughly 25% of the world's food may be contaminated by mycotoxins.

Prevention of mold exposure from food is generally to consume food that has no mold growths on it. Also, mold growth in the first place can be prevented by the same concept of mold growth, assessment, and remediation that prevents air exposure. Also, it is especially useful to clean the inside of the refrigerator and to ensure dishcloths, towels, sponges, and mops are clean.

Ruminants are considered to have increased resistance to some mycotoxins, presumably due to the superior mycotoxin-degrading capabilities of their gut microbiota. The passage of mycotoxins through the food chain may also have important consequences on human health. For example, in China in December 2011, high levels of carcinogen aflatoxin M1 in Mengniu brand milk were found to be associated with the consumption of mold-contaminated feed by dairy cattle.

=== Bedding ===
Bacteria, fungi, allergens, and particle-bound semi-volatile organic compounds (SVOCs) can all be found in bedding and pillows with possible consequences for human health given the high amount of exposure each day. Over 47 species of fungi have been identified in pillows, although the typical range of species found in a single pillow varied between four and sixteen. Compared to feather pillows, synthetic pillows typically display a slightly greater variety of fungal species and significantly higher levels of β‐(1,3)‐glucan, which can cause inflammatory responses. The authors concluded that these and related results suggest feather bedding might be a more appropriate choice for asthmatics than synthetics. Some newer bedding products incorporate silver nanoparticles due to their antibacterial, antifungal, and antiviral properties; however, the long-term safety of this additional exposure to these nanoparticles is relatively unknown, and a conservative approach to the use of these products is recommended.

=== Flooding ===
Flooding in houses causes a unique opportunity for mold growth, which may be attributed to adverse health effects in people exposed to the mold, especially children and adolescents. In a study on the health effects of mold exposure after hurricanes Katrina and Rita, the predominant types of mold were Aspergillus, Penicillium, and Cladosporium with indoor spore counts ranging from 6,142 – 735,123 spores m^{−3}. Molds isolated following flooding were different from mold previously reported for non-water damaged homes in the area. Further research found that homes with greater than three feet of indoor flooding demonstrated significantly higher levels of mold than those with little or no flooding.

==== Mitigation ====
Recommended strategies to prevent mold include avoiding mold-contamination; utilization of environmental controls; the use of personal protective equipment (PPE), including skin, eye, and respiratory protection; and environmental controls such as ventilation and suppression of dust. When mold cannot be prevented, the CDC recommends clean-up protocol including first taking emergency action to stop water intrusion. Second, they recommend determining the extent of water damage and mold contamination. And third, they recommend planning remediation activities such as establishing containment and protection for workers and occupants; eliminating water or moisture sources if possible; decontaminating or removing damaged materials and drying any wet materials; evaluating whether space has been successfully remediated; and reassembling the space to control sources of moisture.

== History ==
In 1698, the physician Sir John Floyer published the first edition of A Treatise of the Asthma, the first English textbook on the malady. In it, he describes how dampness and mold could trigger an asthmatic attack, specifically, "damp houses and fenny [boggy] countries". He also writes of an asthmatic "who fell into a violent fit by going into a Wine-Cellar", presumably due to the "fumes" in the air.

In the 1930s, mold was identified as the cause behind the mysterious deaths of farm animals in Russia and other countries. Stachybotrys chartarum was found growing on the wet grain used for animal feed. Illness and death also occurred in humans when starving peasants ate large quantities of rotten food grains and cereals heavily overgrown with the Stachybotrys mold.

In the 1970s, building construction techniques changed in response to changing economic realities, including the energy crisis. As a result, homes, and buildings became more airtight. Also, cheaper materials such as drywall came into common use. The newer building materials reduced the drying potential of the structures, making moisture problems more prevalent. This combination of increased moisture and suitable substrates contributed to increased mold growth inside buildings.

In November 2022, a UK coroner recorded that a two-year-old child, Awaab Ishak from Rochdale, England, died in 2020 of "acute airway oedema with severe granulomatous tracheobronchitis due to environmental mould exposure" in his home. While not specified in the coroner's report or outputs from official proceedings, the death was widely reported as due to specifically 'toxic' or 'toxic black' mold. The finding led to a 2023 change in UK law, known as Awaab's Law, which will require social housing providers to remedy reported damp and mould within certain time limits.

== See also ==
- Environmental engineering
- Environmental health
- Occupational asthma
- Occupational safety and health
