= College Bank =

Tower blocks in Rochdale, Greater Manchester, England

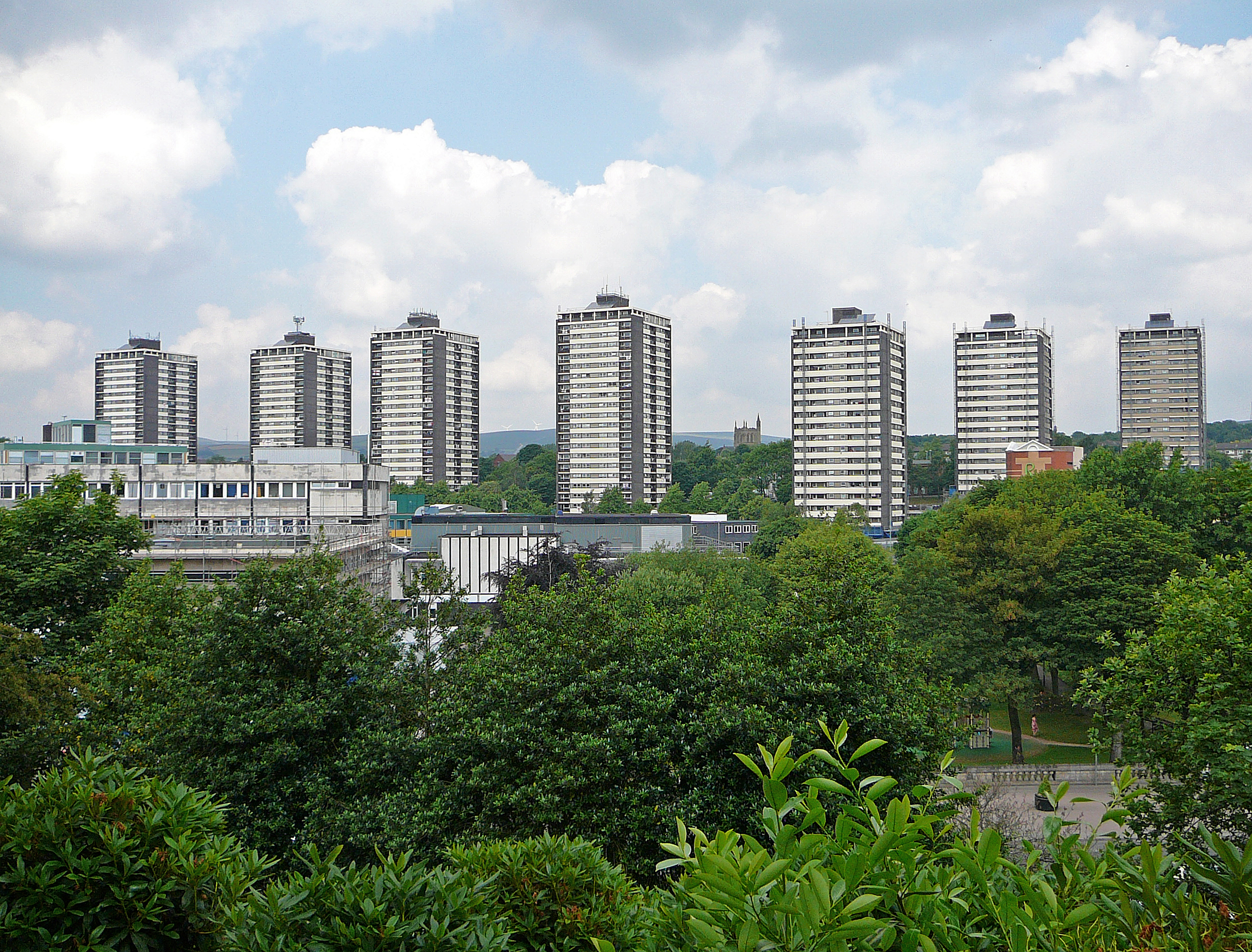
- The Seven Sisters (College Bank) in 2010

- Location within Greater Manchester
- Alternative names: Seven Sisters

General information
- Status: Proposed for demolition
- Type: Residential towers
- Location: College Bank Way, Rochdale, Greater Manchester, England
- Coordinates: 53.6174°N 2.1649°W
- Year built: 1960s
- Opened: 1966; 60 years ago
- Cost: £2.5–3.5 million
- Owner: Rochdale Boroughwide Housing

Height
- Height: 64 m (210 ft) (tallest)

Technical details
- Material: Reinforced concrete
- Floor count: 21 (tallest)

Design and construction
- Architects: W. H. G. Mercer and E. V. Collins
- Architecture firm: George Wimpey & Co.

Website
- Official website

College Bank, known locally as the Seven Sisters, is a group of seven residential tower blocks on College Bank Way in Rochdale, Greater Manchester, England. Built in the 1960s, the towers are a prominent feature of the town's skyline and an example of post-war urban regeneration. Since 2017, the future of the estate has been the subject of debate, with proposals for demolition opposed by residents and campaigners. Following safety concerns and the rehousing of residents from 2025, Rochdale Boroughwide Housing (RBH) announced in November 2026 that all seven towers would be demolished and replaced with 601 new homes, although no date for demolition had been announced.

== History ==
=== Planning ===
In 1961 Rochdale Corporation initiated a major housing redevelopment project for the town, which involved the clearance of a former slum area. College Bank was subsequently designed by borough surveyor W. H. G. Mercer and architect E. V. Collins of George Wimpey & Co. The original plans included four tower blocks ranging from 20 to 21 storeys and three blocks between 16 and 17 storeys in height.

=== Construction and occupation ===
Construction began in the early 1960s, with the estate officially opening in 1966. The development was part of a broader effort to replace slum housing in the area known as "The Paddock" and provide modern homes for working-class families. The estate comprises 761 flats across seven towers: Dunkirk Rise, Holland Rise, Mardyke, Mitchell Hey, Tentercroft, Town Mill Brow, and Underwood. The blocks were named after the streets they replaced, including Dunkirk, Mardyke, Tentercroft, and Town Mill Brow.

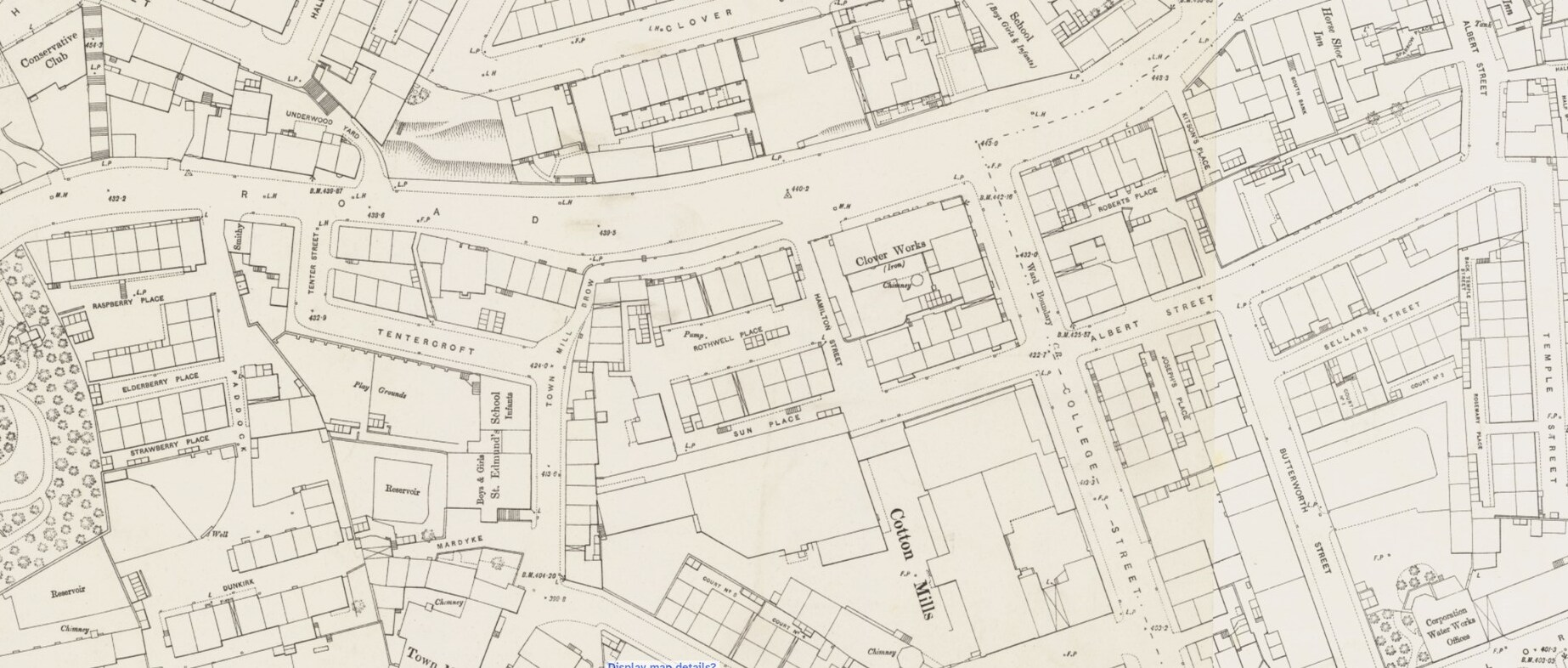
1840 street plan of the area of Rochdale town centre, later replaced by the College Bank flats

In October 1966, The Guardian described College Bank as a "housing experiment in a town's centre," highlighting its role in urban renewal. The total cost of the development was approximately £2.5–3.5 million. Although the blocks attracted families from across the North West, they were not primarily intended to address Rochdale's council housing waiting list, which stood at around 2,000 applicants at the time. Due to relatively high rents—reportedly up to twice the cost of standard council housing—the flats were unaffordable for many on the list. Instead, the development aimed to attract professional residents to the town centre and was largely funded through government subsidies.

=== Mid‑1990s to late 2000s ===
During the mid-1990s, while still under the ownership of Rochdale Borough Council, the seven blocks underwent an exterior renovation. The work, carried out by Laing Construction, included installing double glazed windows and doors and new balconies. The outer walls were coated in a buff-coloured render with matching coping stones along the edge of balconies, giving the structures their current look.

In the late 2000s, solar panels were added to the rooftops to power communal lighting and improve energy efficiency in the ageing buildings.

=== 2017–2022 ===
In 2017 Rochdale Boroughwide Housing (RBH) announced plans to demolish four of the towers—Dunkirk Rise, Mitchell Hey, Tentercroft, and Town Mill Brow—and replace them with low-rise housing. This sparked significant opposition from residents and led to the formation of the Save the Seven Sisters campaign group. Hundreds of tenants relocated from the estate following the announcement.

In 2022 RBH was placed under special measures following the death of two-year-old Awaab Ishak, who died as a result of prolonged exposure to black mould in his family's flat, located approximately one mile from the College Bank estate. A coroner concluded that the mould was the direct cause of the child's death. As a consequence of the regulatory downgrade, RBH has reportedly been unable to secure investment for repairs to College Bank, despite the appointment of a new leadership team the following year.

=== 2023–present ===
Although demolition plans were shelved in 2023, RBH reignited concerns in late 2024 by stating that "all options were back on the table" following the collapse of a refurbishment partnership with Legal & General Affordable Homes. The estimated cost of refurbishment had exceeded £107 million, prompting RBH to explore alternative redevelopment strategies.

On 22 October 2025, RBH informed residents of College Bank that all seven tower blocks must be vacated in the coming months due to serious building safety concerns. This decision followed detailed independent surveys which revealed structural issues that compromised the long-term safety of the buildings, regardless of whether refurbishment or demolition is pursued.

The surveys identified a range of structural and infrastructure issues including defects in the buildings' concrete frames, electrical system faults, roof deterioration, and failures in the water pumping mechanisms. Additionally, residents faced high energy costs due to inefficiencies in heating and lighting.

The surveys confirmed that residents will need to relocate temporarily or permanently, depending on the final regeneration plan. A decision on the future of the site was expected by the end of 2025, with input from the College Bank Task Force. In response to the surveys, members of the campaign to Save the Seven Sisters opposed the move, arguing it implied a pre-determined decision to demolish the estate and vowed to resist relocation.

On 6 March 2026, the remaining residents of the Mitchell Hey block were evacuated after a water main burst. The following month RBH announced that it had decided not to reopen the building. It also stated that no decision had yet been made regarding the possible demolition of the tower blocks.

In November 2026, RBH announced plans to demolish the tower blocks and replace them with 601 new homes, stating that redevelopment was a more viable option than refurbishment; no date for demolition had been announced.

== Architecture ==
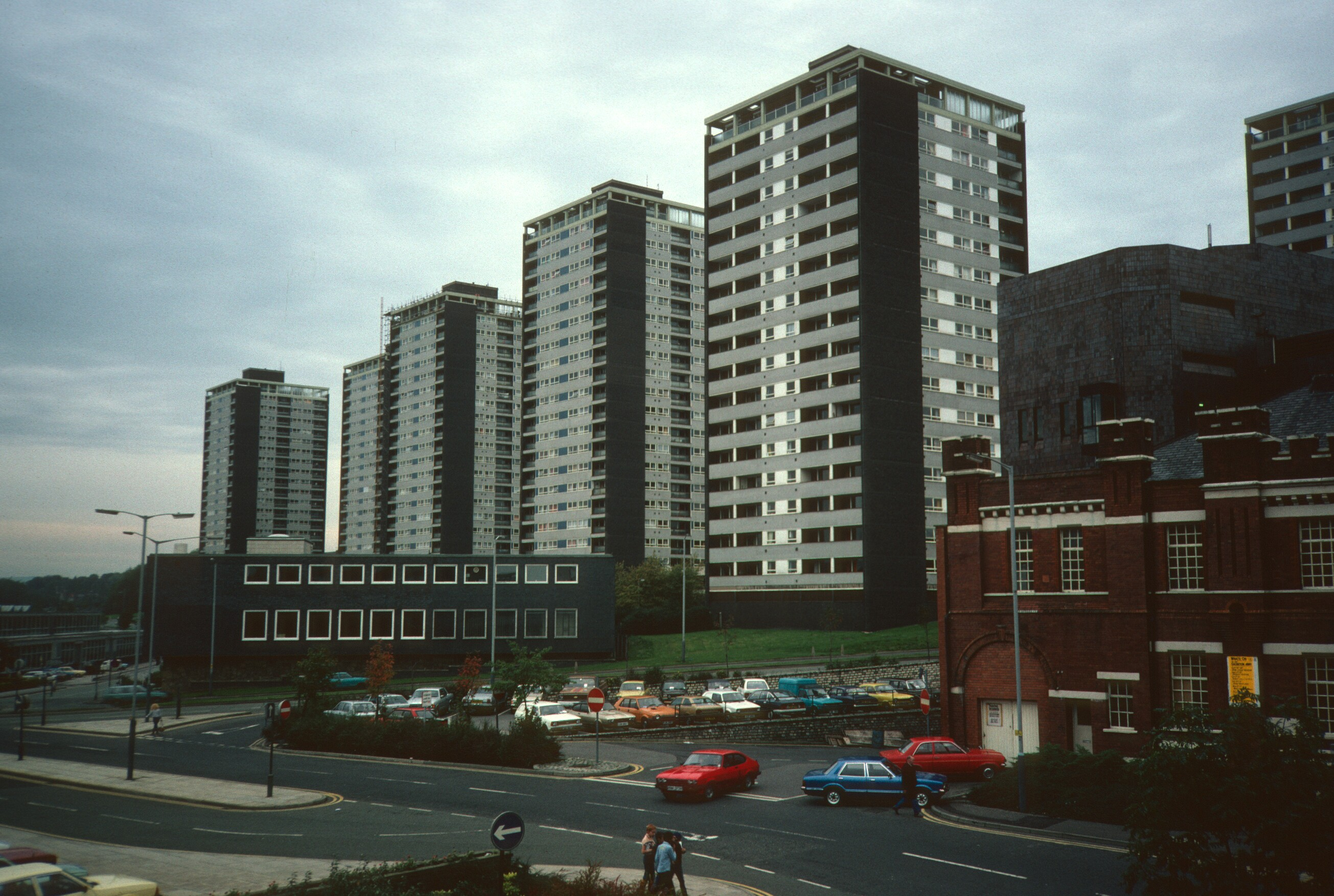
Dunkirk Rise, Mitchell Hey, Tentercroft, and Town Mill Brow

The towers were built using reinforced concrete, typical of mid-20th-century high-rise construction. In the taller blocks, each floor was designed to accommodate four two-bedroom flats and two bedsit units intended for single occupancy. The smaller blocks feature a layout of four one-bedroom flats and two bedsits per floor.

Each building originally featured a rooftop common room intended for tenant meetings and social events, as well as amenities such as underfloor heating.

Four of the towers—Dunkirk Rise, Mitchell Hey, Tentercroft, and Town Mill Brow—are the joint-tallest buildings in Rochdale, each standing at 64 metres (210 ft) in height.

== Location ==
The estate occupies a prominent location near the town centre and is bordered by several key roads. St Mary's Gate (A58) runs near the southern edge of the estate, while Spotland Road (A680) forms part of the northern boundary. Within the estate, College Bank Way provides internal access via Holland Street, and College Road links the area to surrounding neighbourhoods.

== See also ==
- List of tallest buildings and structures in Greater Manchester
