= Rochdale Boroughwide Housing =

Social housing provider in Rochdale, England

- Abbreviation: RBH
- Formation: 2012
- Purpose: Social housing in England
- Location: Rochdale
- Chief Executive: position vacant
- Website: rbh.org.uk

Rochdale Boroughwide Housing (RBH) is a social housing provider in Greater Manchester, England. It was established in 2012 to receive the transfer of housing stock from Rochdale Borough Council. It owns and manages about 12,700 properties. In March 2020, it employed 545 full time equivalent staff.

== Structure ==
As a mutual society, RBH is governed by two structures: a board of directors, and a body of elected representatives made up of tenant and employee members, with additional seats for members Rochdale Borough Council.

Its subsidiaries include RBH (Design and Build) Limited, RBH Professional Limited. Its charitable development subsidiary, Brighter Horizons, was closed in 2013 when RBH became a friendly society.

== History ==
In 2009 Brighter Horizons was allocated £300,000 from the Homes and Communities Agency to purchase five former local authority houses which it then brought up to Decent Homes Standard.

On 26 March 2012, Rochdale Council transferred 13,712 properties to RBH. These had previously managed by an arms-length management organisation (ALMO) on behalf of the Council. On 26 June 2013, RBH became a mutual housing society.

In 2017, the In-Depth Assessment carried out by the Homes and Communities Agency upgraded it to the highest governance rating and it remained on the second-highest viability rating.

In 2019, the top five executives were to receive a collective salary increase of £158,000 over the next three years, to be funded through 'efficiency savings'. There were complaints from councillors, but they had no power to intervene.

== Activity ==
It plans to build 496 housing units between 2021 and 2026. They will be allocated between social or affordable rent, supported housing, shared ownership and rent to buy. RBH plans to demolish some blocks of flats in the town and replace them with new housing of various types.

It launched its own BAME employee network group for the 2021 National Inclusion Week.

== Death of Awaab Ishak ==
In December 2020 Awaab Ishak, a two year-old child, died in a flat owned by the company. In 2022, following legal action by the family, a coroner ruled that the respiratory condition that caused the child's death was caused by prolonged exposure to toxic black mould in the flat.

His father had complained to RBH about the mould in 2017 and was told to paint over it. Following the coroner's verdict, RBH's chief executive Gareth Swarbrick said that he was "truly devastated about Awaab's death and the things we got wrong. We didn't recognise the level of risk to a little boy's health from the mould in the family's home. We allowed a legal disrepair process, widely used in the housing sector, to get in the way of promptly tackling the mould."

Chris Clarkson, the local MP, called the company "modern day slum lords". He said he had been sent photographs from a RBH-owned house in Middleton "caked in black mould and rising damp", showing that the conditions seen in Ishak's home were "not an isolated incident".

The Housing Ombudsman, Richard Blakeway, is exercising his powers to carry out a further investigation to see if this complaint is indicative of wider failure within RBH.

On 19 November 2022, the board of RBH sacked Swarbrick over the failure to protect Ishak.
