= Rochdale Riverside =

Coordinates: 53.6178°N 2.1544°W

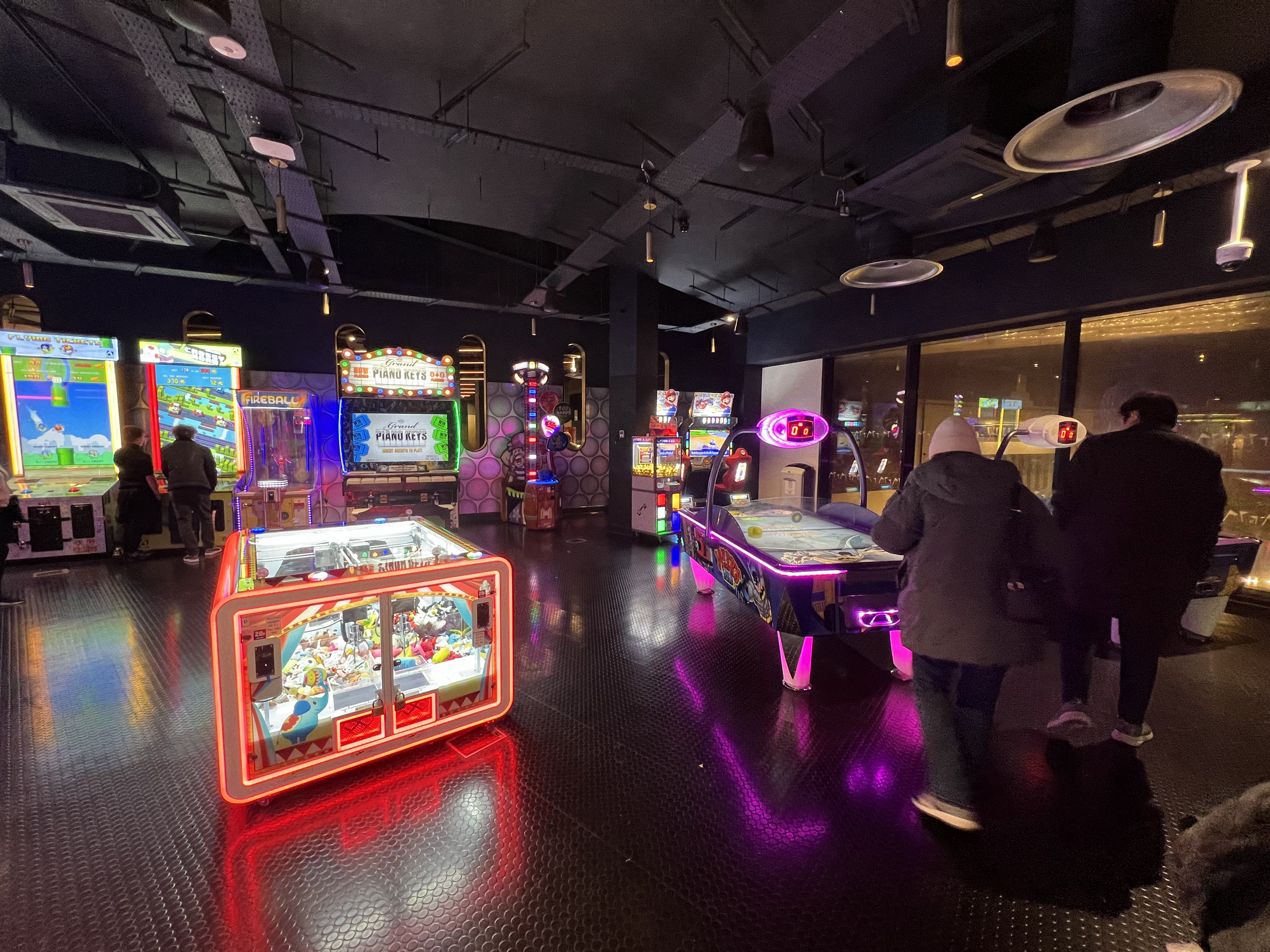
The arcade at Rochdale Riverside

Rochdale Riverside is a retail and leisure complex in the town of Rochdale, England. The first phase of the development was completed in April 2020, during the onset of the COVID-19 pandemic. The development covers 200,000 square feet (18,600 square metres) of floor space, including a 50,000 square-foot Marks & Spencer and a six-screen Reel cinema. There is also a 520-unit car park. The scheme cost £80 million. The complex also includes an arcade and a mini golf course.

The development sits opposite Number One Riverside, a multi-use public building that opened in 2013 which houses council offices for Rochdale, its central library, and its public information hub.

== See also ==
- Number One Riverside
