= Homelessness Act 2002 =

Act of the Parliament of the United Kingdom

Homelessness Act 2002 (Note: Section 21(1).)
- Act of Parliament
- Parliament of the United Kingdom
- Long title: An Act to make further provision about the functions of local housing authorities relating to homelessness and the allocation of housing accommodation; and for connected purposes.
- Citation: 2002 c. 7
- Territorial extent: England and Wales; Isles of Scilly; (Note: Section 21(2)–(3).)

Dates
- Royal assent: 26 February 2002
- Commencement: Various (Note: Section 20.)
Other legislation
Amends	Housing Act 1985; Housing Act 1996; Immigration and Asylum Act 1999
Amended by	Localism Act 2011; Housing (Wales) Act 2014; Renters' Rights Act 2025

Status: Amended

Text of statute as originally enacted

Revised text of statute as amended

The Homelessness Act 2002 (c. 7) is an act of the Parliament of the United Kingdom.

== Provisions ==
The act requires a multi-agency approach to the prevention of homelessness.

The act amended the Housing Act 1996 and sets out the duties owed by local housing authorities to someone who is homeless or threatened with homelessness.

The act requires local authorities to expand their categories of homeless groups in priority need of housing to include:

- 16 and 17-year-olds
- Young people leaving care
- People forced to flee their home because of domestic, racial and other forms of violence
- Individuals leaving institutions

Local authorities are required to publish strategies with the goal of reducing homelessness.

== Reception ==
The legislation was supported by Shelter.
