= Housing Ombudsman =

UK public body

Housing Ombudsman Service
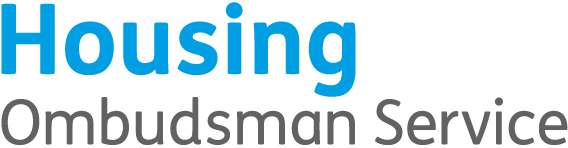

Organisation overview
- Formed: 1996; 30 years ago
- Type: Non-departmental public body
- Jurisdiction: England
- Headquarters: Preston
- Employees: 488 (on 31 March 2025)
- Organisation executives: Richard Blakeway, Housing Ombudsman; Andrea Keenoy, Chief Operating Officer
- Parent department: Ministry of Housing, Communities and Local Government
- Key document: Housing Act 1996
- Website: www.housing-ombudsman.org.uk

The office of the Housing Ombudsman Service is an executive non-departmental public body of the government of the United Kingdom, sponsored by the Ministry of Housing, Communities and Local Government.

The service assists tenants, some leaseholders and some shared ownership residents with complaints, if they rent, lease or have a shared ownership home via a registered provider of social housing or voluntary scheme member.

== Function ==
The Housing Ombudsman Service complaint handling code details how registered providers of social housing and scheme members should respond to complaints. The code is a statutory requirement. The Housing Ombudsman Service monitors scheme members compliance with this.

The Housing Ombudsman Service looks at complaints about registered providers of social housing, such as housing associations and local authorities. Private landlords can become voluntary members of the scheme. The service is free, independent and impartial.

The Housing Ombudsman Service is in place to help people resolve a range of problems related to housing, for example disrepair, that they have not been able to resolve directly with the registered provider of social housing or voluntary scheme member. Before using the service, people are required to complain directly to the provider/landlord and to have ideally completed their complaints process. The service will consider evidence from both sides and decide what should happen to find a resolution.

In addition to assisting tenants, the Housing Ombudsman Service can also help with some leaseholder and shared ownership complaints, if the property is leased from, managed by or part owned by a scheme member.

In June 2018, the All-Party Parliamentary Group for Excellence in the Built Environment called on the government to expand the remit of UK ombudsman schemes to cover private housebuilders. In 2022, the New Homes Ombudsman Service was established as a separate organisation.

The Social Housing (Regulation) Act became law in July 2023. This act gave the Housing Ombudsman Service increased powers, for example, they are now able to order a scheme member to review their policy or practice on a particular issue.

The Housing Ombudsman Service publishes the decisions they make. Their statistics for 2023-2024, showed that the registered providers of social housing that managed the most homes and that had the highest maladministration rates included:

- Birmingham City Council - 86%
- Places for People Homes Limited - 84%
- Southwark Council - 82%
- Southern Housing Group Limited 79%

== Learning from severe maladministration ==
In addition to considering individual cases, the Housing Ombudsman Service issues learnings from severe maladministration reports. These provide the opportunity to learn from a number of individual cases, that share a common subject.

=== Leaks ===
The July 2024 learning from severe maladministration report tackled the issue of leaks, that often lead to damp and mould. This came as the housing sector prepared for Awaab’s Law, further to the death of Awaab Ishak. 27 registered providers of social housing were criticised in the report for how they had dealt with reports of, and complaints about leaks.

=== Disability ===
In January 2025, the report looked at tenants with disabilities, including those with mental health needs. Several providers of registered social housing were named in the report, who had failed to provide adaptations to disabled residents homes and where communication had been unacceptable.

=== Leaseholders ===
Leaseholder complaints were covered in the June 2025 report. This highlighted 12 landlords for badly managing leaseholder complaints. The report detailed a failure by scheme members to accept responsibility for, and complete housing repairs. One leaseholder of a home leased from Southwark Council, had to replace equipment to be able to obtain clean water, after complaints and information from contractors were not dealt with in a timely manner.

=== Windows ===
More recently, in August 2025, the Housing Ombudsman Service reported on issues involving windows. Unacceptable window disrepair problems were highlighted and 16 landlords were named in the report, for example, Lambeth Council was found to have left a child's bedroom window, that was rotten and posed a risk, in disrepair for over three years. In a separate case, Lambeth Council had themselves deemed a window unfit, but took no action for three years. Other cases found they failed to deal with responsive repairs, with the report citing long delays, poor communication and a failure to consider risks to children, vulnerable tenants, and people with health issues.
