= Marland Grange =

Monastic grange in Rochdale, England

Approximate estimate of the location of Marland Grange, Greater Manchester.

Marland Grange in Marland, Rochdale, Lancashire (Greater Manchester from 1974), was a monastic grange founded before 1212. It was a dependency of the Cistercian Stanlow or Stanlaw Abbey in Cheshire, founded in 1178, and of Stanlow's successor from 1296, Whalley Abbey in Lancashire. The grange was still active in 1324. Whalley was dissolved, and its assets disposed of, in 1537, including the abbot's property in Marland. It is not explicitly recorded whether the grange was still active by then, but if it were, it would also have been suppressed and disposed of at that point.

After 1537 the abbey's lands at Marland, including the lake (or mere) which gave the place its name ("mere-land"), passed into lay ownership as the manor of Marland, which formed part of Castleton. The manor house may have been Marland Mere House, now lost, although its location to the north of the lake is shown on a map of 1851. The lake and surrounding area subsequently became the park of Springfield House, lying to the west. In 1927 this became the council-owned Springfield Park, comprising 42 acres and the lake.

The exact location of the former grange buildings in or adjacent to this area is unknown, and there are no physical remains.

== See also ==
- List of monastic houses in Greater Manchester
- List of monastic houses in England
