= Death of Awaab Ishak =

UK death of a child from indoor mould

Awaab Ishak
- Awaab Ishak, aged 2
- Born: 2018; Rochdale, Greater Manchester, England
- Died: 21 December 2020 (aged 2); Royal Oldham Hospital
- Cause of death: Acute airway oedema with severe granulomatous tracheobronchitis due to environmental mould exposure
- Known for: Circumstances of his death being due to mould in his home

Awaab Ishak, a two-year-old child living in a one-bedroom flat at the Ilminster block on Rochdale's Freehold estate, died in December 2020 as a result of a severe respiratory condition. In 2022, a coroner at Rochdale coroner's court ruled that this was caused by prolonged exposure to black mould in his home which had "inadequate ventilation and was not equipped for normal day-to-day living activities which led to excess damp and condensation". Awaab's death led to a change in the law, known as "Awaab's Law".

== Background ==
His father had complained to Rochdale Boroughwide Housing about the mould in 2017 and was told to paint over it. His father and mother, who moved to the UK from Sudan in 2016 and 2017 respectively, said they had "no doubt at all" that they were treated poorly "because we are not from the country and are less aware of how the systems in the UK work". In June 2020, his father instructed solicitors and initiated a claim over the problem. In December 2020, a surveyor described the conditions at his home as "unfit for human habitation".

=== Coroner's report ===
The coroner's report stated that there was an evident gap in the information-sharing between health visitors/midwives/early help services and the GP. Health visitors had raised concerns in July 2020 and the community midwife completed a special circumstances form in September to children's services highlighting the issue. Dr Caroline Taylor, chair of the National Association of Primary Care said "We all write letters to the housing association and we tell our patients we don't feel like it will make any difference." Middleton Primary Care Network – neighbouring the estate – is proposing that social prescribers will be sent to assess patients' housing conditions to strengthen a GP's case to local agencies.

=== Responses ===
Following the coroner's verdict, the company's chief executive Gareth Swarbrick said that he was "truly devastated about Awaab's death and the things we got wrong. We didn't recognise the level of risk to a little boy's health from the mould in the family's home. We allowed a legal disrepair process, widely used in the housing sector, to get in the way of promptly tackling the mould". On 19 November 2022, Swarbrick was dismissed as chief executive of the housing association by its board.

The Housing Ombudsman, Richard Blakeway, exercised his powers to carry out a further investigation to see if the complaint was indicative of wider failure from the landlord. In March 2023, Blakeway's report stated that the housing association's residents had been treated in "dismissive, inappropriate or unsympathetic ways". It concluded that service failures were widespread, including matters of record keeping and communications.

== Legislative changes ==
In February 2023, the Government announced it would implement "Awaab's Law", which will require social housing providers to remedy reported damp and mould within certain time limits. The Housing Secretary Michael Gove made the announcement as he met with Awaab's family in Rochdale. The new law is part of the Social Housing (Regulation) Act 2023 which received Royal assent on 20 July 2023.

Phase 1 of the legislation came into effect on 27 October 2025, requiring social landlords to investigate emergency hazards within 24 hours and begin repairs within 7 days.

== See also ==
- Indoor mould
- Mould health issues
