= Springfield Park (Rochdale) =

Park in Rochdale, United Kingdom

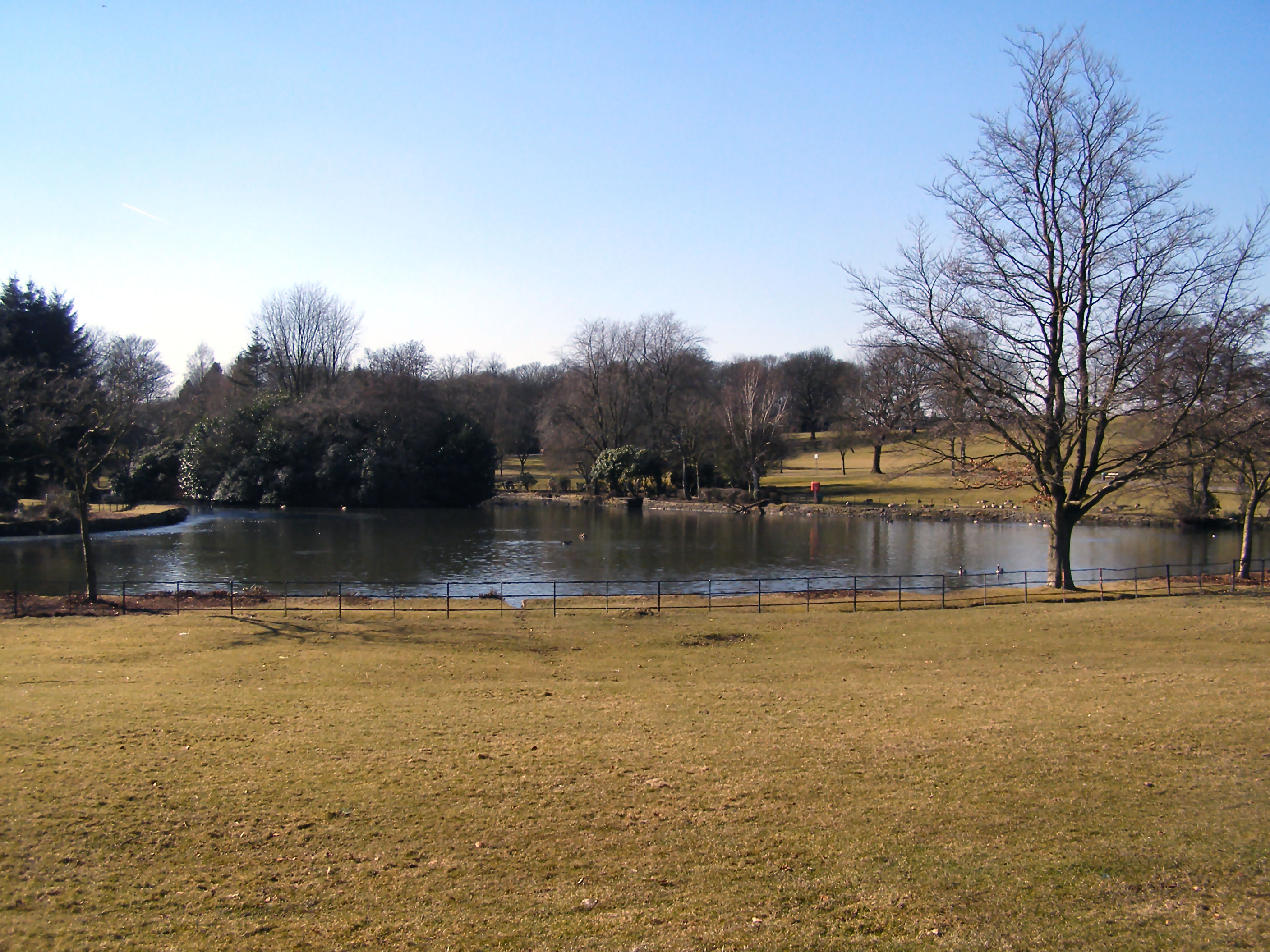
- Springfield Park in winter
- Interactive map of Springfield Park
- Location: Marland, Rochdale, Greater Manchester
- Nearest city: Manchester
- Coordinates: 53.605°N 2.192°W
- Area: 42 acres (17 ha)
- Created: 1927
- Operator: Rochdale Borough Council

Springfield Park is a large public park located between Rochdale and Heywood in Greater Manchester. Completed in 1927 on the former site of a 13th-century monastic grange, it is the largest park in the borough at 42 acres

Attractions include a miniature steam railway, a lake and a children's play area. Sporting facilities include football and cricket pitches, tennis courts, a golf course and a mountaineering course. The park slopes gently down to the River Roch. In 2020, the park received government funding to plant more trees as part of a nationwide project.
