= Number One Riverside =

Municipal building in Rochdale, Greater Manchester, England

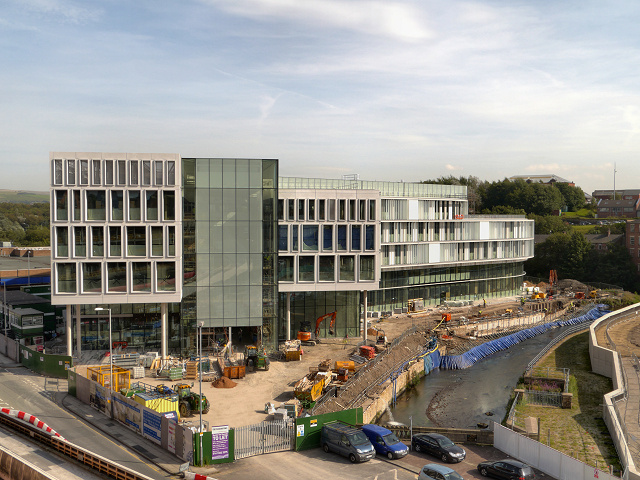
- The building in 2012

- Location within Greater Manchester

General information
- Type: Local government offices, library
- Location: Smith Street, Rochdale, Greater Manchester, England
- Coordinates: 53.617°N 2.1537°W
- Construction started: March 2011; 15 years ago
- Completed: December 2012; 13 years ago
- Opened: March 2013; 13 years ago
- Cost: £42.5 million

Technical details
- Material: Portland stone
- Floor count: 5
- Floor area: 17,000 m^{2} (180,000 sq ft)

Design and construction
- Architecture firm: FaulknerBrowns Architects
- Structural engineer: Curtins Consulting
- Main contractor: Sir Robert McAlpine

Other information
- Public transit: Rochdale Interchange; Rochdale Town Centre tram stop

Website
- Official website

Number One Riverside is a multi-use public building on Smith Street in Rochdale, Greater Manchester, England. It houses Rochdale Metropolitan Borough Council's civic offices and customer service centre, Rochdale Central Library, conference facilities for community use, and office space for third parties. The publicly accessible ground floor includes restaurant and café spaces overlooking the River Roch. The building was designed by FaulknerBrowns Architects and opened to the public in March 2013.

The contemporary structure was designed to be energy efficient and incorporates renewable and low-carbon technologies, including a biomass boiler, photovoltaic panels to generate electricity, and solar panels to assist with water heating. Its green roof was designed to harvest rainwater and provide insulation.

The development of Number One Riverside enabled the council to consolidate its estate from 33 separate sites into a single building.

== History ==
Number One Riverside replaced the municipal offices, locally known as "The Black Box," which were demolished in 2014 along with the bus station and multi-storey car park to make way for the Rochdale Riverside retail and leisure development.

Following severe flooding on Boxing Day 2015, much of Number One Riverside was closed, and the library did not reopen until 2017.

From February to June 2020, Number One Riverside hosted Dippy the dinosaur, the Natural History Museum's cast of a Diplodocus skeleton, as part of a nationwide tour.

== Transport links ==
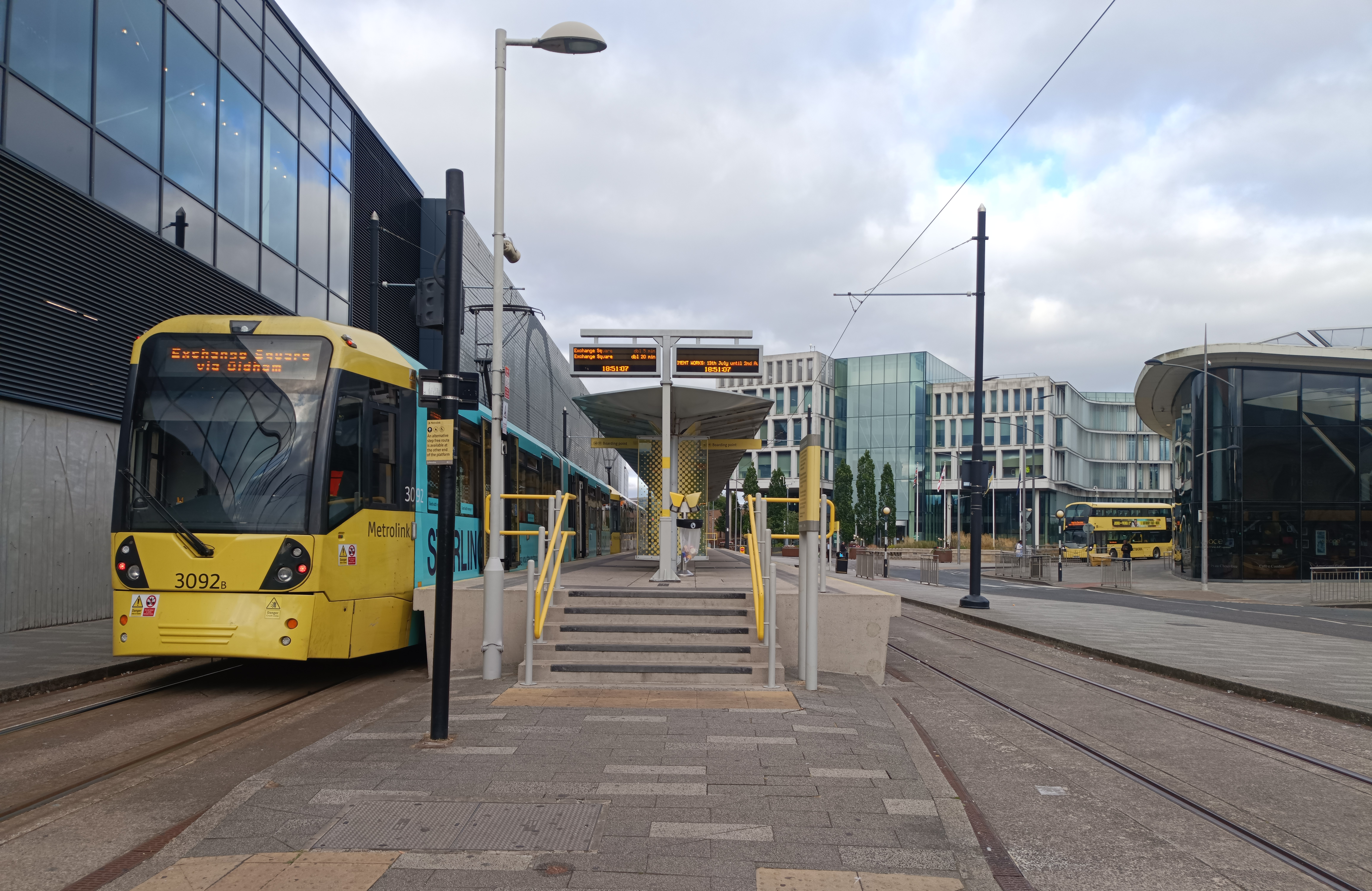
Rochdale Town Centre tram stop, outside Number One Riverside

Rochdale Town Centre tram stop, on the Oldham and Rochdale Line of the Metrolink system, is located directly outside Number One Riverside. Rochdale Interchange is also adjacent to the building, on the opposite side of the River Roch.

== See also ==
- Rochdale Town Hall, the borough's principal civic building and architectural landmark
