= Social Housing (Regulation) Act 2023 =

Act of the Parliament of the United Kingdom

Social Housing (Regulation) Act 2023 (Note: Section 47.)
- Act of Parliament
- Parliament of the United Kingdom
- Long title: An Act to make provision about the regulation of social housing; about the terms of approved schemes for the investigation of housing complaints; about the powers and duties of a housing ombudsman appointed under an approved scheme; about hazards affecting social housing; and for connected purposes.
- Citation: 2023 c. 36
- Introduced by: Michael Gove, Secretary of State for Levelling Up, Housing and Communities (Commons); The Baroness Scott of Bybrook, Parliamentary Under-Secretary of State for Social Housing and Faith (Lords)
- Territorial extent: England and Wales (Note: Section 45.)

Dates
- Royal assent: 20 July 2023
- Commencement: Various (Note: Section 46.)
Other legislation
Amends	Landlord and Tenant Act 1985; Housing Act 1996; Housing and Regeneration Act 2008; Localism Act 2011; Housing and Planning Act 2016; Leasehold Reform (Ground Rent) Act 2022

Status: Current legislation

History of passage through Parliament

Records of Parliamentary debate relating to the statute from Hansard

Text of statute as originally enacted

The Social Housing (Regulation) Act 2023 (c. 36) is an act of the Parliament of the United Kingdom which introduced new measures to improve the standards, safety and operation of social housing. The bill was introduced in the House of Lords on 8 June 2022 and received royal assent on 20 July 2023.

Described by the government as a "landmark law", the act makes changes following the Grenfell Tower fire and the Death of Awaab Ishak.

== Background ==
The years prior to the passing of this act saw some of the most serious events in social housing.

The Grenfell Tower Fire in June 2017, which caused 72 deaths, brought significant attention and criticism to the standards and safety of social housing, as well as accusations of not listening to tenants' concerns and complaints.

In August 2018, the government published the Social Housing Green Paper: A New Deal for Social Housing, alongside a public consultation which ran August–November 2018. Proposals centred on "rebalancing of the relationship between residents and landlords", ensuring social homes are safe and decent, whilst issues are resolved and residents’ voices are heard. Following this, in November 2020, the Charter for Social Housing Residents: Social Housing White Paper was published. The paper set out the key measures for changing and strengthening the regulatory regime, that the government intended to implement, stating many of the changes would require legislation.

Social housing made the headlines again in March 2021, when ITV News broke a story of "appalling" conditions in council housing. The story led to a year-long investigation by the news channel, which highlighted that the poor conditions were far more widespread, affecting "thousands" of social housing tenants. The exposure and the scale of the failings, found by the ITV investigation, led to an MP's inquiry. The Regulation of Social Housing Inquiry was launched in November 2021 and published their report on 20 July 2022.

In November 2022, a critical coroner's report was published, following the death of toddler Awaab Ishak two years earlier. The cause of death being prolonged exposure to mould in his home, added further momentum to social housing reforms. Michael Gove the Secretary of State for Levelling Up, Housing and Communities responded by admitting the government had been too slow to toughen the regulation of social housing. Gove later announced, in January 2023, that he had plans for 'Awaab's Law', through an amendment to this Bill. Changes would relate to hazards (such as mould) in social homes and their remedy within specified time limits.

== Overview ==
The passing of this act has been described as "the most significant reform of the sector in more than a decade", with other housing advocates making comments such as:

The passing of the Social Housing Regulation Act is a historic moment for the nearly nine million people who live in social homes in England.

— Polly Neate, chief executive of Shelter

The act is intended to enable a new, proactive approach to regulating social housing landlords, ensuring that standards are met on matters such as safety, transparency and tenant engagement. There will be new enforcement powers to take action against failing landlords. The Act itself describes its intent as being to “reform the regulatory regime to drive significant change in landlord behaviour”.

== Contents ==
The main measures in the act are:

- strengthening the power of the Regulator of Social Housing to carry out regular inspections of the largest social housing providers and the power to issue unlimited fines to rogue social landlords
- additional Housing Ombudsman powers to publish best practice guidance to landlords following investigations into tenant complaints
- powers to set strict time limits for social landlords to address hazards such as damp and mould ('Awaab's Law')
- new qualification requirements for social housing managers
- introducing stronger economic powers to follow inappropriate money transactions outside of the sector

=== Strengthening the regulator ===
A significant reform is the removal of the "serious detriment test". The previous measure, set out in the Housing and Regeneration Act 2008, is removed by Section 26 of this Act. Previously, this "test" acted as a barrier to the Regulator of Social Housing getting involved unless they had reason to believe residents were at risk of a "serious detriment". Removing this means that, not only is there is no longer a threshold for reactive enforcement, but there can now be a proactive monitoring of the standards. In practice, this would mean regular planned or short-notice inspections, in the style of Ofsted, with as little as 48-hours' notice.

Where the regulator does find breaches of standards, the £5,000 limit on the fines, which can be imposed, is amended by Section 36 and Schedule 3, paragraph 6 of this Act to be ‘unlimited’.

=== Awaab's Law ===
'Awaab's Law' is set out at section 42 of the act, and although the act, as a whole, applies to England and Wales, this part applies to England only. It also only covers social housing, so does not extend to the private rented sector, although there have been calls for it to do so.

Awaab's Law was an addition to the originally tabled Bill, through an amendment added on 10 February 2023. The amendment was laid by the Secretary of State for Levelling Up, Housing and Communities, Michael Gove and, in an announcement of the move, Gove explained the new law, in memory of Awaab Ishak, will "force social landlords to fix their homes within strict new time limits". The law is worded to cover ‘remedying of hazards’, so 'hazards' will include more than just damp and mould. Prescribed hazards are currently listed as part of the Housing Health and Safety Rating System (HHSRS), so could include other matters such as hot or cold temperatures, excessive noise, poor lighting and so forth, where it is hazardous to an occupant's health.

The act is the means of implementation of these measures, rather than the measures themselves, so changes do not come into force with the passing of the act. They take the form of an amendment to the Landlord and Tenant Act 1985 which will empower the Secretary of State to make secondary legislation which will bring detail and the measures into force at a later date.

As of August 2023, the next step to bring Awaab's Law into effect, will be for the government to publish a consultation. The government have said this will take place before the end of 2023. It will help decide and set the timescales within which social landlords will have to act to investigate hazards and make repairs. It will also inform how the legislation is best implemented. These timescales, although yet to be decided, have been suggested to be of the order of fourteen days to investigate and a further seven days to carry out the necessary repairs. Once decided, the detail and rules will then be set out in secondary legislation to form part of an occupant's social housing tenancy agreement, so tenants can hold landlords to account through the courts, for breach of tenancy, if they fail to provide a decent home.

== Related legislation ==
Supported Housing (Regulatory Oversight) Act 2023 (Note: Section 14(5).)
- Act of Parliament
- Parliament of the United Kingdom
- Long title: An Act to make provision about the regulation of supported exempt accommodation; to make provision about local authority oversight of, and enforcement powers relating to, the provision of supported exempt accommodation; and for connected purposes.
- Citation: 2023 c. 26
- Territorial extent: England and Wales (Note: Section 14(1).)

Dates
- Royal assent: 29 June 2023
- Commencement: 29 June 2023 (section 14); 29 August 2023 (rest of act); (Note: Section 14(2)–(4).)
Other legislation
Amends	Housing Act 1996

Status: Current legislation

Text of statute as originally enacted

The Supported Housing (Regulatory Oversight) Act 2023 (c. 26) is an act of the Parliament of the United Kingdom also passed in 2023 concerning the regulation of Supported Exempt Accommodation (SEA) including "local authority oversight of, and enforcement powers relating to, the provision of supported exempt accommodation", i.e. properties which provide accommodation for people who also need care services, support or supervision, hostels and refuges. In Birmingham, more than 34,000 people live in SEA.

The act established a new statutory duty for local authorities to formulate and publish a Local Supported Housing Strategy before 31 March 2027.

=== Criticism of Supported Exempt Accommodation ===
A 2026 BBC Panorama investigation has reported that the SEA system turns some residents into "cash cows to generate income". The investigation found that most welfare payments are made to non-profit companies, who hire profit-making companies, thereby creating income for landlords.
