= Housing Act 1996 =

Act of the Parliament of the United Kingdom

Housing Act 1996 (Note: Section 233.)
- Act of Parliament
- Parliament of the United Kingdom
- Long title: An Act to make provision about housing, including provision about the social rented sector, houses in multiple occupation, landlord and tenant matters, the administration of housing benefit, the conduct of tenants, the allocation of housing accommodation by local housing authorities and homelessness; and for connected purposes.
- Citation: 1996 c. 52
- Territorial extent: England and Wales; Scotland (in part); Northern Ireland (in part); (Note: Section 231.)

Dates
- Royal assent: 24 July 1996
- Commencement: Various (Note: Section 232.)
Other legislation
Amends	National Heritage Act 1983; Housing Associations Act 1985; Planning (Listed Buildings and Conservation Areas) Act 1990; Social Security Contributions and Benefits Act 1992; Social Security Administration Act 1992; Social Security (Consequential Provisions) Act 1992; Agricultural Tenancies Act 1995; Arbitration Act 1996
Amended by	Audit Commission Act 1998; Immigration and Asylum Act 1999; Countryside and Rights of Way Act 2000; Land Registration Act 2002; Commonhold and Leasehold Reform Act 2002; Mental Health Act 2007; Charities Act 2011; Co-operative and Community Benefit Societies Act 2014; Deregulation Act 2015; Corporate Insolvency and Governance Act 2020; Sentencing Act 2020; Domestic Abuse Act 2021; Supported Housing (Regulatory Oversight) Act 2023; Social Housing (Regulation) Act 2023; Renters' Rights Act 2025
Relates to	Housing Grants, Construction and Regeneration Act 1996

Status: Amended

Text of statute as originally enacted

Text of the Housing Act 1996 as in force today (including any amendments) within the United Kingdom, from legislation.gov.uk.

The Housing Act 1996 (c. 52) is an act of the Parliament of the United Kingdom. Part VI of the act concerns permanent allocation of housing, while part VII concerns the duties that a local authority has towards homeless people and when these duties arise.

== Provisions ==
- Section 1 established a register of social landlords, to be maintained by the Housing Corporation.
- Sections 175(3) and 191(1) concern the circumstances in which a person currently in accommodation may also be considered "homeless". The circumstances would depend on whether it is "reasonable to continue to occupy" the accommodation. Case law (Moran v Manchester City Council, 2009 UKHL 36) has confirmed that a woman living in a refuge who has left her home because of domestic violence remains homeless.
- Section 189 concerns the "priority need" hurdle that a homelessness application must pass for a council to have a duty to provide interim accommodation.

== See also ==
- Homelessness Act 2002
