= Rochdale =

Town in Greater Manchester, England

Coordinates: 53.61°N 2.16°W

- Town
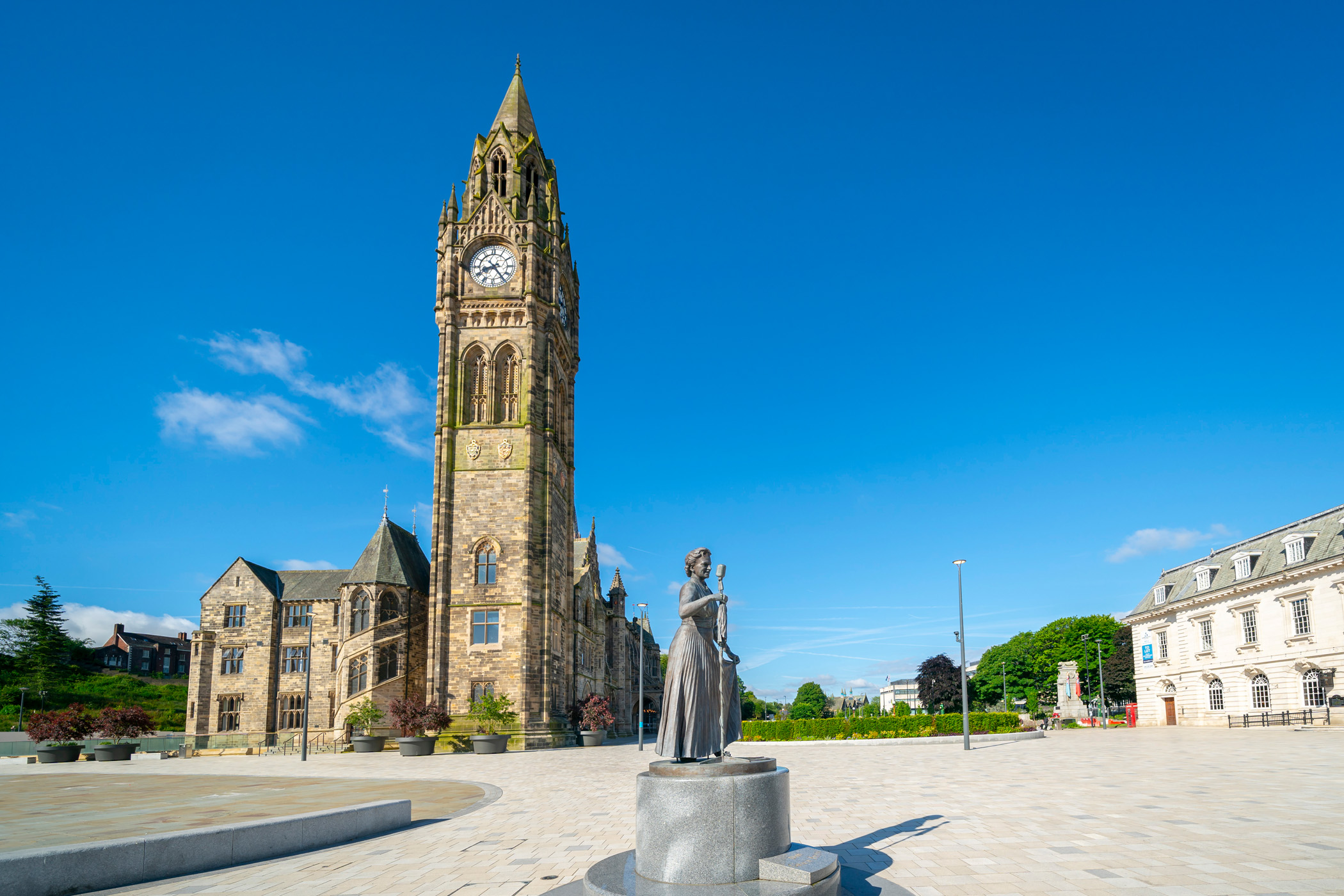
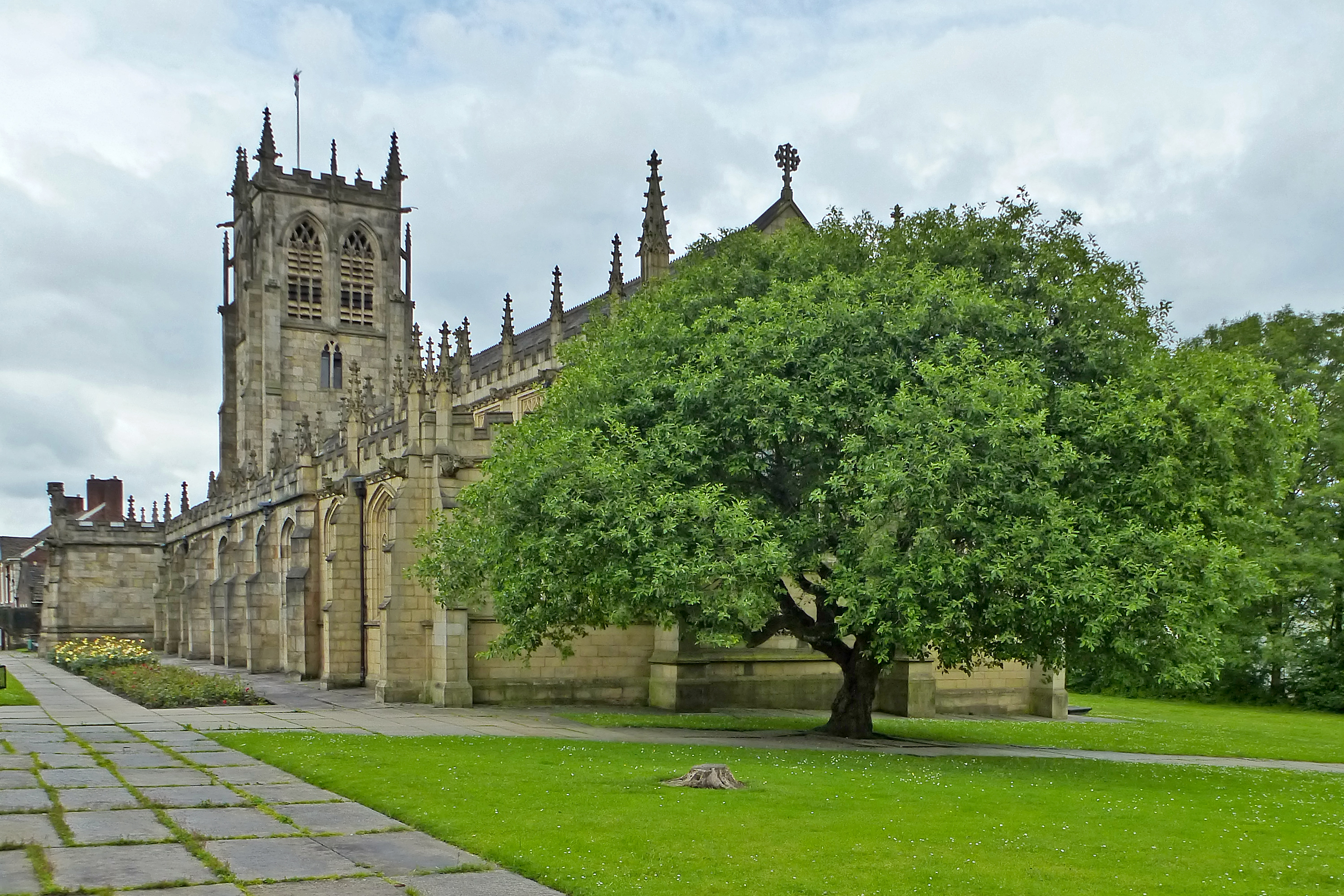
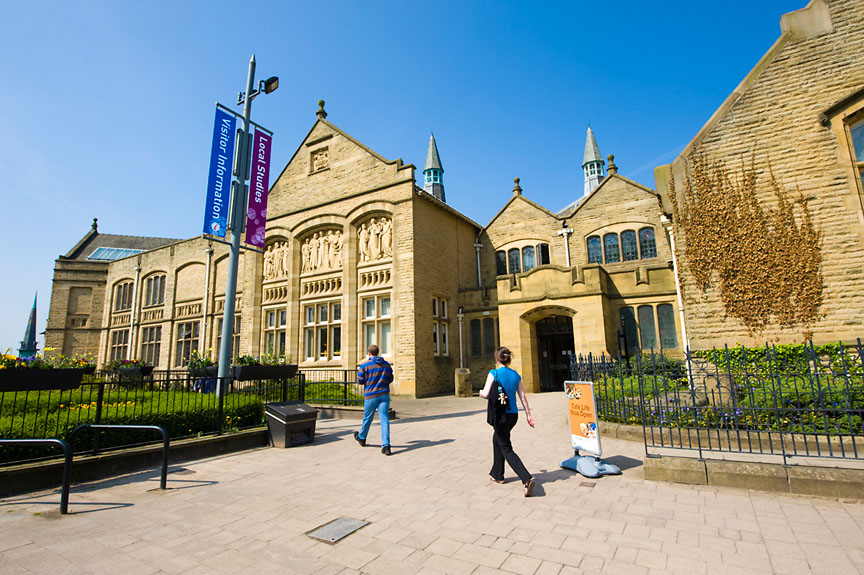
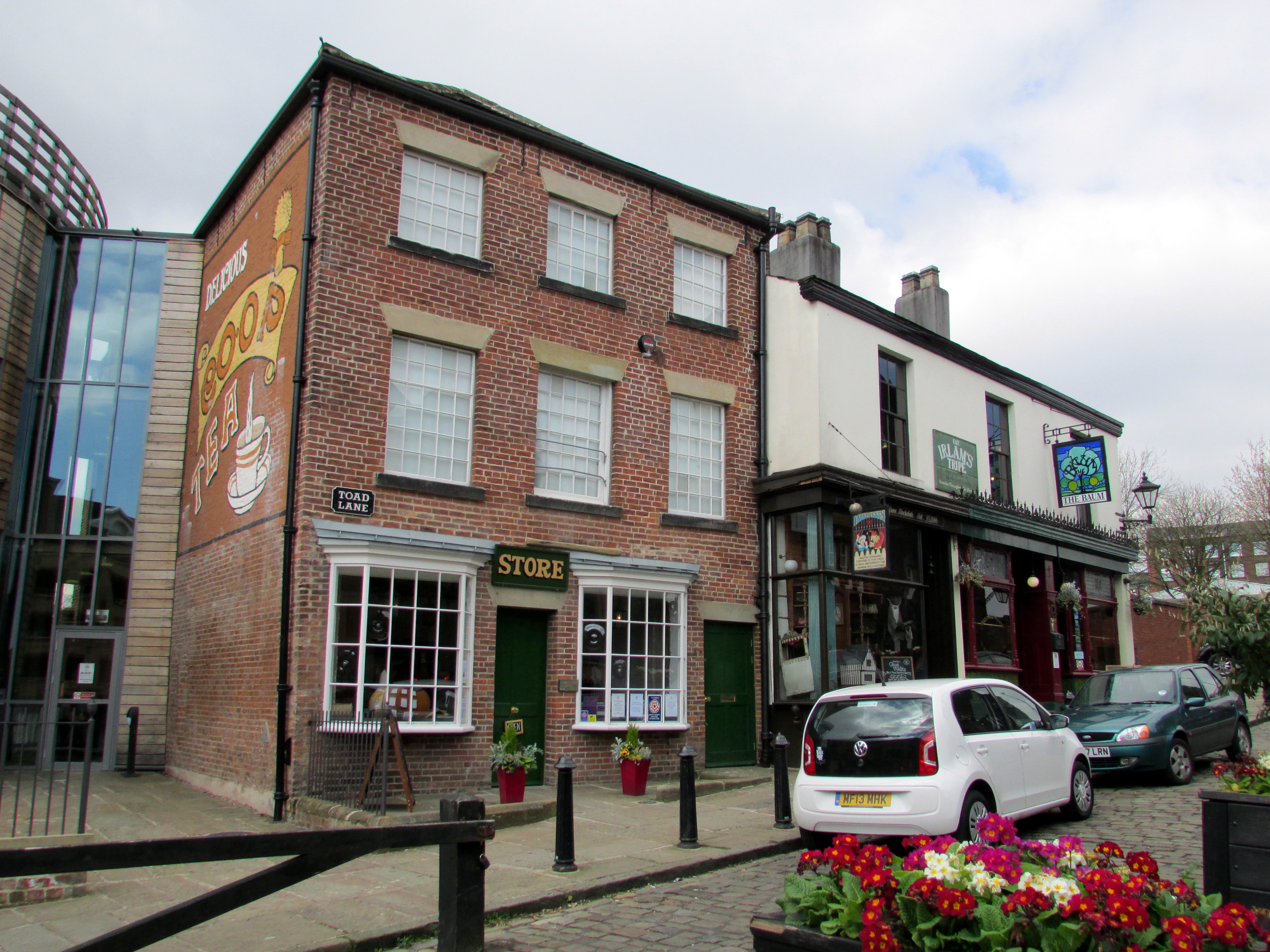
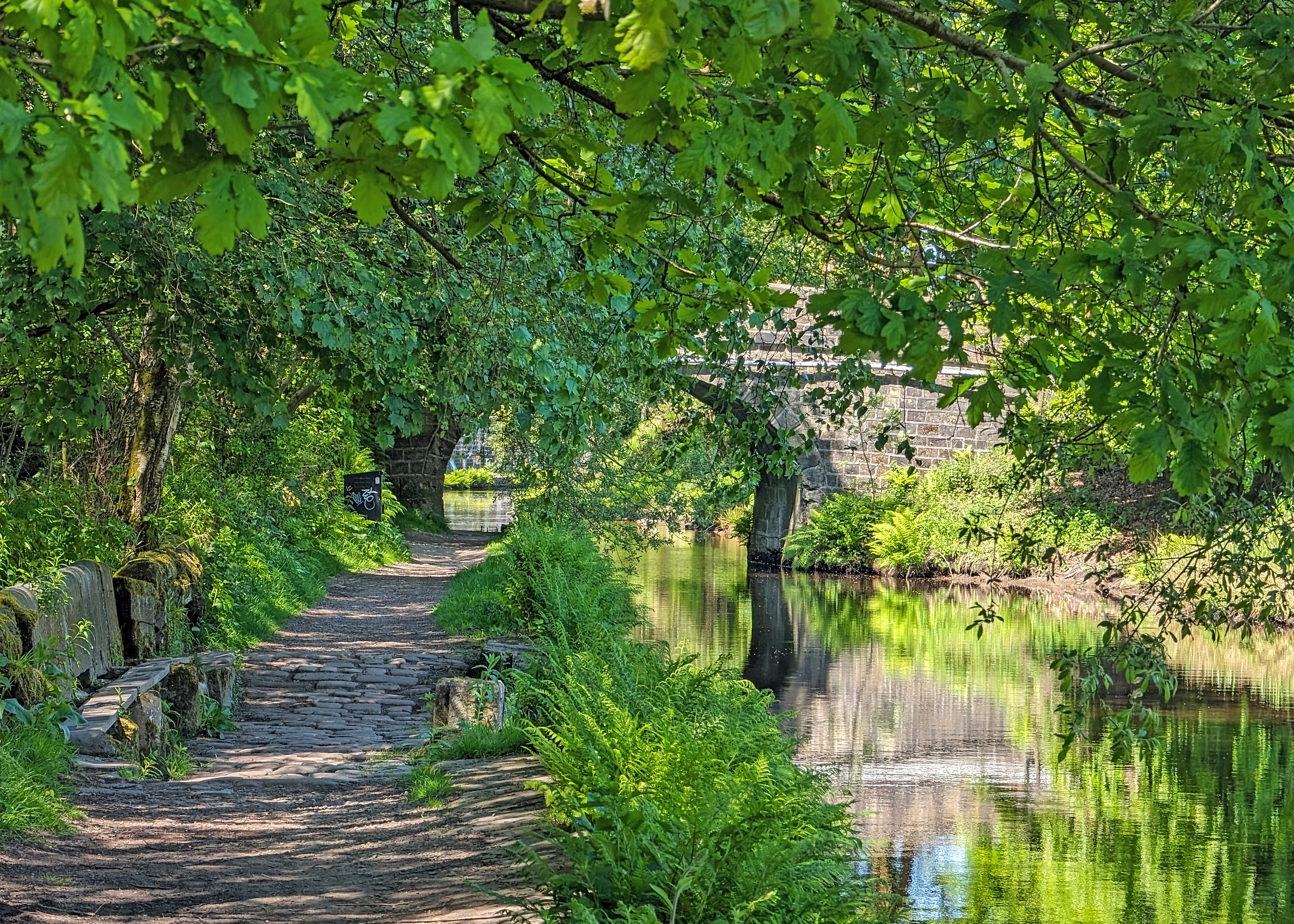
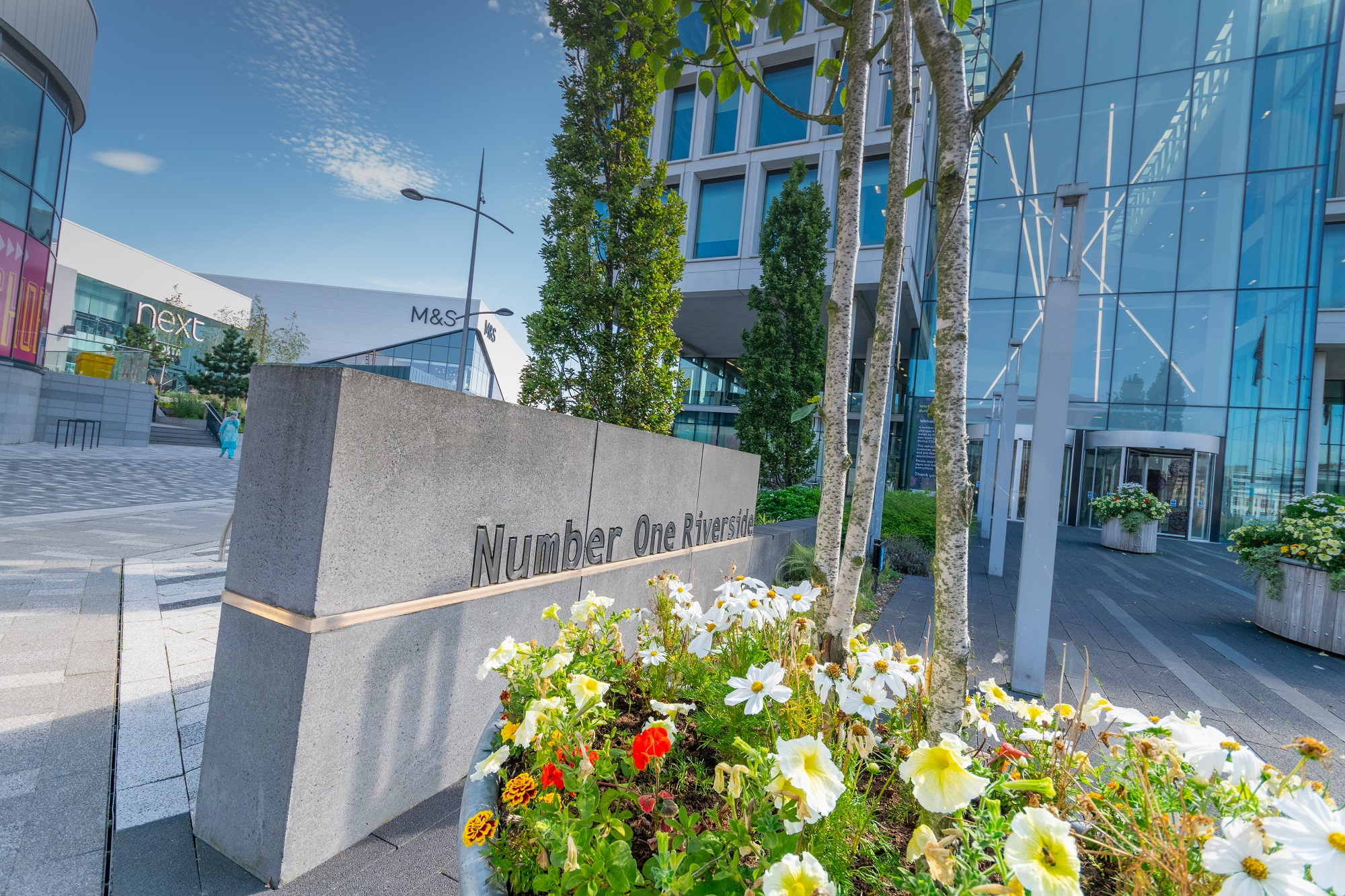
- Town Hall St Chad's Church Touchstones Pioneers Museum Canal Number One Riverside

- Location within Greater Manchester
- Area: 22 sq mi (57 km^{2})
- Population: 111,261
  - Density: 5,057/sq mi (1,953/km^{2})
- OS grid reference: SD893130
  - London: 222 mi (357 km) SSE
- Metropolitan borough: Rochdale
- Metropolitan county: Greater Manchester
- Region: North West
- Country: England
- Sovereign state: United Kingdom
- Post town: ROCHDALE
- Postcode district: OL11, OL12, OL16
- Dialling code: 01706
- Police: Greater Manchester
- Fire: Greater Manchester
- Ambulance: North West
- UK Parliament: Rochdale; Heywood and Middleton

Rochdale (/ˈrɒtʃdeɪl/ ROTCH-dayl) is a town in Greater Manchester, England, and the administrative centre of the Metropolitan Borough of Rochdale. In the 2021 Census, the town had a population of 111,261, compared to 223,773 for the wider borough. Rochdale is in the foothills of the South Pennines and lies in the dale (valley) of the River Roch, 5 miles (8 km) north-west of Oldham and 10 miles (16 km) north-east of Manchester.

Rochdale's recorded history begins with an entry in the Domesday Book of 1086 as Recedham Manor, but can be traced back to the 9th century. The ancient parish of Rochdale was a division of the Salford Hundred and one of the larger ecclesiastical parishes in England, comprising several townships. By 1251, the town had become of such importance that it was granted a royal charter.

The town became a centre of northern England's woollen trade and, by the early 18th century, was described as being "remarkable for its many wealthy merchants." In the 19th century, it became a mill town and centre for textile manufacture during the Industrial Revolution. The town lies within the historic county of Lancashire and was a county borough within it before 1974.

== History ==
=== Toponymy ===
The town is recorded as Recedham in the Domesday Book and Rachetham in 1193. Variations of Rechedham continue into the 13th century when the first element's termination is dropped as Rachedam became Racheham. This change was soon followed with the suffix -ham (homestead) changing to -dale (wide valley).

Rachdale is recorded as a name for the town in 1242, but may have been used earlier as a name for the valley, Hundred and Parish. The Domesday Book's rendering of the name led Eilert Ekwall to suggest a derivation from reced, an obscure Old English element meaning "hall".

Although the name of the river is still pronounced /roʊtʃ/ (with a long vowel sound), Rochdale is pronounced /ˈrɒtʃdeɪl/ (with a shorter o sound).

=== Early history ===
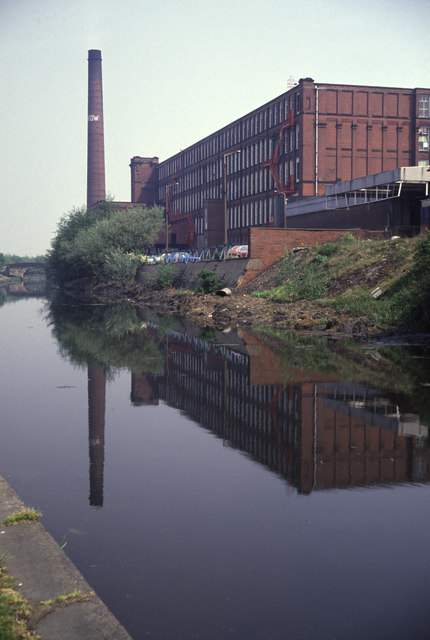
Arrow Mill is a former cotton mill and Grade II listed building in Castleton.

A Roman road, leading from Mamucium (Manchester) to Eboracum (York), crossed the moors at Blackstone Edge.

Rochdale was subjected to incursions by the Danes; the castle that Castleton is named after, and of which no trace remains, was one of twelve Saxon forts possibly destroyed in frequent conflicts that occurred between the Saxons and Danes during the 10th and 11th centuries. At the time of the Norman Conquest, the manor was held by a Saxon thegn, Gamel. Rochdale appears in the Domesday Book of 1086 as Recedham and was described as lying within the hundred of Salford and the county of Cheshire. At that time, Rochdale was under the lordship of Roger the Poitevin. Before 1212, Henry II granted the manor to Roger de Lacy, whose family retained it as part of the Honour of Clitheroe until it passed to the Dukes of Lancaster by marriage and then to the Crown by 1399. In medieval times, weekly markets were held from 1250 when Edmund de Lacy obtained a grant for a market and an annual fair.

John Byron bought the manor in 1638 and it was sold by the poet, Lord Byron, to the Deardens in 1823, who hold the title. Rochdale did not have a manor house but the Orchard, built in 1702 and acquired in 1745 by Simon Dearden, was the home of the lords of the manor after 1823. It was described as "a red-brick building of no architectural distinction, on the north side of the river opposite the town hall" and sometimes referred to as the Manor House. It was demolished in 1922.

=== Industrial Revolution ===
Rochdale is a product of the Industrial Revolution, though the manufacture of woollen cloth, particularly baize, kerseys and flannels, was locally important as far back as the 1500s. At that time, the textile industry was rooted in the domestic system but, towards the end of the 18th century, mills powered by water started to appear.

Water power was replaced by steam power in the 19th century and local coal became important. The Deardens who were lords of the manor were among the local coal mine owners. By the mid-1800s, the woollen trade was declining and the cotton trade was rapidly growing in importance. Cotton manufacturing took advantage of new technological developments in spinning and weaving. In 1804, the Rochdale Canal opened, providing the first link over the Pennines between Lancashire and Yorkshire.

During the 19th century, Rochdale became one of the world's most prominent cotton processing towns rising to prominence and becoming a major centre for textile manufacture during the Industrial Revolution. It was a boomtown of the Industrial Revolution and was amongst the first ever industrialised towns. By the end of the 19th century, Rochdale had woollen mills, silk manufacturers, bleachers and dyers, though cotton spinning and weaving were the dominant industries in the community. Turner & Newall was founded in Rochdale in 1871 to produce cotton-based mechanical packing, and in 1879 it became the first business in the United Kingdom to weave asbestos cloth with power-driven machinery.

The socioeconomic change brought by the success of Rochdale's textile industry in the 19th century led to its rise to borough status and it became an important regional town based upon this economic success.

The Rochdale Pioneers opened the first Co-operative shop in Toad Lane in 1844. The reformer and Member of Parliament, John Bright (1811–1889), was born in Rochdale and gained a reputation as a leader of political dissent and supporter of the Anti-Corn Law League.

=== Decline of textile manufacturing ===
By the middle of the 20th century, Rochdale's economy was in decline, reflecting the broader economic situation in other textile manufacturing towns in North West England. This decline was largely driven by the global availability of cheaper textile product offerings from abroad.

During the 1950s and 1960s, Rochdale's lack of a diverse economic base became very apparent, with the closure of numerous textile manufacturing facilities. Textile manufacturing did remain a major contributor to the local economy, even into the 1970s. Regionally, numerous companies still have some connection to the textile industry.

== Governance ==
The coat of arms of the former municipal borough, later the County Borough of Rochdale council, granted 20 February 1857. The arms incorporate references to Rochdale's early industries and lords.

Lying within the historic county boundaries of Lancashire since the early 12th century, Rochdale was recorded in 1066 as held by Gamel, one of the twenty-one thegns of the Hundred of Salfordshire.

The ancient ecclesiastical parish of Rochdale was divided into four townships: Butterworth, Castleton, Hundersfield and Spotland. Hundersfield was later divided into four townships: Blatchinworth, Calderbrook, Wardleworth and Wuerdle & Wardle.

Excluding the large chapelry of Saddleworth, which lay entirely in Yorkshire, the parish of Rochdale had an area of 65.4 square miles (169.4 km^{2}).

In 1825, commissioners for the social and economic improvement of the town were established. The town became part of a parliamentary borough in 1832. As there were no existing township boundaries, the commissioners and later the parliamentary constituency were deemed to cover a circular area extending three-quarters of a mile from the old market-place.

Under the terms of the Poor Law Amendment Act 1834, the town became the head of Rochdale Poor Law Union, which was established on 15 February 1837, despite considerable local opposition. In 1856, Rochdale was incorporated as a municipal borough, giving it borough status in the United Kingdom, and it obtained the powers of the improvement commissioners after 1858.

In 1872, the remaining area of Wardleworth township and parts of Castleton, Wuerdle and Wardle, Spotland and Butterworth townships were added to the borough.

When the administrative county of Lancashire was created by the Local Government Act 1888, Rochdale was elevated to become the County Borough of Rochdale and was, in modern terms, a unitary authority area exempt from the administration of Lancashire County Council. In 1900, most of Castleton Urban District was added to the borough; this urban district included parts of Castleton, Hopwood and Thornham townships. In 1933, parts of Norden Urban District and Birtle with Bamford civil parish were added to the borough.

Under the Local Government Act 1972, the town's autonomous county borough status was abolished. The municipal boroughs of Middleton and Heywood and Littleborough, Milnrow and Wardle urban districts are now part of the Metropolitan Borough of Rochdale, one of the ten metropolitan boroughs in Greater Manchester.

=== Parliamentary representation ===
The Rochdale constituency was created by the Reform Act of 1832. The constituency was held for two decades during the 20th century by Cyril Smith, first of the Liberal Party and then of the Liberal Democrats.

Following the 2010 general election, the town was represented by Simon Danczuk, who was elected as a Labour MP but was subsequently suspended and placed under investigation by the Labour Party.

Tony Lloyd (Labour) was elected as MP for the Rochdale constituency in the 2017 general election and represented the constituency until his death on 17 January 2024. The seat was subsequently won by George Galloway, leader and founder of the Workers Party of Britain, in the 2024 Rochdale by-election on 29 February; the campaign was dominated by opposition to British involvement in the Gaza war. Six months later, Galloway was defeated in the 2024 election by Labour's Paul Waugh.

== Geography ==
Rochdale is approximately 450 feet (137 m) above sea level, 10 miles (16 km) north-north-east of Manchester city centre, in the valley of the River Roch. Blackstone Edge, Saddleworth Moor and the South Pennines are close to the east; on all other sides, Rochdale is bound by other towns and villages including Whitworth, Littleborough, Milnrow, Royton, Heywood and Shaw and Crompton, with little or no green space between them.

Rochdale's built environment consists of a mixture of infrastructure, housing types and commercial buildings from a number of periods. Its housing stock is mixed, but has a significant amount of stone or red-brick terraced houses from the late 19th and early 20th centuries.

The Town Hall, seven large tower blocks (locally known as the Seven Sisters) and a number of former cotton mills mark the town's skyline. The urban structure of Rochdale is regular when compared to most towns in England; its form is restricted in places by its hilly upland terrain.

Much of Rochdale's built environment is centred around a central business district in the town centre, which is the local centre of both the town and borough.

There are a mixture of high-density urban areas, suburbs, semi-rural and rural locations in Rochdale, but overwhelmingly the land use in the town is urban.

For purposes of the Office for National Statistics, the Borough of Rochdale forms the fifth-largest settlement of the Greater Manchester Urban Area, the United Kingdom's second-largest conurbation.

=== Divisions and suburbs ===
- Ashworth
- Balderstone
- Bamford
- Belfield
- Buckley
- Buersil
- Burnedge
- Caldershaw
- Castleton
- Cronkeyshaw
- Cutgate
- Deeplish
- Dernley
- Falinge
- Fieldhouse
- Firgrove
- Foxholes
- Halfacre
- Hamer
- Healey
- Hurstead
- Kingsway
- Kirkholt
- Littleborough
- Lowerfold
- Lowerplace
- Marland
- Meanwood
- Newbold
- Nook Farm
- Norden
- Oakenrod
- Oulder Hill
- Passmonds
- Prickshaw
- Rooley Moor
- Shawclough
- Smallbridge
- Smithy Bridge
- Sparth Bottom
- Spotland
- Sudden
- Syke
- Thornham
- Turf Hill
- Wardleworth

=== Climate ===
Like much of the British Isles, Rochdale experiences a temperate maritime climate, with relatively cool summers and mild winters.

Climate data for Rochdale (1991–2020)
Month	Jan	Feb	Mar	Apr	May	Jun	Jul	Aug	Sep	Oct	Nov	Dec	Year
Record high °C (°F)	14.2 (57.6)	20.4 (68.7)	21.7 (71.1)	25.8 (78.4)	27.3 (81.1)	30.3 (86.5)	37.2 (99.0)	31.1 (88.0)	28.3 (82.9)	26.7 (80.1)	16.9 (62.4)	15.0 (59.0)	37.2 (99.0)
Mean daily maximum °C (°F)	6.9 (44.4)	7.5 (45.5)	9.6 (49.3)	12.5 (54.5)	15.6 (60.1)	18.2 (64.8)	20.0 (68.0)	19.6 (67.3)	17.1 (62.8)	13.4 (56.1)	9.7 (49.5)	7.2 (45.0)	13.1 (55.6)
Daily mean °C (°F)	4.2 (39.6)	4.4 (39.9)	6.0 (42.8)	8.5 (47.3)	11.4 (52.5)	14.2 (57.6)	16.0 (60.8)	15.7 (60.3)	13.3 (55.9)	10.1 (50.2)	6.8 (44.2)	4.3 (39.7)	9.6 (49.3)
Mean daily minimum °C (°F)	1.5 (34.7)	1.4 (34.5)	2.5 (36.5)	4.5 (40.1)	7.2 (45.0)	10.1 (50.2)	11.9 (53.4)	11.8 (53.2)	9.6 (49.3)	6.8 (44.2)	3.9 (39.0)	1.5 (34.7)	6.1 (43.0)
Record low °C (°F)	−12.2 (10.0)	−12.2 (10.0)	−8.9 (16.0)	−4.9 (23.2)	−1.7 (28.9)	0.6 (33.1)	2.2 (36.0)	1.1 (34.0)	−1.1 (30.0)	−5.6 (21.9)	−8.3 (17.1)	−11.1 (12.0)	−12.2 (10.0)
Average precipitation mm (inches)	119.2 (4.69)	97.1 (3.82)	89.9 (3.54)	68.4 (2.69)	65.7 (2.59)	82.9 (3.26)	96.9 (3.81)	100.2 (3.94)	97.8 (3.85)	116.8 (4.60)	123.5 (4.86)	138.9 (5.47)	1,197.2 (47.13)
Average precipitation days (≥ 1.0 mm)	17.1	13.7	13.4	11.8	10.9	12.6	13.1	14.8	13.2	15.3	17.2	17.6	170.8
Mean monthly sunshine hours	32.2	49.8	98.9	152.7	175.4	152.8	170.8	153.5	116.3	78.7	41.6	42.7	1,265.5
Source 1: Met Office
Source 2: Starlings Roost Weather

== Demography ==
=== 2001 ===
In 1971, around 4,435 (4.8%) people in Rochdale were born in the New Commonwealth.

At the 2001 UK census, Rochdale had a population of 95,796. The population density was 11,186 inhabitants per square mile (4,319/km^{2}), with a 100 to 94.4 female-to-male ratio. Of those over 16 years old, 28.2% were single (never married), 44.0% married and 8.8% divorced. Rochdale's 37,730 households included 30.4% one-person, 36.6% married couples living together, 8.4% were co-habiting couples and 11.1% single parents with their children. Of those aged 16–74, 37.1% had no academic qualifications, similar to the figure for all of Rochdale, but higher than that of 28.9% in all of England. In 2010, Rochdale had the highest number of Jobseeker's Allowance claimants in Greater Manchester, with 6.1 per cent of its adult population claiming the benefit.

Rochdale ethnicity & religion 2001
2001 UK census	Rochdale	Rochdale Borough	England
Total population	95,796	205,357	49,138,831
Ethnicity
White	78.7%	88.6%	91%
Asian	19.9%	9.8%	4.6%
Black	0.3%	0.3%	2.3%
Other	1.1%	1.3%	2.1%
Religion
Christian	62.7%	72.1%	71.7%
Muslim	19.1%	9.4%	3.1%
Other religion	7.8%	7.7%	10.6%
No religion	10.4%	10.8%	14.6%

=== 2011 ===
Rochdale had a population of 107,926, which made it about the same size as Salford and Stockport; this was an increase from 95,796 in 2001. It is one of four townships in the Metropolitan Borough of Rochdale, along with Middleton, Heywood and Pennine (a township which includes Littleborough and Wardle). Rochdale is considered an Urban Subdivision by the local borough council.

Rochdale ethnicity 2011
Rochdale compared 2011	Rochdale	Rochdale (Borough)
White British	65.2%	78.6%
Asian	27.5%	14.9%
Black	1.5%	1.3%

34.8% of Rochdale's population were non-White British, compared with 21.4% for the surrounding borough. Rochdale town also has almost double the percentage of Asians compared with the Metropolitan Borough of Rochdale, which had a population of 211,699 in 2011. This means that the town takes up almost 55% of the borough's population.

=== 2021 ===
The town of Rochdale's population was enumerated at 111,261; its ethnic makeup was 57.2% White, 34.3% Asian, 2.6% Mixed, 3.4% Black, 2.1% Other and 0.5% Arab. The town's religious makeup was 38% Christian, 36% Muslim, 24.2% No Religion and has small Hindu, Sikh, Buddhist and Jewish communities.

More than 40% of children in the Rochdale borough are living in poverty.

== Landmarks ==
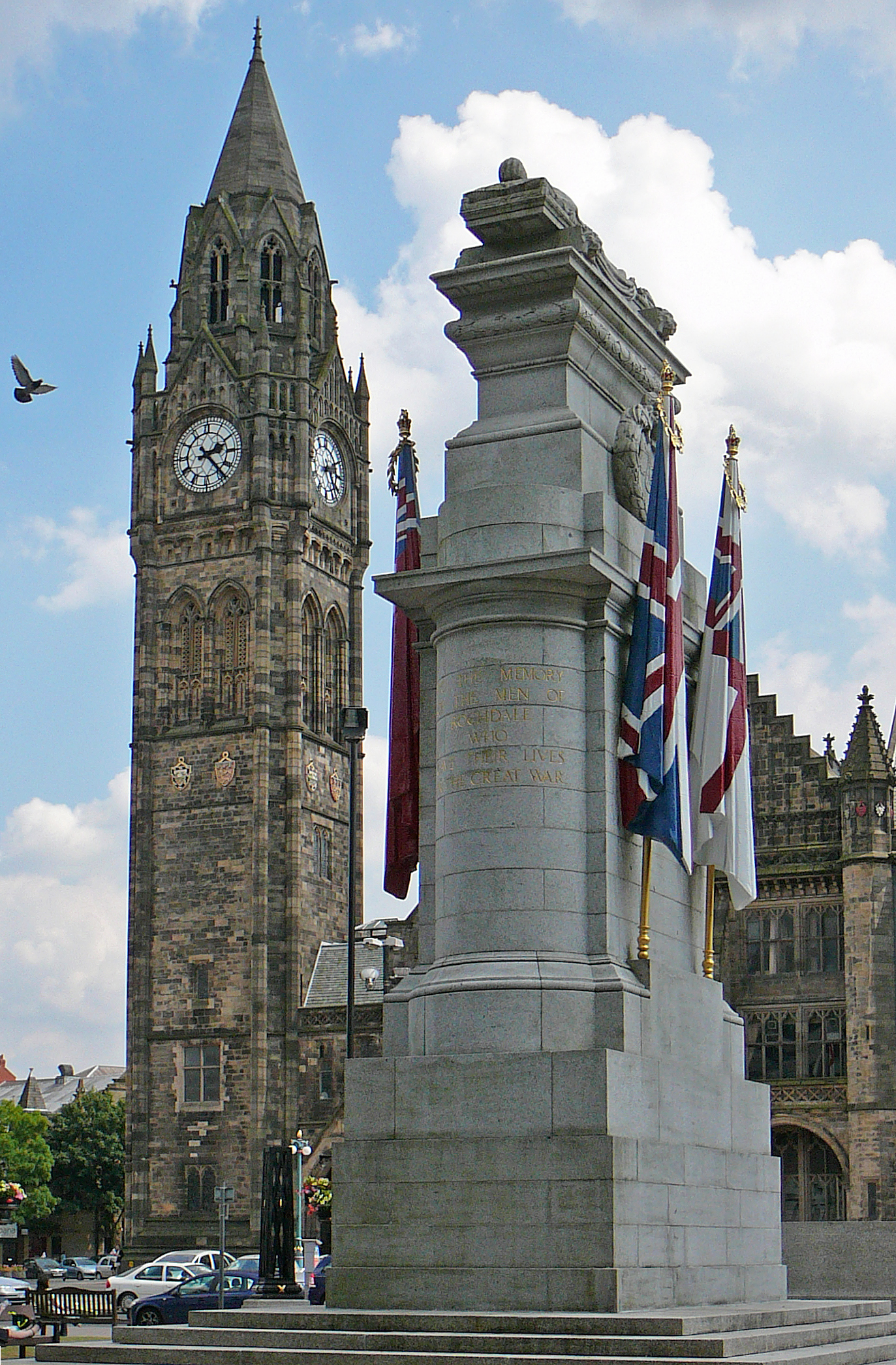
The Cenotaph stands before Rochdale Town Hall.

There are four Grade I listed buildings in the town: the Town Hall, the Cenotaph, the Church of St Mary in the Baum, and St Edmund's Church.

Rochdale Town Hall is a Victorian era town hall "widely recognised as being one of the finest municipal buildings in the country." It is the ceremonial headquarters of Rochdale Metropolitan Borough Council and houses local government departments, including the borough's civil registration office.

Built in the Gothic Revival style, it was inaugurated on 27 September 1871. The architect, William Henry Crossland, won a competition held in 1864. The town hall had a 240-foot (73 m) clock tower, topped by a wooden spire with a gilded statue of Saint George and the Dragon, which were destroyed by fire on 10 April 1883. A new 191-foot (58 m) stone clock tower and spire in the style of Manchester Town Hall was designed by Alfred Waterhouse and erected in 1888. Art critic Nikolaus Pevsner described the building as possessing a "rare picturesque beauty." Its stained glass windows, some designed by William Morris, are credited as "the finest modern examples of their kind." It has been described as one of the United Kingdom's finest examples of Victorian Gothic Revival architecture.

The building came to the attention of Adolf Hitler, who was said to have admired it so much that he wished to ship the building, brick-by-brick, to Nazi Germany had the United Kingdom been defeated in the Second World War.

The Rochdale Cenotaph, a war memorial bearing four sculpted and painted flags, is located opposite the town hall. It commemorates those who died in conflicts since the First World War. The monument and surrounding gardens were designed by Sir Edwin Lutyens. It is one of eight designed by Lutyens in England. The earliest to be erected was at Southampton in 1920; the last at Norwich in 1927. The monument is made from Cornish granite and sits on the site of a building known as Manor House, which was used as a recruiting station during World War I. It was built by Hobson Ltd of Nottingham at a cost of £12,611. It was unveiled by the Earl of Derby on 26 November 1922 and dedicated by the Archdeacon of Rochdale. It is about 10 m (33 ft) tall and the top section is a catafalque, which includes a carving of a horizontal figure.

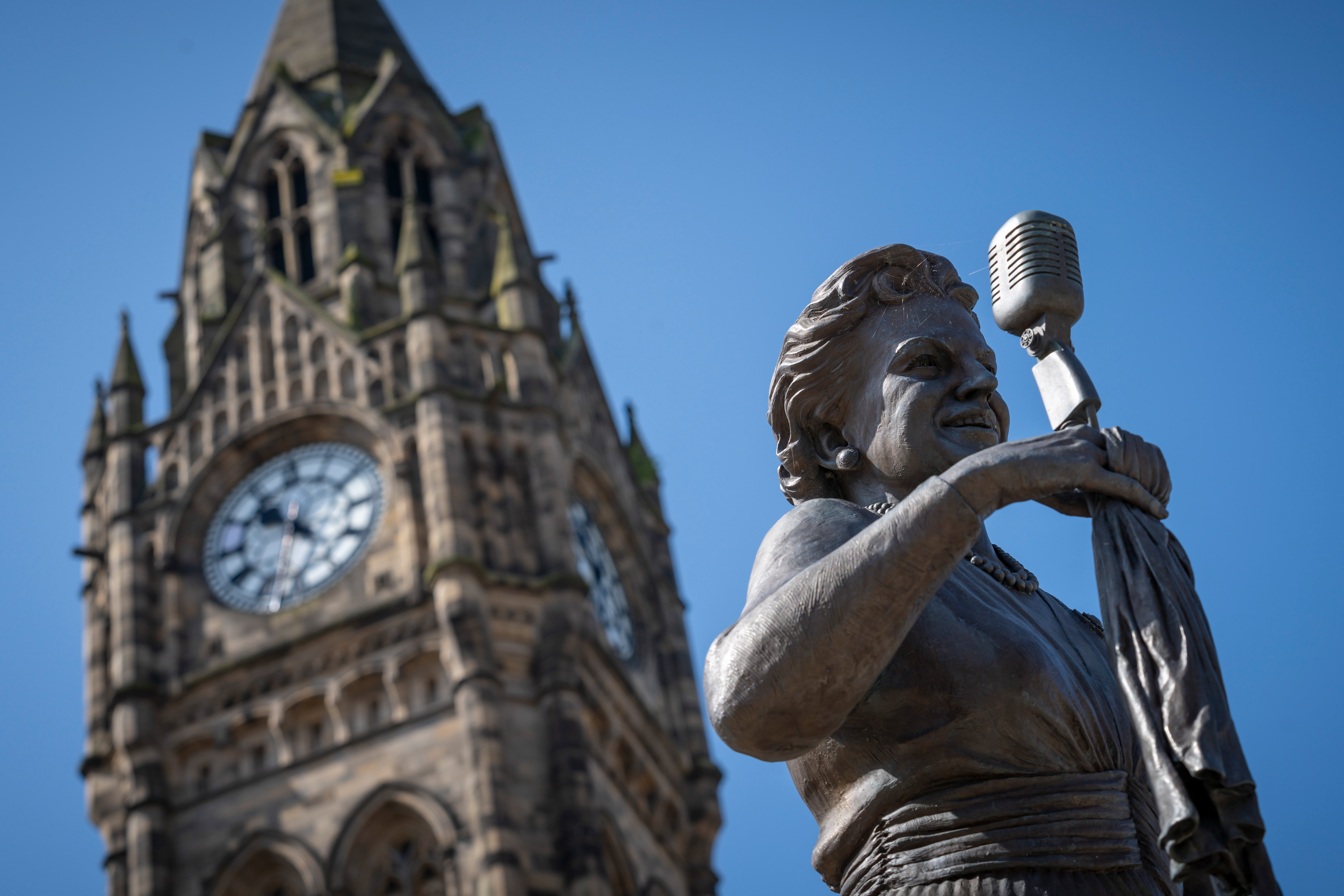
The Dame Gracie Fields statue outside Rochdale Town Hall

Adjacent to the town hall is a statue of the late singer, comedian and actress Dame Gracie Fields. The statue was unveiled by Roy Hudd on 18 September 2016. It was created by sculptor Sean Hedges-Quinn, who based the statue on Fields' look during the 1940s. The statue was the first of a woman to be unveiled in Greater Manchester in more than 100 years. It was commissioned as part of Rochdale Borough Council's wider regeneration of the town centre.

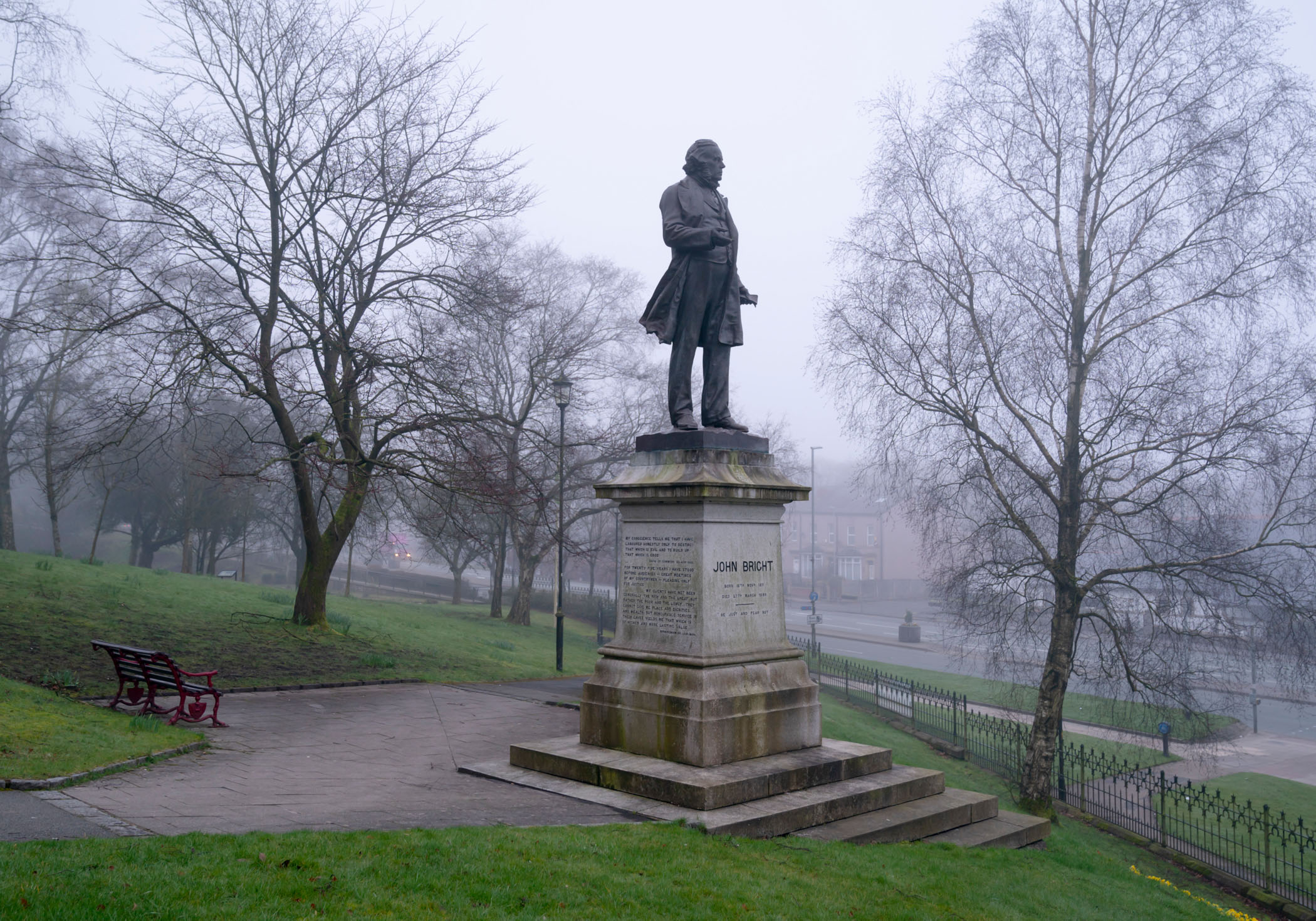
The statue of John Bright MP in Broadfield Park

In Broadfield Park in the town centre, there is a statue of John Bright MP, a British Radical and Liberal statesman, who is regarded as one of the greatest orators of his generation and a promoter of free trade policies. Bright was born in Rochdale; he became famous for his crusade to repeal Britain's corn laws and his promotion of religious freedom and electoral reform.

Worthy of note is a large industrial park, named the Kingsway Business Park, for which planning permission for its construction began in 2009. The complex covers an area of 420 acres (0.66 sq mi; 1.7 km^{2}).

== Transport ==
Public transport in Rochdale is coordinated by Transport for Greater Manchester (TfGM), which owns the bus station and co-ordinates transport services in the area.

=== Railway and Metrolink ===
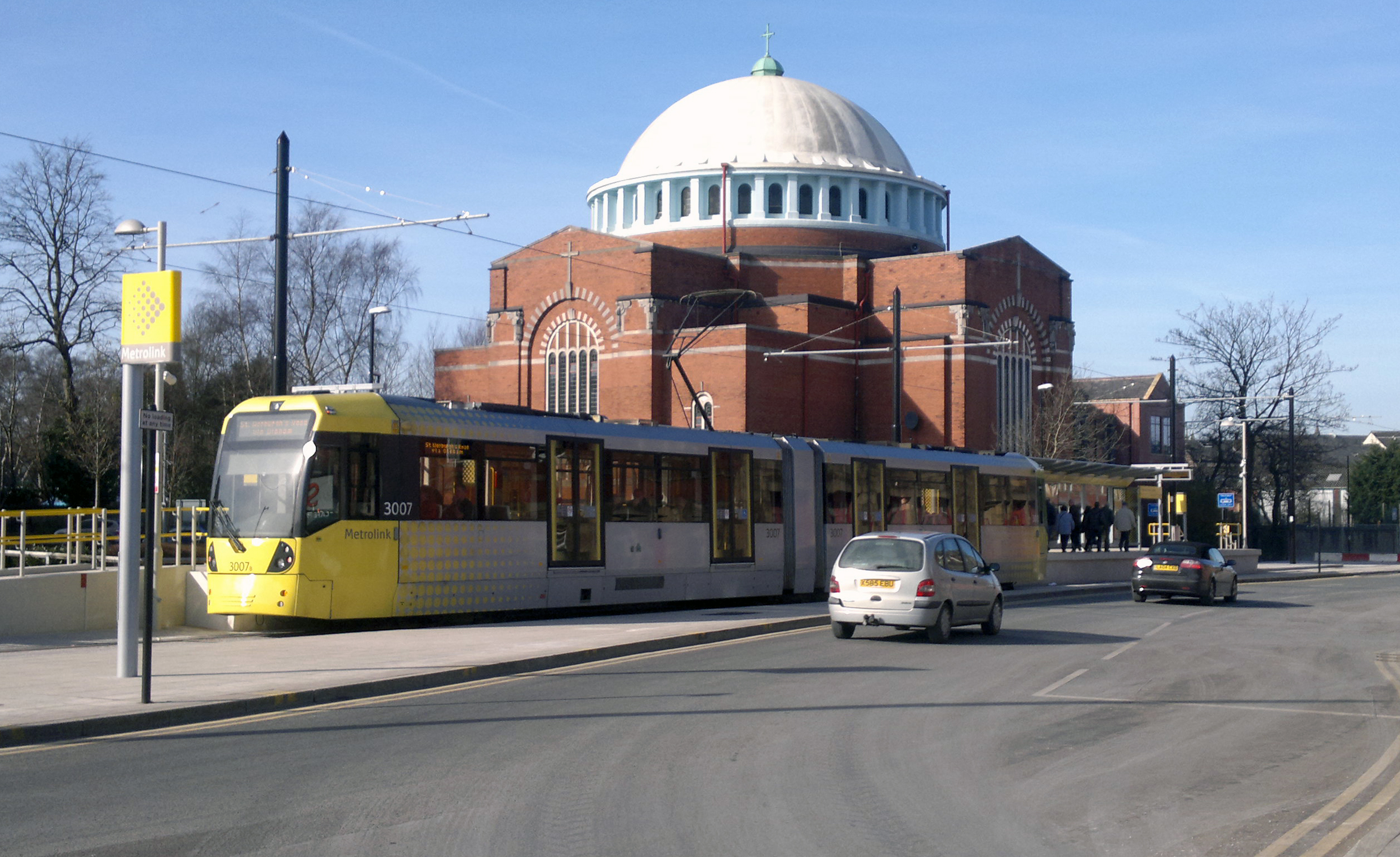
The Metrolink stop at Rochdale railway station

Demand from the cross-Pennine trade to support local cotton, wool and silk industries led to the building of the Manchester and Leeds Railway. It opened in 1839 from Manchester to Littleborough and from Normanton to Hebden Bridge in 1840. The linking section opened on completion of the Summit Tunnel in 1841.

Rochdale railway station is located about a mile south of the town centre. Northern Trains operates services on the following routes:

- Leeds to Manchester Victoria, via Halifax and Bradford Interchange; alternate services extend to Chester
- Leeds to Wigan Wallgate, via Dewsbury, Brighouse and Salford Central
- Blackburn to Headbolt Lane, via Manchester Victoria, Burnley Manchester Road and Accrington.

The stopping service to Manchester Victoria on the Oldham Loop line ended in October 2009, in preparation for conversion of the line to an extension of the Metrolink light rail system. It was deferred in 2004 on grounds of cost but, in July 2006, plans were approved for the extension from Manchester Victoria as far as Rochdale railway station; it opened on 28 February 2013, as the Oldham and Rochdale Line. The extension to Rochdale town centre, via Drake Street and terminating opposite Rochdale Interchange, opened on 31 March 2014.

Metrolink services currently operate to East Didsbury tram stop, via Manchester city centre, on the Pink line.

=== Buses ===
The borough's bus service was provided by a municipal operator, Rochdale Corporation Transport, which was merged into the SELNEC Passenger Transport Executive in 1969.

Following deregulation of bus services across England, Rochdale was host to a number of bus operators. First Manchester (previously GM Buses North) established itself as the dominant company for interurban routes to destinations such as Manchester, Shaw, Oldham, Bury and Bolton. Rossendale Transport (rebranded Rosso in 2013) owned by Rossendale Borough Council between 1986 and 2017 until being sold to Transdev was the largest operator of local bus routes within Rochdale operating brands such as Rochdale Rovers, the 464 and Lakeline.

Rochdale's old bus station closed in November 2013 and was demolished in April 2014, along with the multi-storey car park and municipal offices (known locally as The Black Box), to make way for the new Rochdale Riverside retail and leisure development. Its replacement, Rochdale Interchange, is located next to the council office and main library building Number One Riverside and is linked with Rochdale Town Centre tram stop.

=== Roads ===
The earliest routes around Rochdale were tracks and packhorse routes, with a paved track over Blackstone Edge into Yorkshire that had Roman origins. As trade increased, the Blackstone Edge turnpike road was built in 1735.

The M62 motorway passes to the south of the town and is accessed via the A627(M), which starts at Sandbrook Park in Rochdale and runs to Elk Mill in Chadderton. The A627(M) also provides access to Oldham.

=== Canals ===
The idea for the Rochdale Canal emerged in 1776, when James Brindley was commissioned to survey possible routes between Sowerby Bridge and Manchester.

However, it was not until 4 April 1794 that an Act of Parliament was obtained. The broad canal which linked the Bridgewater Canal in Manchester with the Aire and Calder Navigation at Sowerby Bridge became a major artery of commerce between Lancashire and Yorkshire for cotton, wool, coal, limestone, timber and salt. The Rochdale Canal has the highest concentration of canal locks in the regional northern canal system; it houses 91 locks over 32 miles (51 km).

Hollingworth Lake is part of the canal system. It was originally designed to regulate water levels and was part of the original engineering initiative. By the 1950s, the canal had fallen into general disuse and was abandoned in the 1960s, along with many other industrial areas that had supported traditional industries. The lower section from the Bridgewater Canal to the junction with the Ashton Canal was restored as part of the Cheshire Ring in 1974. The rest of the canal was restored and reopened in 2003. Local activist groups have worked to further improve the canal.

== Education ==
=== Changing Education ===
The structure of secondary education in Rochdale has undergone significant change since the late 20th century. During the 1960s and 1970s, pupils typically progressed through the O‑level and A‑level system, with several schools — offering academically selective streams and broad subject provision.

The national replacement of O‑levels with the General Certificate of Secondary Education (GCSE) in 1986 brought a shift toward comprehensive assessment and standardised curricula, a reform that coincided with the decline or closure of several older schools and a gradual reduction in subject specialisation.

By the early 21st century, Rochdale’s post‑16 landscape had consolidated significantly. Most secondary schools in the borough no longer maintain sixth forms, with A‑level provision now centred on Rochdale Sixth Form College, opened in 2010 as the primary provider of advanced courses for the town and wider borough. This restructuring has resulted in fewer local subject offerings than were available under the former grammar‑school and sixth‑form model, reflecting broader national trends toward centralised further‑education provision.

Hopwood Hall College is a further education college with a campus in Rochdale. It offers vocational courses for school leavers and adult learners, with some higher education.

Rochdale Sixth Form College opened in September 2010; it is the primary provider of A-Level courses in Rochdale and the wider metropolitan borough. Most secondary schools in the area no longer offer sixth form courses.

== Media ==
Local news and television programmes are provided by BBC North West and ITV Granada. Television signals are received from the Winter Hill TV transmitter.

Local radio stations are BBC Radio Manchester, Heart North West, Smooth North West, Greatest Hits Radio Manchester & The North West, Capital Manchester and Lancashire and Rochdale Valley, a community based radio station.

Rochdale is served by a local newspaper, the Rochdale Observer - founded in the early 1850s, and by a regional newspaper, the Manchester Evening News.

== Religion ==
St Chad's Church is a Grade II* listed building. It was the mother church of the ancient parish of Rochdale and was founded before 1170, possibly on an Anglo-Saxon site. Much of the current building is the result of late Victorian restoration. Other Anglican churches include the Grade I listed Church of St Mary in the Baum.

St John the Baptist Catholic Church was built in 1927 in the Byzantine Revival style and is a Grade II* listed building.

Marland Grange was a Cistercian grange of Stanlow, Cheshire, then of Whalley. The grange was founded before 1212.

Rochdale is home to 21 mosques of various denominations. Rochdale Central Masjid [Idara] is the largest of Rochdale's mosques.

== Public services ==
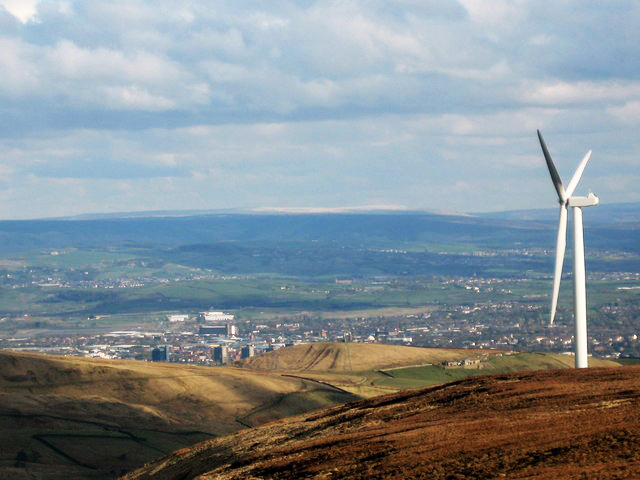
Scout Moor Wind Farm overlooking Rochdale

Home Office policing in Rochdale is provided by Greater Manchester Police and the Rochdale Division has headquarters at Town Meadow, adjacent to the magistrates' court.

Statutory emergency fire and rescue services are provided by the Greater Manchester Fire and Rescue Service, which has fire stations in Rochdale, Littleborough and Heywood.

Emergency healthcare is provided by the Northern Care Alliance. The trust operates four hospitals in the North Manchester area, including Rochdale Infirmary for the NHS. Patient transport is provided by the North West Ambulance Service.

Rochdale Infirmary is the main hospital serving the town since the closure of Birch Hill Hospital, which occupied the former Rochdale Union Workhouse at Dearnley, in 2007. New facilities were established at the infirmary as part of a restructuring of the town's healthcare services. Mental health services are found to the back of the former Birch Hill Hospital, which provides care for children and adults on both an inpatient and out-patient basis.

Primary care services in Rochdale are provided by the Heywood, Middleton and Rochdale NHS Primary Care Trust. In 2006, it was announced that accident and emergency facilities at Rochdale Infirmary would be closed by 2011, leaving Oldham and Bury as the closest departments serving Rochdale. Confirmation that the unit would close was met with protest locally, including a march through the town centre.

Waste management was coordinated by the local authority from 1986, via the Greater Manchester Waste Disposal Authority, and since 1 April 2018 via its representation on the Greater Manchester Combined Authority.

Rochdale's distribution network operator for electricity was United Utilities until 2010, when its electricity subsidiary was sold to Electricity North West. There are no power stations in the town, following the closure of Rochdale power station in 1958. Scout Moor Wind Farm was built on the high moors between Rawtenstall and Rochdale; it has 26 turbines and generates 65MW of electricity.

United Utilities manages Rochdale's drinking and waste water. Water supplies are sourced from several reservoirs in Rochdale's outlying moorland, including Blackstone Edge, Greenbooth, Piethorne, and Watergrove

== Sport ==
Rochdale has two professional teams: Rochdale A.F.C. (football) and Rochdale Hornets (rugby league); both play home games at the Spotland Stadium.

Rochdale AFC were founded in 1907 and joined the Football League in 1921, when the new Football League Third Division (North) was created. The club has never played above the third tier of the English league divisional structure and, before its promotion at the end of the 2009/10 season (their first promotion since 1969), had played continuously in the Football League's lowest division since 1974. However, the club reached the Football League Cup Final in 1962 and lost to Norwich City.

Rochdale Hornets is one of the original twenty-two rugby clubs that formed the Northern Rugby Football Union in 1895, making it one of the world's first rugby league teams.

The town was home to former non-league football club, Rochdale Town, but still hosts National Conference League amateur rugby league club Rochdale Mayfield. Rochdale R.U.F.C. who play in Bamford. There are two adult amateur football leagues: the Rochdale Online Alliance League and the Rochdale and District Sunday Football League.

Golf courses around the town include Rochdale Golf Club and Marland Golf Course, at Springfield Park. The town also has a number of cricket clubs, most of which play in the Pennine Cricket League (PCL). Rochdale Sub-Aqua Club was formed in 1959 and remains active.

Speedway racing was staged at the Athletic Grounds in 1928–30 and returned at the start of the 1970s when it provided a home for the British League Division Two Belle Vue Aces juniors and Rochdale Hornets. Peter Collins, who won the 1976 World Championship, was a Hornets rider. Stuart Smith and Doug Cronshaw competed in BriSCA Formula 1 Stock Cars between 1965 and 1984.

== Twin towns – sister cities ==
- Bielefeld, North Rhine-Westphalia, Germany (since 1953)
- Lviv, Lviv Oblast, Ukraine (1992)
- Sahiwal, Punjab, Pakistan (1998)
- Tourcoing, Nord, Hauts-de-France, France (1956)

Sahiwal council has received many gifts, such as fire brigade trucks, ambulances and grants for hospitals from the people of Rochdale.

Rochdale also maintains friendship links with Avellino, Italy, Kabarnet, Kenya and Riga, Latvia.

== Notable people ==
Lancashire dialect poet Edwin Waugh (1817–1890) was born and brought up in the town.

The aristocrat and poet George Gordon Byron was Lord Byron of Rochdale. Rochdale has a proud liberal political heritage, as shown by such people as John Bright, one of the first Quakers to sit in the House of Commons, and Rev. Joseph Cooke, the inspiration behind the Methodist Unitarian movement. In the 20th century, another prominent political personality was Cyril Smith, who was posthumously found to have sexually abused children.

Among Rochdale's residents have been several musicians, including singers Gracie Fields, Lisa Stansfield (born in Heywood), Barb Jungr, and Piri, and bands Kaliphz also known as Kaleef, Autechre, and Tractor.

Broadcasters John Peel and Mark Chapman also have links with the town; Peel lived there for a period of time and Chapman was born there. Actors Anna Friel, Bill Oddie and Christine Bottomley were born in Rochdale. Don Estelle, who was born and brought up in Crumpsall, lived for much of his life in Rochdale, including in the Seven Sisters tower blocks that overlook the town centre, and was buried there in August 2003.

Sajid Javid, the former Chancellor of the Exchequer was born in Rochdale to British Pakistani parents.

Other notable residents include businessman and philanthropist Sir Peter Ogden, novelist Nicholas Blincoe, Monica Coghlan, a prostitute caught up in the Jeffrey Archer scandal, and the banker Rev. Paul Flowers.

Novelist Anna Jacobs was born in Rochdale. World Series of poker winner Jake Cody grew up in Rochdale.

The footballer Earl Barrett was born there in April 1967 to Jamaican immigrant parents. Great Britain Olympian Craig Dawson, represented hometown club Rochdale and Bolton Wanderers at football. England national team player and Great Britain Olympian Keira Walsh who previously has played for Blackburn Rovers, Manchester City, Barcelona, and current team Chelsea. A mural depicting Walsh playing for the Lionesses was completed in June 2024.

== See also ==
- Listed buildings in Rochdale
