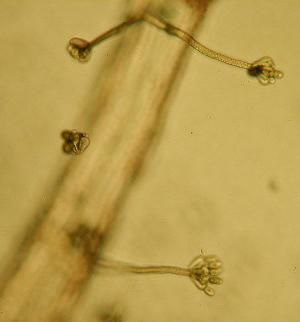
- Conidiophores of Stachybotrys chartarum with clusters of phlialides

Scientific classification
- Kingdom: Fungi
- Division: Ascomycota
- Class: Sordariomycetes
- Order: Hypocreales
- Family: Stachybotryaceae
- Genus: Stachybotrys; Corda (1837)

Type species
- Stachybotrys atrus Corda (1837)

Species
- ~ 50, see text

Synonyms
- Synsporium Preuss (1849); Fuckelina Sacc. (1875); Gliobotrys Höhn. (1902); Hyalobotrys Pidopl. (1948); Hyalostachybotrys Sriniv. (1958); Ornatispora K.D.Hyde (1999)

= Stachybotrys =

Genus of fungi

Stachybotrys (/ˌstækiˈbɒtrɪs/) is a genus of molds, hyphomycetes or asexually reproducing, filamentous fungi, now placed in the family Stachybotryaceae. The genus was erected by August Carl Joseph Corda in 1837. Historically, it was considered closely related to the genus Memnoniella, because the spores are produced in slimy heads rather than in dry chains. Recently, the synonymy of the two genera is generally accepted. Most Stachybotrys species inhabit materials rich in cellulose. The genus has a widespread distribution and contained about 50 species in 2008. There are 88 records of Stachybotrys on Species Fungorum (in 2023), of which 33 species have DNA sequence data in GenBank. Species in the genus are commonly found in soil, plant litter (hay, straw, cereal grains, and decaying plant debris) and air and a few species have been found from damp paper, cotton, linen, cellulose-based building materials water-damaged indoor buildings, and air ducts from both aquatic and terrestrial habitats (Izabel et al. 2010; Lombard et al. 2016; Hyde et al. 2020a).

The name of Stachybotrys is derived from the Greek words σταχυς stakhus ('ear of grain, stalk, stick'; metaphorically, 'progeny') and βότρυς botrus ('cluster' or 'bunch' as in grapes, 'trusses').

The most infamous species, Stachybotrys chartarum (previously known as Stachybotrys atra) and Stachybotrys chlorohalonata, are known as black mold or toxic black mold in the U.S., and are frequently associated with poor indoor air quality that arises after fungal growth on water-damaged building materials. Stachybotrys chemotypes are toxic, with one producing trichothecene mycotoxins including satratoxins, and another that produces atranones. However, the association of Stachybotrys mold with specific health conditions is not well proven and there exists a debate within the scientific community.

== Conidia ==
Conidia are in slimy masses, smooth to coarsely rough, dark olivaceous to brownish black, obovoid, later becoming ellipsoid with age, 10–13 × 5–7 mm. Phialides are obovate or ellipsoidal, colorless early then turning to olivaceous with maturity, smooth, 12–14 × 5–7 mm, in clusters of 5 to 9 phialides. Conidiophores are simple, erect, smooth to rough, colorless to olivaceous, slightly enlarged apically, mostly unbranched but occasionally branched. Conidia of Stachybotrys are very characteristic and can be confidently identified in spore count samples. This genus is closely related to Memnoniella. Species of Memnoniella may occasionally develop Stachybotrys-like conidia, and vice versa.

== Detection ==
Four distinctive microbial volatile organic compounds (MVOCs) – 1-butanol, 3-methyl-1-butanol, 3-methyl-2-butanol, and thujopsene – were detected on rice cultures, and only one (1-butanol) was detected on gypsum board cultures.

== Pathogenicity ==
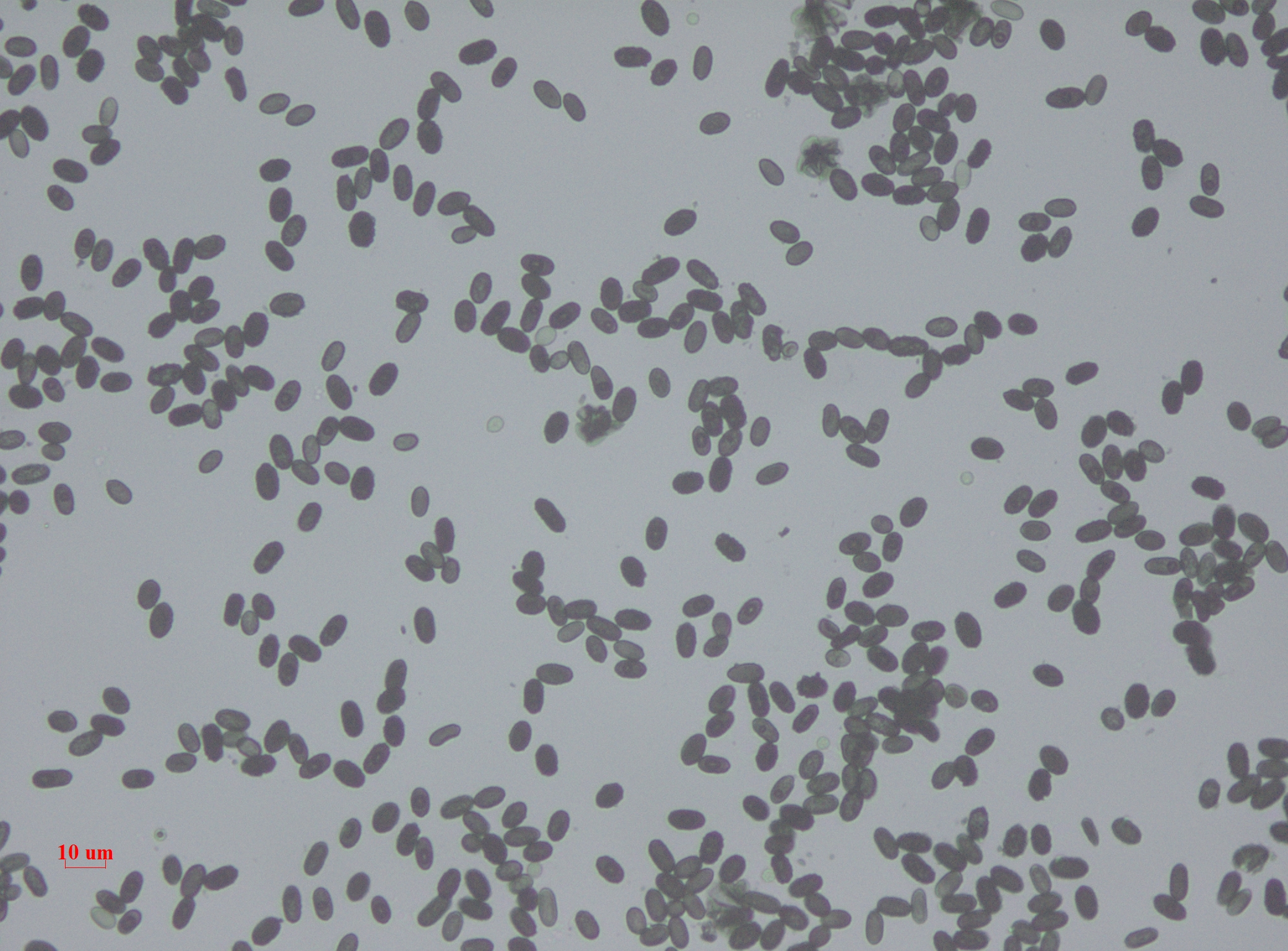
Stachybotrys spores 10 × 40 magnification under bright field microscopy

=== Symptoms of Stachybotrys exposure in humans ===
A controversy began in the early 1990s after analysis of two infant deaths and multiple cases in children from impoverished areas of Cleveland, Ohio, United States, due to pulmonary hemorrhage were initially linked to exposure to large amounts of Stachybotrys chartarum. Subsequent and extensive reanalysis of the cases by the United States Centers for Disease Control and Prevention have failed to find any link between the deaths and the mold exposure.

== Species ==
As accepted by Species Fungorum (as of July 2023);

- Stachybotrys aksuensis J.H. Kong & T.Y. Zhang (2014)
- Stachybotrys aloicola L. Lombard & Crous (2014)
- Stachybotrys alternans Bonord. (1851)
- Stachybotrys aurantius G.L. Barron (1962)
- Stachybotrys bambusicola Rifai (1964)
- Stachybotrys biformis J.H. Kong & T.Y. Zhang (2014)
- Stachybotrys bisbyi (Sriniv.) G.L. Barron (1964)
- Stachybotrys breviuscula McKenzie (1991)
- Stachybotrys chartarum (Ehrenb.) S. Hughes (1958)
- Stachybotrys chlorohalonatus B. Andersen & Thrane (2003)
- Stachybotrys clitoriae Bat. & Peres (1960)
- Stachybotrys cordylines McKenzie (2004)
- Stachybotrys cylindrospora C.N. Jensen (1912)
- Stachybotrys dakotensis Sacc. (1917)
- Stachybotrys dolichophialis L. Lombard & Crous (2016)
- Stachybotrys echinatus (Rivolta) G. Sm. (1962)
- Stachybotrys elasticae Koord. (1907)
- Stachybotrys freycinetiae McKenzie (1991)
- Stachybotrys frondicola (K.D. Hyde, Goh, Joanne E. Taylor & J. Fröhl.) Yong Wang bis, K.D. Hyde, McKenzie, Y.L. Jiang & D.W. Li (2015)
- Stachybotrys gamsii (K.D. Hyde, Goh, Joanne E. Taylor & J. Fröhl.) Yong Wang bis, K.D. Hyde, McKenzie, Y.L. Jiang & D.W. Li (2015)
- Stachybotrys globosus P.C. Misra & S.K. Srivast. (1982)
- Stachybotrys guttulisporus Muhsin & Al-Helfi (1981)
- Stachybotrys havanensis Mercado & J. Mena (1988)
- Stachybotrys humilis Krzemien. & Badura (1954)
- Stachybotrys indicoides Yong Wang bis, K.D. Hyde, McKenzie, Y.L. Jiang & D.W. Li (2015)
- Stachybotrys indicus P.C. Misra (1975)
- Stachybotrys jiangziensis Y.M. Wu & T.Y. Zhang (2011)
- Stachybotrys kampalensis Hansf. (1943)
- Stachybotrys kapiti Whitton, McKenzie & K.D. Hyde (2001)
- Stachybotrys klebahnii G. Burchard (1930)
- Stachybotrys leprosus (R.F. Castañeda) R.F. Castañeda (2015)
- Stachybotrys levisporus (Subram.) Yong Wang bis, K.D. Hyde, McKenzie, Y.L. Jiang & D.W. Li (2015)
- Stachybotrys limonisporus L. Lombard & Crous (2016)
- Stachybotrys littoralis J.J. Xu, Y.L. Zhang & T.Y. Zhang (2014)
- Stachybotrys longistipitatus (D.W. Li, Chin S. Yang, Vesper & Haugland) D.W. Li, Chin S. Yang, Vesper & Haugland (2015)
- Stachybotrys lunzinensis Svilv. (1941)
- Stachybotrys mangiferae P.C. Misra & S.K. Srivast. (1982)
- Stachybotrys mexicanus J. Mena & Heredia (2009); Stachybotryaceae
- Stachybotrys microspora (B.L. Mathur & Sankhla) S.C. Jong & E.E. Davis (1976)
- Stachybotrys mohanramii (Manohar., D.K. Agarwal, Kunwar, Sureshk. & Sharath) Yong Wang bis, K.D. Hyde, McKenzie, Y.L. Jiang & D.W. Li (2015)
- Stachybotrys musae B.C. Samar. & Chomnunti (2021)
- Stachybotrys nepalensis (Whitton, K.D. Hyde & McKenzie) Whitton, McKenzie & K.D. Hyde (2015)
- Stachybotrys nephrodes McKenzie (1991)
- Stachybotrys nephrospora Hansf. (1943)
- Stachybotrys nielamuensis Y.M. Wu & T.Y. Zhang (2009)
- Stachybotrys oenanthes M.B. Ellis (1971)
- Stachybotrys pallescens Y.L. Jiang & T.Y. Zhang (2009)
- Stachybotrys pallidus Orpurt (1954)
- Stachybotrys palmae Pinruan (2004)
- Stachybotrys palmicola (K.D. Hyde, Goh, Joanne E. Taylor & J. Fröhl.) Yong Wang bis, K.D. Hyde, McKenzie, Y.L. Jiang & D.W. Li (2015)
- Stachybotrys palmijunci Rifai (1974)
- Stachybotrys parvisporus S. Hughes (1952)
- Stachybotrys parvus R.S. Dwivedi & B.P. Singh (1969)
- Stachybotrys proliferatus K.G. Karand., S.M. Kulk. & Patw. (1992)
- Stachybotrys punctatus (Dulym., P.F. Cannon, K.D. Hyde & Peerally) Yong Wang bis, K.D. Hyde, McKenzie, Y.L. Jiang & D.W. Li (2015)
- Stachybotrys queenslandicus Matsush. (1989)
- Stachybotrys ramosus Dorai & Vittal (1987)
- Stachybotrys reniformis Tubaki (1963)
- Stachybotrys renisporoides K.G. Karand., S.M. Kulk. & Patw. (1992)
- Stachybotrys renisporus P.C. Misra (1976)
- Stachybotrys reniverrucosus Whitton, McKenzie & K.D. Hyde (2001)
- Stachybotrys ruwenzoriensis Matsush. (1985)
- Stachybotrys sacchari (Sriniv.) G.L. Barron (1964)
- Stachybotrys sansevieriae G.P. Agarwal & N.D. Sharma (1974)
- Stachybotrys sinuatophorus Matsush. (1971)
- Stachybotrys socia (Sacc.) Sacc. (1909)
- Stachybotrys sphaerosporus Morgan-Jones & R.C. Sinclair (1980)
- Stachybotrys stilboideus Munjal & J.N. Kapoor (1969)
- Stachybotrys subcylindrosporus C.Y. Jie, Y.L. Jiang, D.W. Li, McKenzie & Yong Wang bis (2012)
- Stachybotrys subreniformis Q.R. Li & Y.L. Jiang (2011)
- Stachybotrys subsylvaticus L. Lombard & Crous (2016)
- Stachybotrys suthepensis Photita, P. Lumyong, K.D. Hyde & McKenzie (2003)
- Stachybotrys taiwanensis (Sivan. & W.H. Hsieh) Yong Wang bis, K.D. Hyde, McKenzie, Y.L. Jiang & D.W. Li (2015)
- Stachybotrys terrestris J.H. Kong & T.Y. Zhang (2007)
- Stachybotrys thaxteri D.W. Li (2011)
- Stachybotrys theobromae Hansf. (1943)
- Stachybotrys variabilis H.F. Wang & T.Y. Zhang (2009)
- Stachybotrys verrucisporus Matsush. (1985)
- Stachybotrys verrucosus Cooke & Massee (1888)
- Stachybotrys virgatus Krzemien. & Badura (1954)
- Stachybotrys voglinoi Cif. (1922)
- Stachybotrys waitakere Whitton, McKenzie & K.D. Hyde (2001)
- Stachybotrys xanthosomatis Mercado & J. Mena (1988)
- Stachybotrys xigazenensis Y.M. Wu & T.Y. Zhang (2011)
- Stachybotrys yunnanensis H.Z. Kong (1997)
- Stachybotrys yushuensis H.Q. Pan & T.Y. Zhang (2014)
- Stachybotrys zeae Morgan-Jones & Karr (1976)
- Stachybotrys zhangmuensis Y.M. Wu & T.Y. Zhang (2009)
- Stachybotrys zingiberis (V.G. Rao) Yong Wang bis, K.D. Hyde, McKenzie, Y.L. Jiang & D.W. Li (2015)
- Stachybotrys zuckii K. Matsush. & Matsush. (1995)

== See also ==
- Bioaerosol
- Mold growth, assessment, and remediation
- Mold health issues
- Sick building syndrome
