= Hartmann F. Stähelin =

Swiss pharmacologist (1925–2011)

Hartmann F. Stähelin (20 October 1925 – 5 July 2011) was a Swiss pharmacologist with an outstanding record in basic and applied cancer and immunology research. He discovered two important drugs: etoposide and ciclosporin.

== Early life ==
Both Stähelin's parents were medical doctors. After preparatory school and a classical education with the emphasis on Greek and Latin, Stähelin studied medicine in Basel, Zürich and Florence (1944–1950). His first position after graduation was at the Institute of Microbiology of the University of Basel (1951–1954) where he investigated the morphology and sporulation of anthrax bacilli with the help of the then-new phase-contrast microscope. In May 1951, Stähelin was the first to observe naked anthrax bacilli protoplasts, called gymnoplasts, which had left behind their empty cell walls. A year later, during his studies of their osmotic behavior, he discovered and described the occasional fusion of naked protoplasts. This seminal paper in German immediately caught the attention of the bacterial geneticist Joshua Lederberg, who personally requested a copy.

== Early career ==
In 1954, Stähelin successfully applied for a 12-month postdoctoral fellowship sponsored by the Swiss National Foundation (SNF) to work on a project on phagocytosis inspired by Emanuel Suter (then at Harvard, later second Dean of the University of Florida Medical School). In 1955, Stähelin rediscovered the respiratory burst in leucocytes in Manfred L. Karnovsky's laboratory at the Department of Bacteriology and Immunology, Harvard Medical School, Boston, U.S.A. His experiments stirred the interest of Karnovsky, who was at the time unaware of this metabolic phenomenon (which had first been described more than twenty years earlier in 1933 by C. W. Baldridge and R. W. Gerard). Stähelin's elegant work subsequently paved the way for the famous investigations of A.J. Sbarra and Karnovsky on the role of oxygen in the defense against microorganisms.

While at Boston, the biomedical talent of the 27-year-old Stähelin was spotted by the director of the pharmacology department of the Sandoz Corp. (now Novartis AG.) Basel, who visited Suter's Harvard Medical School laboratory. After 6 months of training in the state-of-the art tissue-culture techniques in John F. Enders' laboratory in Boston, sponsored by Sandoz, Stähelin joined its pharmacology department in Basel to head the newly created laboratory, then a research group working on cancer and immunology (1955–1979).

== Discovery of Podophyllum derivatives ==
Stähelin quickly assumed the leading role in the discovery and development of Podophyllum compounds; four of them, including etoposide (Vepesid), were later marketed. He was able to detect in a partially purified, chemically modified extract of the Podophyllum plant the presence of a then-unknown agent with interesting properties, which had at first been considered by the chemists to be "dirt". The chemists, under the direction of A. von Wartburg, analysed this impurity. Guided by Stähelin's in-vitro and in-vivo assays, they found the active compound responsible for the good antitumor activity of SP-G (Proresid oral) and SP-I (Proresid intravenous; discovered in April 1959, commercialized 1963). Further chemical modifications led to the well-known thenylidene derivative VM-26 (teniposide, Vumon, discovered in October 1965, commercialized by Sandoz in 1976) and to the ethylidene derivative VP-16-213 (etoposide, Vepesid, discovered on 21 October 1966), which remains very clinically successful.

Teniposide and etoposide were found by Stähelin to have a new mechanism of action: they blocked the entry of cells into mitosis (with arrest in late S or G2 phase), in contrast to SP-G and SP-I, which were spindle poisons. His subsequent investigations showed that the early biochemical effect of the two epipodophyllotoxins on proliferating cells in vitro differed from that of the alkylating agents, antimetabolites and Vinca alkaloids. After a landmark clinical comparative analysis by F. Muggia and M. Rozencweig, etoposide and teniposide were licensed to Bristol-Myers in 1978 for further clinical development. A few years later, in November 1983, etoposide was approved by the U.S. Food and Drug Administration.

Etoposide is used as a potent, well-tolerated combination partner in innumerable hematologic and solid tumor treatment schedules to this day, including those for malignant lymphomas and lung cancer. It is also indispensable in the cure of testicular carcinoma.

== New screening process and the discovery of immunosuppressants ==
Stähelin was also instrumental in the discovery process of several microbial products inhibiting cell proliferation, including cytochalasin B, brefeldin A, verrucarin A, anguinine and chlamydocin, which have played an important role in basic cancer research.

In 1969, Stähelin made the key decision to include a test system for immunosuppression into the general screening program at Sandoz for compounds and extracts. He invented a new procedure which permitted the use of the same mice for testing both anticancer activity (L-1210) and immunosuppression (inhibition of antibody formation) in an "all in one in-vivo test system". This considerably reduced both the number of experimental animals and the quantity of test substances required, and also decreased the labour involved. Stähelin's invention of this procedure initiated an innovative screening system for discovering immunosuppressant drugs lacking bone marrow toxicity – the first such screen to be discovered. This screening process was first used in the pharmacology department in January 1970, before Jean F. Borel joined Stähelin's group.

Stähelin had used a similar screen to discover the nonmyelotoxic immunosuppressant ovalicin. Applying the revised screen led to the discovery of the potent biological activity of ciclosporin on 31 January 1972. This drug was to revolutionize organ transplantation in the 1970s and the paper became a citation classic (CC/6:16-16, 6 February 1984).

The "Stähelin Screen" was rapidly and very successfully adopted by the Japanese pharmaceutical company Fujisawa (now Astellas), which subsequently discovered tacrolimus (FK-506, Prograf), the second clinically used calcineurin inhibitor.

On receiving the American Association for Cancer Research Bruce F. Cain Award jointly with his colleague A. von Wartburg in 1990, Stähelin wrote:

"...there are an astonishing number of coincidences between etoposide and cyclosporine. The first coincidence was that etoposide and cyclosporine were both found and developed on the chemical and biological side by the same groups, those of the present authors and their specific biological effects were discovered by one of us; second, both compounds were approved by the United States Food and Drug Administration on the same day in November 1983, although they had been submitted by different companies; furthermore, both drugs act via an effect on an intranuclear isomerase, topoisomerase II, and peptide cis-trans-isomerase, respectively; both compounds are potent immunosuppressants; etoposide as well as cyclosporine are used in the treatment of leukemias or other malignancies; the latter after bone marrow transplantation to prevent graft-versus-host disease, the former also being used in conjunction with bone marrow transplantation; sometimes, the two compounds are used concomitantly, exploiting the capacity of cyclosporine to reduce certain types of multidrug resistance or to modify immunity against tumors cured by etoposide; in the development of both drugs, galenical problems arose, related to poor water solubility and absorption from intestinal tract, and experience gained with etoposide in this area was crucial for overcoming, several years later, difficulties of a similar type with cyclosporine. It is left to the reader to make assumptions about the heuristic aspects of these surprising coincidences..."

== Personal and later life ==
Married to a distant cousin (Irene Staehelin, who is also a member of an old Basel family dating back to 1520) and the father of four adult children, Stähelin retired in 1990. He still occasionally wrote about his discoveries.
