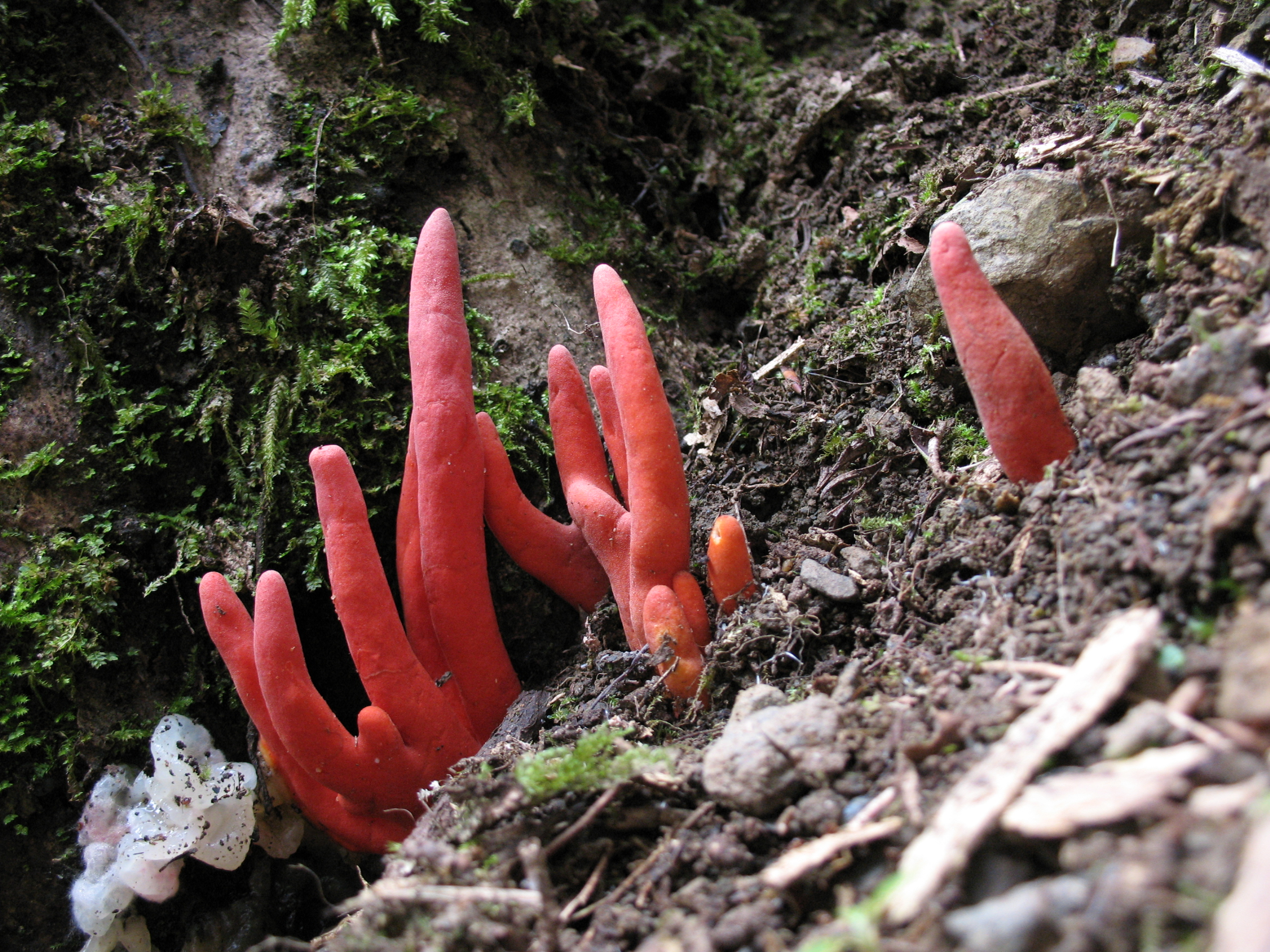

Scientific classification
- Kingdom: Fungi
- Division: Ascomycota
- Class: Sordariomycetes
- Order: Hypocreales
- Family: Hypocreaceae
- Genus: Trichoderma
- Species: T. cornu-damae

Binomial name
- Trichoderma cornu-damae (Pat.) Z.X.Zhu & W.Y.Zhuang (2014)

Synonyms
- Hypocrea cornu-damae Pat. (1895); Podocrea cornu-damae (Pat.) Sacc. & D.Sacc. (1905); Podostroma cornu-damae (Pat.) Boedijn (1934); Protocrea cornu-damae (Pat.) Sacc. & D.Sacc. (1905)

= Trichoderma cornu-damae =

Species of fungus

Trichoderma cornu-damae
- Mycological characteristics
- Smooth hymenium
- No distinct cap
- Hymenium attachment is irregular or not applicable
- Stipe is bare
- Spore print is yellow to brown
- Ecology is saprotrophic
- Edibility is deadly

Trichoderma cornu-damae (Japanese: カエンタケ, Hepburn: kaentake), formerly Podostroma cornu-damae and also known as the poison fire coral, is a species of fungus in the family Hypocreaceae. The fruit bodies of the fungus are highly toxic if ingested, and have been responsible for several human fatalities as they contain an often fatal dose of the macrocyclic terpenoid mycotoxin satratoxin-H.

== Taxonomy ==
The species was originally described as Hypocrea cornu-damae by Narcisse Théophile Patouillard in 1895, and later transferred to the genus Podocrea in 1905 by Pier Andrea Saccardo. In 1994, Japanese mycologists Tsuguo Hongo and Masana Izawa placed the species in the genus Podostroma.

== Range ==
The fungus was once thought to be exclusive to mountainous areas within South Korea and Japan, but recent discoveries have been made in Indonesia, Papua New Guinea, Thailand and Australia.

== Description ==
The conidiophores (specialized fungal hyphae that produce conidia) are up to 400 μm high and about 2–4 μm wide in the main axial hyphae. The phialides are arranged in tufts with narrow angles at the top, similar to the branching hyphae found in other Trichoderma species. The conidia are roughly spherical with a truncate base in each spore, pale green in color, and measure 2.5–3.5 μm in diameter. Their surfaces are almost smooth, but sometimes appearing very faintly roughened with light microscopy.

== Toxicity ==
Chemical structure of Satratoxin H

Several poisonings have been reported in Japan resulting from the consumption of the fungus. In 1999, one of a group of five people from Niigata Prefecture died two days after consuming one or two grams of fruit body that had been soaked in sake. In 2000, an individual from Gunma Prefecture died after eating the fried mushroom. Symptoms associated with consumption in these cases include gastroenteritis, hemophagocytosis, leukocytopenia, thrombocytopenia, peeling skin on the face and hands, scalp hair loss, and damage to the cerebellum resulting in speech impediment and problems with voluntary movement. In another instance, an autopsy revealed acute kidney and liver damage with associated disseminated intravascular coagulation. In one case of poisoning, the patient suffered from hemophagocytosis, in addition to severe leukocytopenia and thrombocytopenia, seven days after ingesting the fungus. Plasmapheresis and administration of granulocyte colony-stimulating factor were used to treat the blood abnormalities. The authors suggested that these treatments, in addition to the large volume of administered intravenous saline—9 liters (2.0 imp gal; 2.4 U.S. gal) over a 12-hour period—were responsible for his successful recovery.

Human poisoning symptoms are similar to those observed previously with livestock that had consumed trichothecene mycotoxins. Japanese researchers detected the presence of the macrocyclic trichothecenes satratoxin H, satratoxin H 12′,13′-diacetate, satratoxin H 12′-acetate, and satratoxin H 13′-acetate. When grown in liquid culture the fungus additionally produces roridin E and verrucarin J. With the exception of verrucarin J, a 500 microgram (1/2 milligram) dose of any of these compounds, when injected into the abdomen of mice, will result in their death the following day.

There are unverified claims that touching this fungus will cause an uncomfortable rash or chemical burns.

== See also ==
- List of deadly mushroom species
- List of poisonous mushroom species
- Mycotoxicology
- Trichothecene
