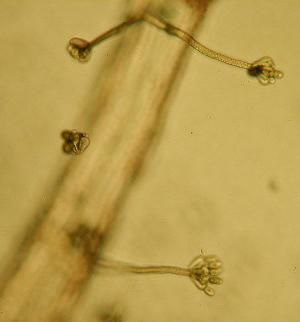

Scientific classification
- Kingdom: Fungi
- Division: Ascomycota
- Class: Sordariomycetes
- Order: Hypocreales
- Family: Stachybotryaceae
- Genus: Stachybotrys
- Species: S. chartarum

Binomial name
- Stachybotrys chartarum (Ehrenb.) S.Hughes (1958)

Synonyms
- List: Stilbospora chartarum Ehrenb. (1818); Oospora chartarum (Ehrenb.) Wallr. (1833); Stachybotrys atrus Corda (1837); Sporocybe lobulata Berk. (1841); Stachybotrys lobulatus (Berk.) Berk. (1860); Stachybotrys scaber Cooke & Harkn. (1884); Stachybotrys atrogriseus Ellis & Everh. (1888); Stachybotrys atrus f. lobulatus Verona (1939); Stachybotrys atrus var. brevicaulis Verona (1939); Stachybotrys lobulatus var. angustisporus M.Moreau & Moreau (1941); Stachybotrys lobulatus var. macrus Pidopl. (1953)

= Stachybotrys chartarum =

Species of fungus

Stachybotrys chartarum (/ˌstækɪˈbɒtrɪs tʃɑːrˈtɛərəm/ STAK-ih-BOT-ris char-TAIR-əm), commonly named black mold, is a species of fungus that produces conidia.

== Taxonomy ==
The fungus was originally described scientifically in 1818 by Christian Gottfried Ehrenberg as a member of the genus Stilbospora. His diagnosis emphasized the form of the spores, which he described as minute, sub-opaque, ovate, and agglomerated into subconcentric, water-soluble irregular clusters. He noted that the fungus adheres to paper, sometimes forming circles dotted with black. Stanley Hughes transferred the taxon to Stachybotrys in 1958. This genus was circumscribed in 1832 by Czech mycologist August Carl Joseph Corda, with Stachybotrys atra assigned as its type species. The species concept of Stachybotrys chartarum has been controversial, as several studies showed that there were several closely related species and cryptic species all under this name.

There are two chemotypes known of S. chartarum, one that produces satratoxin H and one that produces atranones.

== Habitat ==
S. chartarum is a slow-growing mold that does not compete well with other molds. It is only rarely found in nature, sometimes being found in soil and grain, but is most often detected in cellulose-rich building materials, such as gypsum-based drywall and wallpaper from damp or water-damaged buildings. It occasionally encounters human habitats with large amounts of cellulose, large temperature fluctuations, low nitrogen, no other molds, no sunlight, and ample constant humidity. The spores are released into the air when the mold is mechanically disturbed, particularly when dry. It is considered an uncommon contaminant of most indoor air.

== Potential toxicity ==
Claims of health problems in humans and animals related to this mold have been made since the 1930s. More recently, S. chartarum has been linked with so-called sick building syndrome. However, the link has not been firmly established in the scientific literature.

In 1994 the US Centers for Disease Control (CDC) asserted that a number of infants in Cleveland, Ohio became sick, and some died from acute idiopathic pulmonary hemosiderosis (AIPH) following exposure to unusually high levels of S. chartarum spores. A subsequent review done by the CDC found the previous investigation incorrectly analyzed data, and there was no evidence directly linking S. chartarum to AIPH. This was further supported by a lack of S. chartarum in a similar cluster of infant AIPH that occurred in Chicago, Illinois.

== See also ==
- Bioaerosol
- Mold growth, assessment, and remediation
- Mold health issues
