= Mildew =

Form of fungus

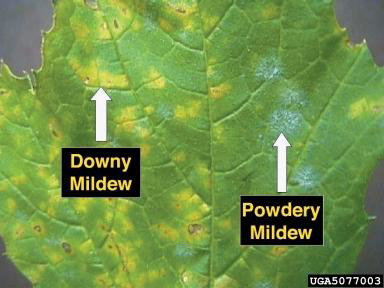
Example of downy mildew (left) along with powdery mildew (right) on a grape leaf

Mildew is a coating of fungal or oomycete growth on plants or other surfaces. It is distinguished from the closely related mould largely by its colour: moulds appear in shades of black, blue, red, and green, whereas mildew is white. It appears as a thin, superficial growth consisting of minute hyphae (fungal filaments) produced especially on living plants or organic matter such as wood, paper or leather. Both mould and mildew produce distinct offensive odours, and both are the cause of human ailments.

In nature, 'mildew' can refer to either powdery mildews, species of fungus in the family Erysiphaceae, or downy mildews, fungus-like organisms in the family Peronosporaceae. It is also used more generally to mean mould growth.

In Old English, mildew meant honeydew (a substance secreted by aphids on leaves, formerly thought to distill from the air like dew), and later came to mean mould or fungus.

== Household varieties ==
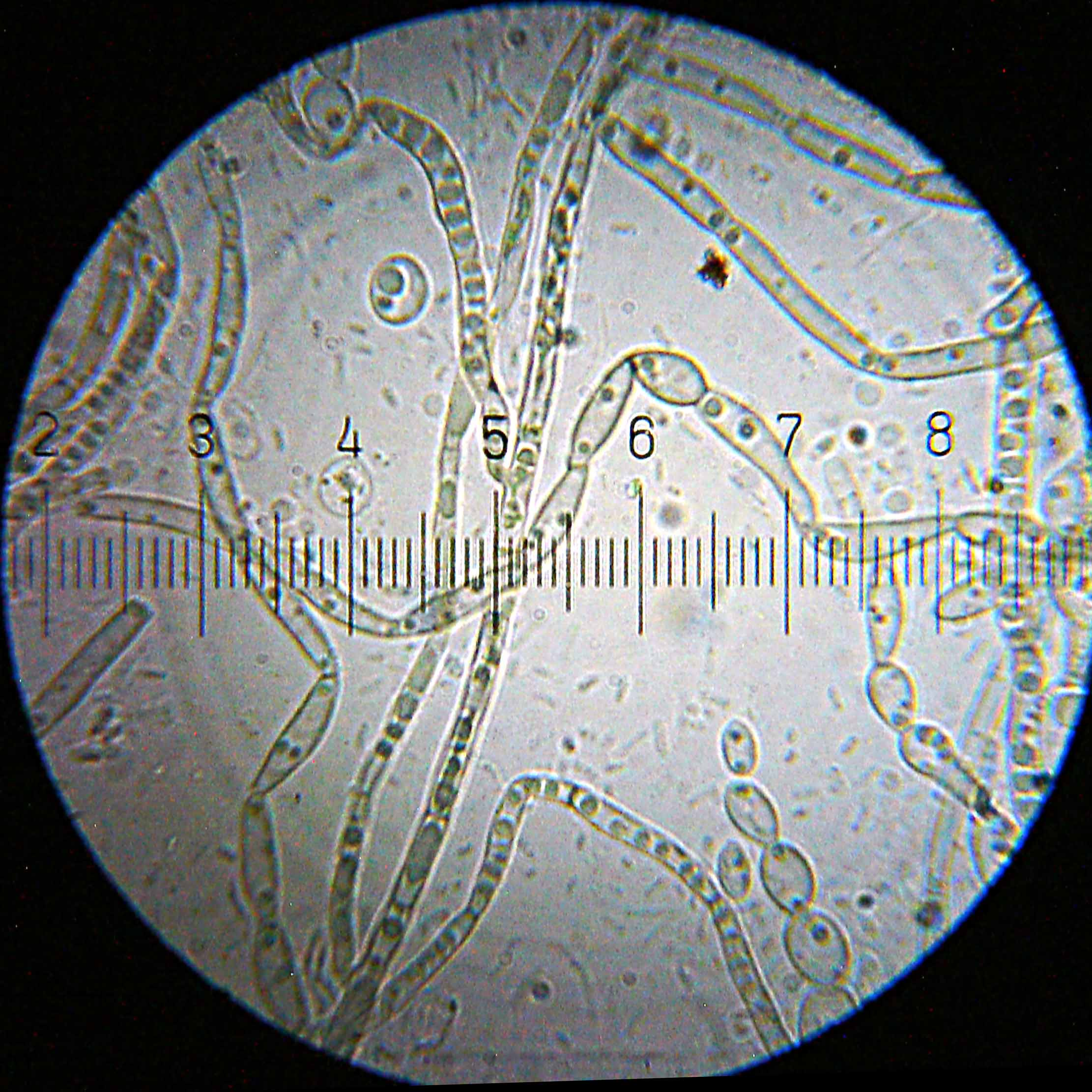
Unidentified species of mildew growing on a plastic shower curtain (scale gradations = 1p μm)

The term mildew is often used generically to refer to mould growth, usually with a flat growth habit. Moulds can thrive on many organic materials, including clothing, leather, paper, and the ceilings, walls and floors of homes or offices with poor moisture control. As with moulds, mildew can be cleaned using a mild detergent and water. While some sources recommend a specialised mildew remover, or substances such as bleach (though they may discolour the surface), this is not needed.

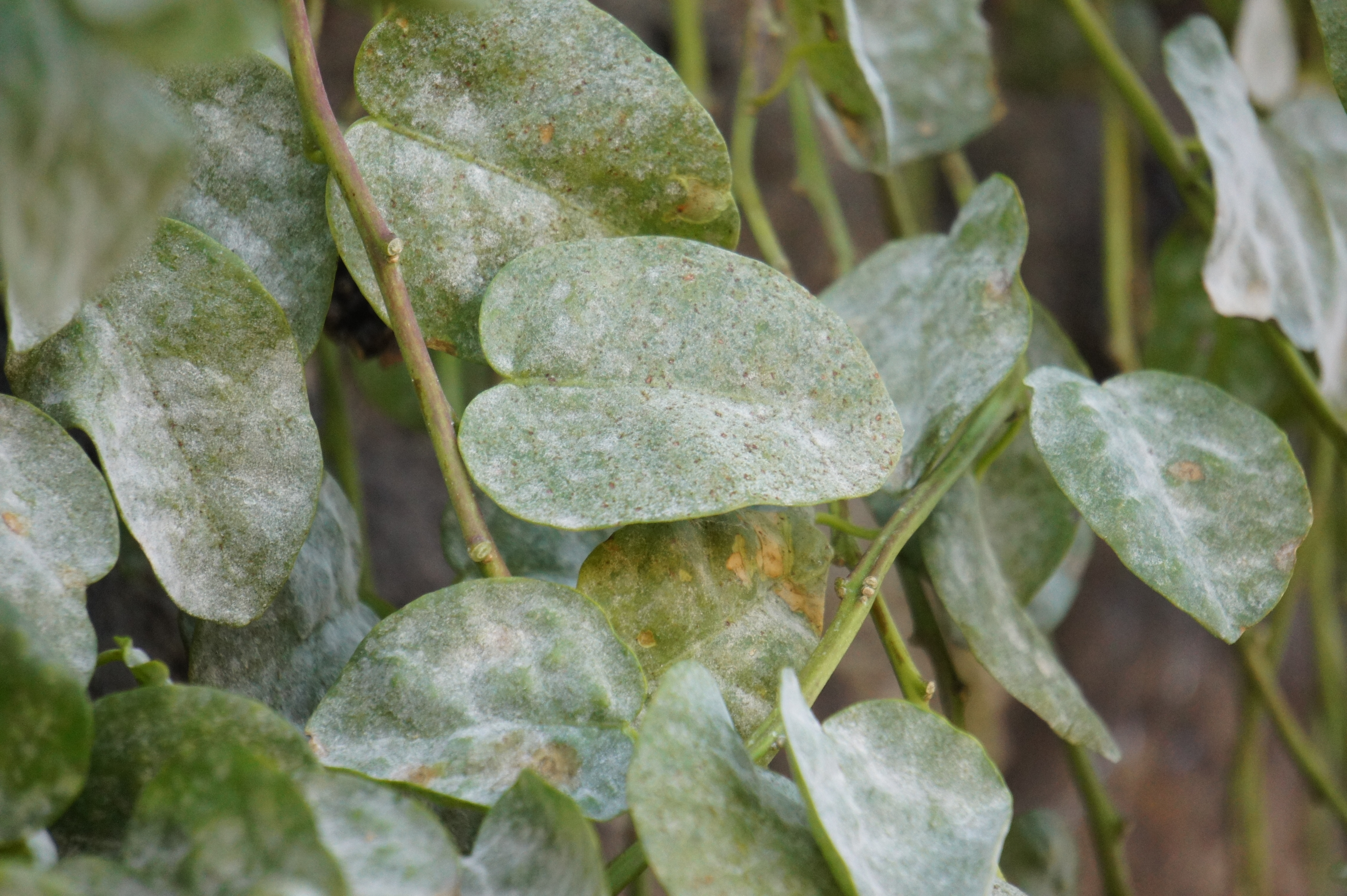
Powdery mildew Phyllactinia taurica s.l. on Capparis

There are many species of mould. Common mould genera that grow in buildings include Cladosporium, Stachybotrys, Penicillium, or Aspergillus. Colour alone is not always a reliable indicator of the species of mould. Proper identification requires a microbiologist or mycologist. Mould may appear to grow on non-cellulosic surfaces but are actually growing on the biofilm that adheres to these surfaces. Glass, plastic, and concrete provide no food for organic growth and as such cannot support mould or mildew growth alone without biofilm present. In places with stagnant air, such as basements, moulds can produce a strong musty odour.

The pink "mildew" often found on plastic shower curtains and bathroom tile is a red yeast, Rhodotorula.

== Environmental conditions ==
Mildew requires certain factors to develop. Without any one of these, it cannot reproduce and grow. The requirements are a food source (any organic material), sufficient ambient moisture (a relative humidity of 62–93%), and reasonable warmth (77–88 °F or 25–31 °C) is optimal. Still, some growth can occur anywhere between freezing and 95 °F (35 °C). Slightly acidic conditions are also preferred. At warmer temperatures, air can hold a greater volume of water; as air temperatures drop, so does the ability of air to hold moisture, which then tends to condense on cool surfaces. This can work to bring moisture onto surfaces where mildew is then likely to grow (such as an exterior wall).

Preventing the growth of mildew therefore requires a balance between moisture and temperature. This can be achieved by minimising the moisture available in the air.

Air temperatures at or below 70 °F (21 °C) will inhibit growth, but only if the relative humidity is low enough to prevent water condensation (i.e., the dew point is not reached).

With warmer temperatures, the water holding capacity of the air increases. This means that if the amount of water vapour in the warming air remains the same, water on solid surfaces or bulk material will tend to evaporate away, drying the material. This again inhibits fungal growth. However, warm, growth-favouring temperatures coupled with high relative humidity will support mildew growth.

Air conditioners are one effective tool for removing moisture and heat from otherwise humid warm air. The coils of an air conditioner cause moisture in the air to condense on them, eventually losing this excess moisture through a drain and placing it back into the environment. They can also inhibit mildew growth by lowering indoor temperatures. For them to be effective, air conditioners must recirculate the existing indoor air and not be exposed to warm, humid outside air. Some energy efficient air conditioners may cool a room so quickly that they do not have an opportunity to also effectively collect and drain significant ambient water vapour.

== See also ==
- Downy mildew
- Phase I environmental site assessment
- Powdery mildew
- Obligate parasite
