= Myrothecium roridum =

Scientific classification
- Domain: Eukaryota
- Kingdom: Fungi
- Division: Ascomycota
- Class: Sordariomycetes
- Order: Hypocreales
- Family: Stachybotryaceae
- Genus: Myrothecium
- Species: M. roridum

Binomial name
- Myrothecium roridum Tode (1790)

Synonyms
- Myrothecium advena Sacc. (1908)

Species of fungus

Myrothecium roridum is a fungal plant pathogen. Myrotoxin B has been isolated from it.
