= High-ozone shock treatment =

Odor removal technique

High ozone shock treatment or ozone blasting is a process for removing unwanted odour, and killing mold, vermin and microorganisms in commercial and residential buildings. The treatment is less expensive than some alternative methods of sterilizing indoor spaces - cleaning or removal of building material, or in extreme cases the abandonment of sick buildings.

== Process ==
High ozone shock treatment involves using an ozone generator with a timer to create lethal levels of ozone in an enclosed odour-ridden or mold-affected room or building for a short period of time, between one and several hours. For safety reasons, the affected area must be evacuated of people, animals and live plants for the duration of the exposure, and for a long enough period afterwards to allow the ozone to dissipate.

== Results ==
Exposure to high levels of ozone kills living organisms and weakens odours.

By killing microorganisms and mold, ozone treatment slows ripening and reduces spoilage of stored fruit.

== Concerns ==
Critics point to a 1997 study which found exposure to high levels of ozone ineffective at mold decontamination, and to the lack of studies showing high ozone shock treatment to be effective. They also point out that killing mold inside walls does not remove the mold, and that dead mold may continue to have adverse health effects on building inhabitants.

The Federal Trade Commission ruled in 1996 against a manufacturer of an Ozone generator, ordering them to cease representing their product's ability to "eliminate, remove, clean or clear any indoor air pollutant from a user's environment"

Ozone is a powerful oxidizing agent which could damage rubber and other materials, and ozone reactions with other material present in buildings could lead to increased levels of noxious chemicals such as formaldehyde.
