= Roridin E =

Mycotoxin

Names
- IUPAC name (1R,3R,8R,12E,17R,18E,20Z,24R,25S,26S)-17-[(1R)-1-hydroxyethyl]-5,13,25-trimethylspiro[2,10,16,23-tetraoxatetracyclo[22.2.1.03,8.08,25]heptacosa-4,12,18,20-tetraene-26,2'-oxirane]-11,22-dione

Identifiers
CAS Number	16891-85-3
3D model (JSmol)	Interactive image
ChEBI	CHEBI:214188
ChEMBL	ChEMBL509175
ChemSpider	10210055
PubChem CID	44593339
UNII	98826FBF79
CompTox Dashboard (EPA)	DTXSID501034221
- InChI: Key: KEEQQEKLEZRLDS-FLGSVKSYSA-N; InChI=1S/C29H38O8/c1-18-9-11-28-16-34-26(32)14-19(2)10-12-33-21(20(3)30)7-5-6-8-25(31)37-22-15-24(36-23(28)13-18)29(17-35-29)27(22,28)4/h5-8,13-14,20-24,30H,9-12,15-17H2,1-4H3/b7-5+,8-6-,19-14+/t20-,21-,22-,23-,24-,27-,28-,29+/m1/s1
- SMILES: CC1=C[C@@H]2[C@@]3(CC1)COC(=O)/C=C(/CCO[C@H](/C=C/C=C\C(=O)O[C@H]4[C@]3([C@]5(CO5)[C@@H](C4)O2)C)[C@@H](C)O)\C

Properties
Chemical formula	C_{29}H_{38}O_{8}
Molar mass	514.6
Appearance	White solid

Hazards
- Lethal dose or concentration (LD, LC)
LD_{50} (median dose)	2 mg/kg (Mouse, injection)

Related compounds
Related compounds	Verrucarin A
- Except where otherwise noted, data are given for materials in their standard state (at 25 °C [77 °F], 100 kPa). Infobox references

Roridin E is a mycotoxin of the trichothecene group. In nature it is mainly found in fungi of the Fusarium and Myrothecium species. The Fusarium and Myrothecium species belong to the most prevalent mycotoxin producing species in south-east Asia and Australia, therefore making them a considerable risk for the food crop production industry.

The fungi are abundant in various agricultural products (cereal crops) and their further processed products such as bread. The Fusarium and Myrothecium species invade and grow on crops, and may produce roridin E under moist and cool conditions.

In rats, the symptoms observed after exposure to roridin E and linoleic acid are increased blood glucose levels and a decrease in glutathione. This may attribute to the toxic effect of roridin E due to its ability to delay the absorption and elimination of the mycotoxin.

== Structure and reactivity ==
Roridin E consists of a trichothecene core structure consisting of a six-membered ring containing one single oxygen atom, flanked by two carbon rings. This core ring structure contains an epoxide bridging carbons 12 and 13, as well as a double bond between carbons 9 and 10. These two functional groups are mainly responsible for the trichothecene's ability to inhibit protein synthesis and exhibits cytotoxic effects. This core structure is also amphipathic, containing polar and nonpolar components. Roridin E differentiates from other mycotoxins due to it macrocyclic structure bridging carbons 4 and 15. Due to this macrocyclic structure, Roridin E is assigned to group D of the trichothecenes.

General chemical struccture of trichothecenes chemicals

The inhibition of protein synthesis and cytotoxic effects are caused by the reactivity of the double bond between carbons 9 and 10, and the epoxide bridging carbons 12 and 13. To prevent these reactive functional groups from causing cytotoxic effects, methods have been developed to reduce the reactivity of roridin E. One of these methods is to incubate with aqueous Ozone at approximately 25 ppm, which oxidates the double bond between carbons 9 and 10 within 4-5 hours. Another method is to use molecular genetics. For example, the Eubacteria strain BBSH 797 produces de-epoxidase enzymes which reduce the epoxide bridging carbons 12 and 13 to a double bond and thus significantly reduce the toxicity of roridin E.

== Synthesis ==
Roridin E is produced via a coupling between a verrucarol molecule and a macrocyclization of a carbon chain, as shown in the reaction scheme below. This entails a series of steps whereby the secondary alcohol is converted into the desired carboxylic acid via a Jones oxidation yielding compound 2. In an additional step, the alcohol of verrucarol on carbon 15 is esterified selectively by adding compound 2, DCC, and 4-pyrrolidinopyridine (4-pp). And the alcohol on carbon 4 was converted to the desired phosphono ester, yielding compound 3. Then the cyclopentylidene was removed and a diol was produced. This diol was then cleaved, deformylated, and treated with excess (formylmethylene)triphenylphosphorane, resulting in the formation of an aldehyde and yielding compound 4. Macrocyclization was accomplished by using finely ground potassium carbonate and 18-crown-6, yielding compound 5. In the final step, compound 5 was treated with potassium tert-butoxide in isopropyl alcohol. These conditions resulted in a conjugation of the C3'=C4' olefin to yield the final compound roridin E.

Chemical synthesis of roridin E

== Toxicity ==
Roridin E is a cytotoxic compounds that creates a significant risk towards all Eukaryotic Cell bearing organisms such as plants and animals because of the ability to inhibit different receptors responsible for protein production. Exposure of roridin E can occur through direct skin contact with cytotoxic producing fungi or through ingestion of contaminated food, fungal matter or plant matter. Trichothecenes such as roridin E are rapidly absorbed due to their low molecular weight an amphipathic nature. This allows them to penetrate the gastrointestinal membrane and distributed throughout the body.

Studies on acute toxicity in mice have determined a median lethal dose (IC_{50}) for injection of 2.0 mg\kg. However, no specific lethal or save dose has been documented for humans.

Exposure of high levels of roridin E has been associated with severe itching, soreness and redness in direct physical contact with the skin. Other reported effects include loss of muscle coordination, nausea, vomiting, diarrhea, difficulty breathing, chest pain, hemoptysiss and bleeding disorders.

=== Mechanism of action ===
Roridin E is known to be cytotoxic toward eukaryotic cellss and is also recognized as a phytotoxin. This compound is a trichothecene, which are known protein synthesis inhibitors. Trichothecenes specifically bind to the ribosome and interfere with the active site of peptidyl transferase, inhibiting the initiation, elongation, or termination steps of protein synthesis.

Roridin E has been shown to inhibit certain receptor tyrosine kinase, including FGFR3, IGF-1R, PDGFRβ, and TrkB, which are involved in cell growth and signaling. The precise mechanism by which roridin E inhibits receptor tyrosine kinases remains unclear. However, trichothecene mycotoxins, including roridin E, are known to interfere with cellular signaling by modifying key proteins involved in phosphorylation.

Research on structurally related trichothecenes suggests that roridin E may inhibit kinase activity through covalent modification of cysteine residues within the enzyme's active site, potentially leading to Irreversible inhibition. Additionally, these compounds are known to disrupt adenosine triphosphate binding, a critical step for kinase activation, which can impair phosphorylation and downstream signal transduction.

By inhibiting receptor tyrosine kinases, roridin E interferes with pathways essential for cell growth, survival, and proliferation. These disruptions can lead to apoptosis or reduced cellular viability, contributing to its potential as an anticancer agent. However, further studies are needed to fully characterize the specific molecular interactions and biological effects of roridin E.

=== Metabolism ===
While there is no specific study on the metabolism of roridin E, there have been studies on the metabolism of structurally related trichothecenes. Trichothecenes are easily absorbed through the skin, gastrointestinal tract, and pulmonary mucosa due to their lipophilicity. The biotransformation process involves the introduction of functional groups (e.g., hydroxy group) into the roridin E molecule, converting it into more polar metabolites. This occurs through various reactions, such as hydrolysis, hydroxylation, and de-epoxidation.

Metabolism primarily takes place in the liver and is facilitated mainly by cytochrome P450 enzymes and carboxylesterase. After metabolism, the less harmful polar metabolites are excreted via the kidneys into the urine or through the bile into the feces.

== Efficacy ==
Isolated roridin E from various fungi have been studied for its cytotoxic effects on different cancer cell lines, including Leukemia and Breast cancer cells In vitro. In one study on the effects of roridin E in 5 different types of human breast cancer cells treated with a roridine E showed significant signs of morphological changes. A reduction of in cell count was observed along with signs of cellular breakage and cell death compared to the control group. The IC50 for human breast cancer cells was determined to be 0.002 mg/L showing significant cytotoxic effects.

In studies on leukemia cells roridin E showed cytotoxic effects with cell death as a result and a IC50 range from 0.0005 and 0.042 μg/mL depending on the strain.

However the uses of roridin E in effective anti cancer treatment has not been studied in much detail because of the high cytotoxic effects, which makes it difficult to use it as an effective treatment.
