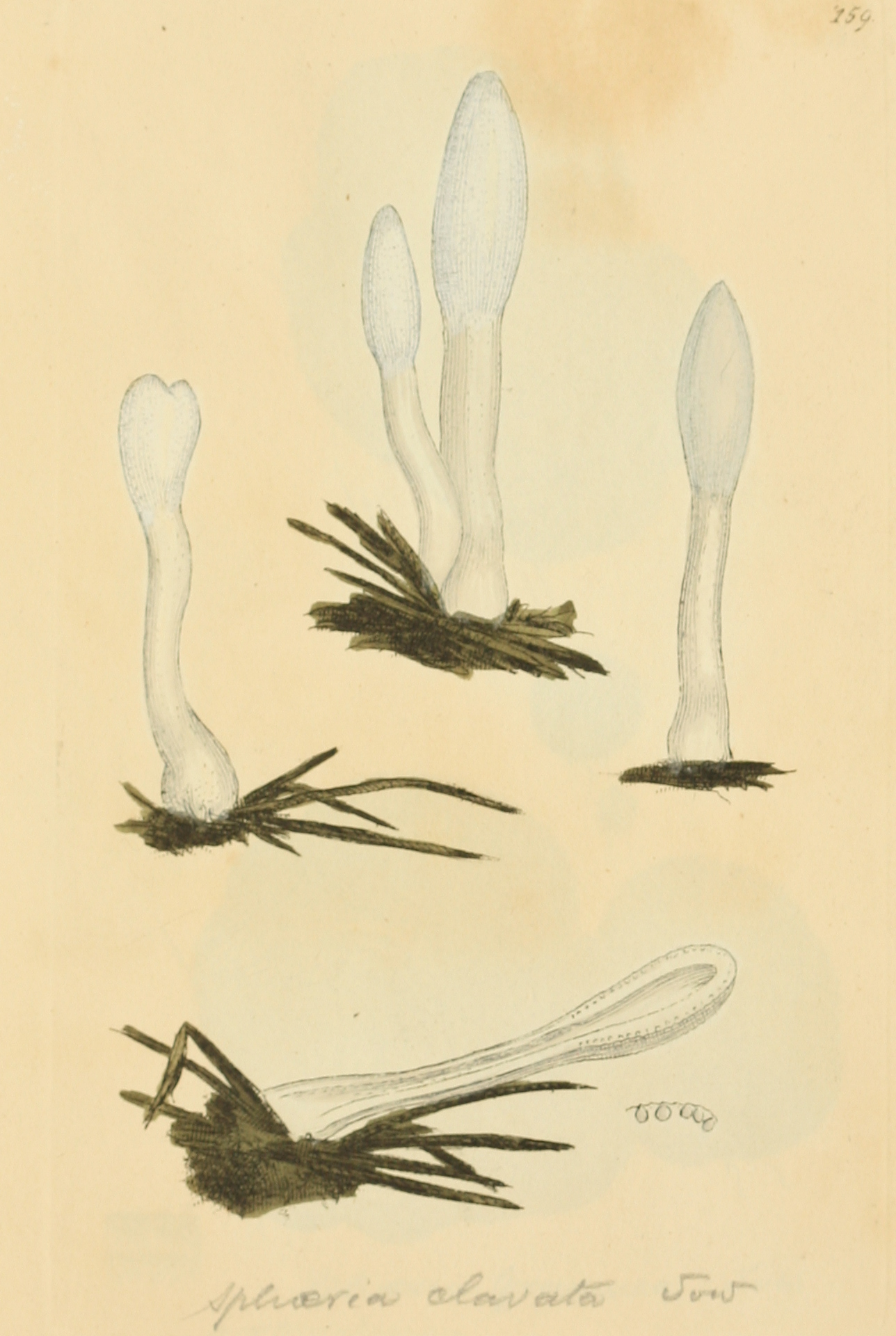
- Podostroma alutaceum, in James Sowerby's Coloured Figures of English Fungi or Mushrooms (1797)

Scientific classification
- Kingdom: Fungi
- Division: Ascomycota
- Class: Sordariomycetes
- Order: Hypocreales
- Family: Hypocreaceae
- Genus: Podostroma; P.Karst. (1892)

Type species
- Podostroma leucopus P.Karst. (1892)

Species
- see text

Synonyms
- Hypocrea subgen. Podocrea Sacc. (1883); Podocrea (Sacc.) Lindau (1897)

= Podostroma =

Genus of fungi

Podostroma is a genus of fungi in the family Hypocreaceae, circumscribed by the Finnish mycologist Petter Karsten in 1892 and containing eleven species (at least one being highly toxic) with a widespread distribution.

== Species ==
- P. africanum
- P. alutaceum
- P. brevipes
- P. cordyceps
- P. cornu-damae
- P. daisenense
- P. eperuae
- P. giganteum
- P. grossum
- P. solmsii
- P. zeylanicum
