= Jean-François Borel =

Belgian pharmacologist (1933–2025)

Jean-François Borel (4 July 1933 – 2 July 2025) was a Belgian microbiologist and immunologist who is considered one of the discoverers of cyclosporin.

== Early life ==
Borel was born in Antwerp, Belgium on 4 July 1933. He studied at the University of Antwerp and the ETH Zurich, where he received his doctorate in immunological genetics in 1964. Afterwards he was at the Swiss Research Institute of Medicine. From 1970 he was in the research laboratories of Sandoz in Basel.

== Discovery of cyclosporin ==
In 1972, Borel was involved in the discovery of the immunosuppressive effects of cyclosporin (Sandoz called Sandimmun), which was isolated by Sandoz in 1971 from a fungus that a Sandoz employee brought back from vacation in Norway. The screening program at Sandoz was previously developed by K. Saameli (and Stähelin) and the immunological testing procedures of S. Lazary. Initially, use as an antibiotic was considered. When it was realized that the substance had only T-cells and therefore had potential in transplantation medicine, Borel aroused much attention in 1976 at a congress in London. In the practice of organ transplantation, the new drug was tested in 1977 by the British surgeon Roy Yorke Calne.

In 1983, Borel became vice president of the pharmaceutical division of Sandoz (later Novartis). Since 1981 he was Professor of Immunopharmacology at the University of Bern.

Also involved in the discovery and development was Hartmann Stähelin, head of the Pharmacology Department at Sandoz, which included the Immunology Department, and later there was a dispute over their respective shares in the discovery.

== Death ==
Borel died on 2 July 2025, at the age of 91.

== Awards ==
- 1984: Cloëtta Prize
- 1985: J. Allyn Taylor International Prize in Medicine
- 1986: Gairdner Foundation International Award
- 1987: Paul Ehrlich and Ludwig Darmstaedter Prize
- 1993: InBev-Baillet Latour Health Prize
- 1991 he became an honorary doctor in Basel.

== See also ==
Organ transplantation
