= Tropical cyclone response =

Disaster response after a hurricane

Hurricane response is the disaster response after a hurricane. This response encompasses assessment and repairs to buildings and infrastructure, removal of debris, and providing public health services. Hurricane responders may be exposed to many hazards such as chemical and biological contaminants, and injuries from work activities.

== Activities ==
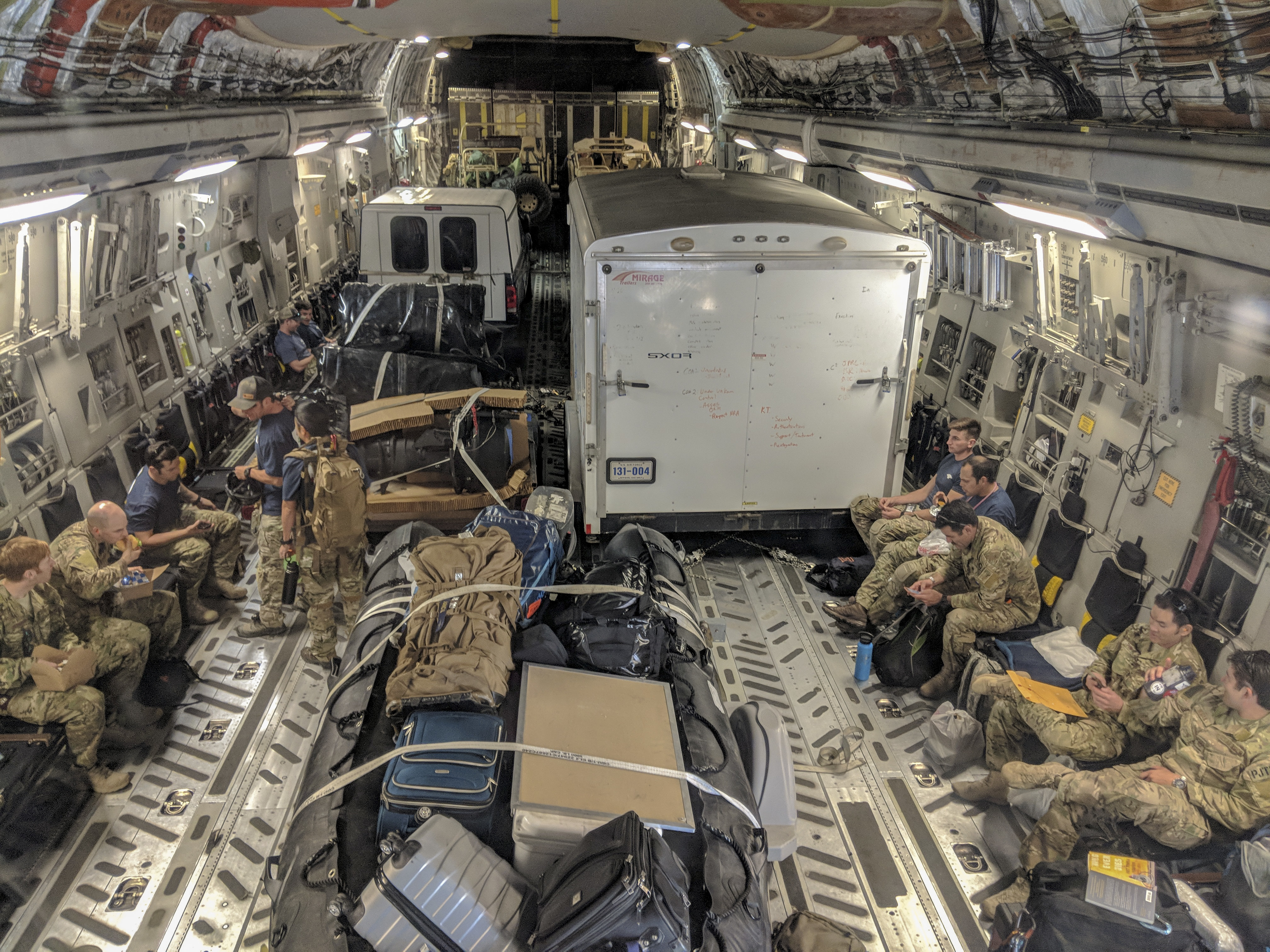
Personnel and equipment from the National Guard of the United States en route to Hurricane Florence response efforts in 2018

Activities performed by hurricane responders include assessment, restoration, and demolition of buildings; removal of debris and waste; repairs to land-based and maritime infrastructure; and providing public health services including search and rescue operations. Maritime response activities include checking for submerged obstructions and updating nautical charts for affected port areas; aerial survey missions to assess damages to affected areas to provide information for emergency responders; identification and survey of vessels or containers that may be leaking hazardous materials; and assessment of environmental impacts of contaminants in coastal and estuarine waters, including the health risk of eating fish and shellfish.

Hurricane response requires coordination between federal, tribal, state, local, and private entities. An Incident Command System is used in the United States to coordinate activities between entities involved in disaster response. According to the National Voluntary Organizations Active in Disaster, potential response volunteers should affiliate with established organizations and should not self-deploy, so that proper training and support can be provided to mitigate the danger and stress of response work.

== Health and safety hazards ==
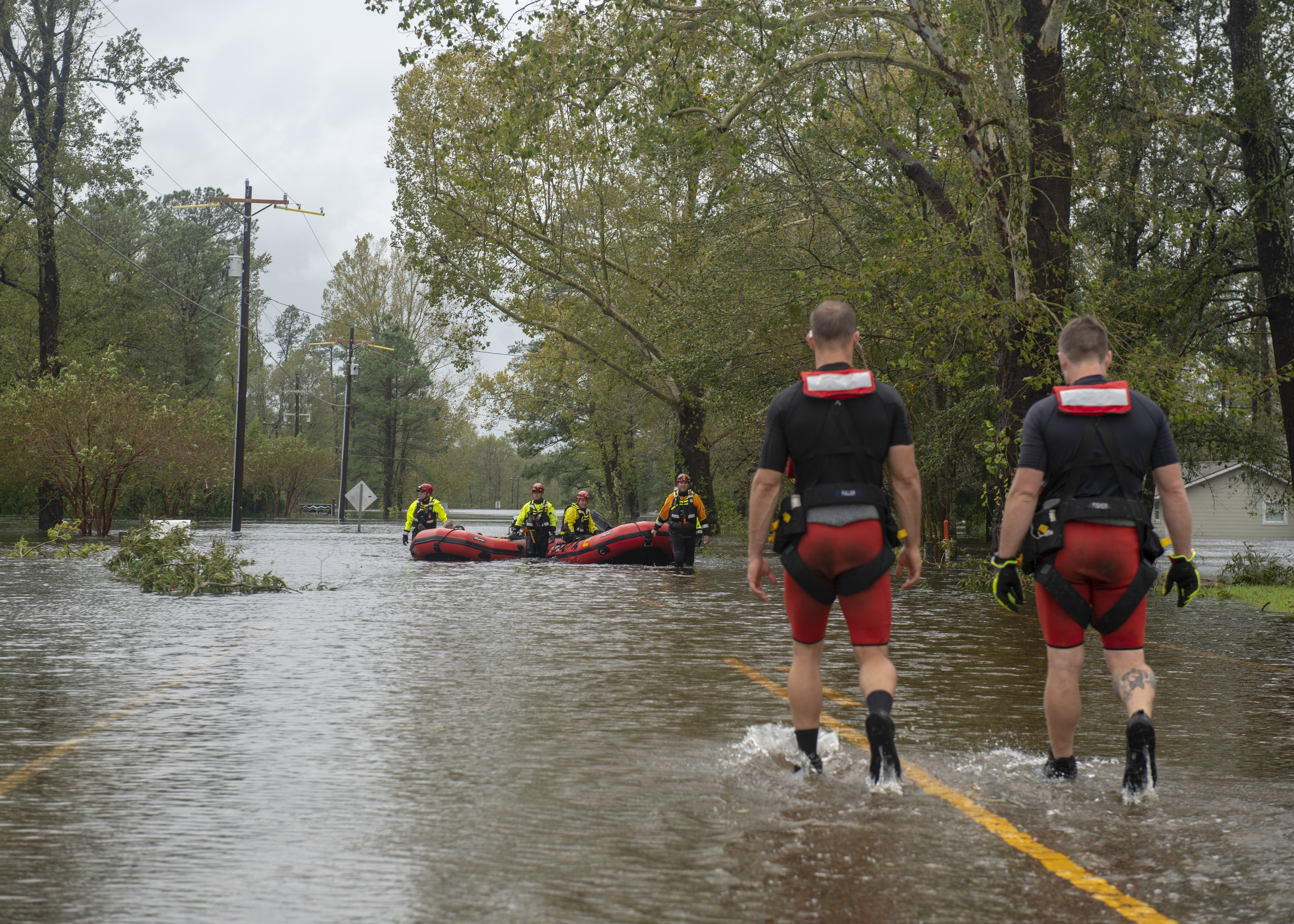
Hurricane response involves working in hazardous conditions, including contamination and electrocution hazards from floodwater.

Hurricane responders may be exposed to chemical and biological contaminants. These include sewage and stored industrial or household chemicals, human remains, and mold growth encouraged by flooding. Proper personal protective equipment, possibly including respirators, can help mitigate these hazards. In addition, fire ants are often disturbed during hurricanes and can float along in floodwaters, leading to the hazards of bites and stings. Asbestos and lead may be present in older buildings, and radon may be a concern in some areas.

Common injuries arise from falls from heights, such as from a ladder; trips, slips, and falls from level surfaces; and use of chainsaws. There is a danger of electrocution from flooded areas, including from backfeed from portable generators. In addition, the use of generators, heaters, or stoves can lead to carbon monoxide poisoning if used indoors or close to an open window or air conditioner. Motor vehicle safety is important as most responders ride in motor vehicles, or may be required to direct traffic. Violence and looting is another hazard. Injuries may also result from entering buildings with compromised structural integrity, noise, unexpected start-up or release of stored energy by machines or equipment, impact to the eyes or face, manual lifting, animal bites, poisonous plants, and sunburn.

Long and irregular shifts may lead to sleep deprivation and fatigue, increasing the risk of injuries. Additionally, heat stress is a concern as workers are often exposed to hot and humid temperatures, wear protective clothing and equipment, and have physically difficult tasks. Heat stress may increase the risk of other injuries due to sweaty palms, fogged-up safety glasses, mental confusion, and dizziness.

Pre-exposure and post-exposure medical monitoring is recommended to establish fitness for and identify adverse effects from response work. Workers may experience mental stress associated with a traumatic incident.
