= Indoor mold =

Interior fungal growth

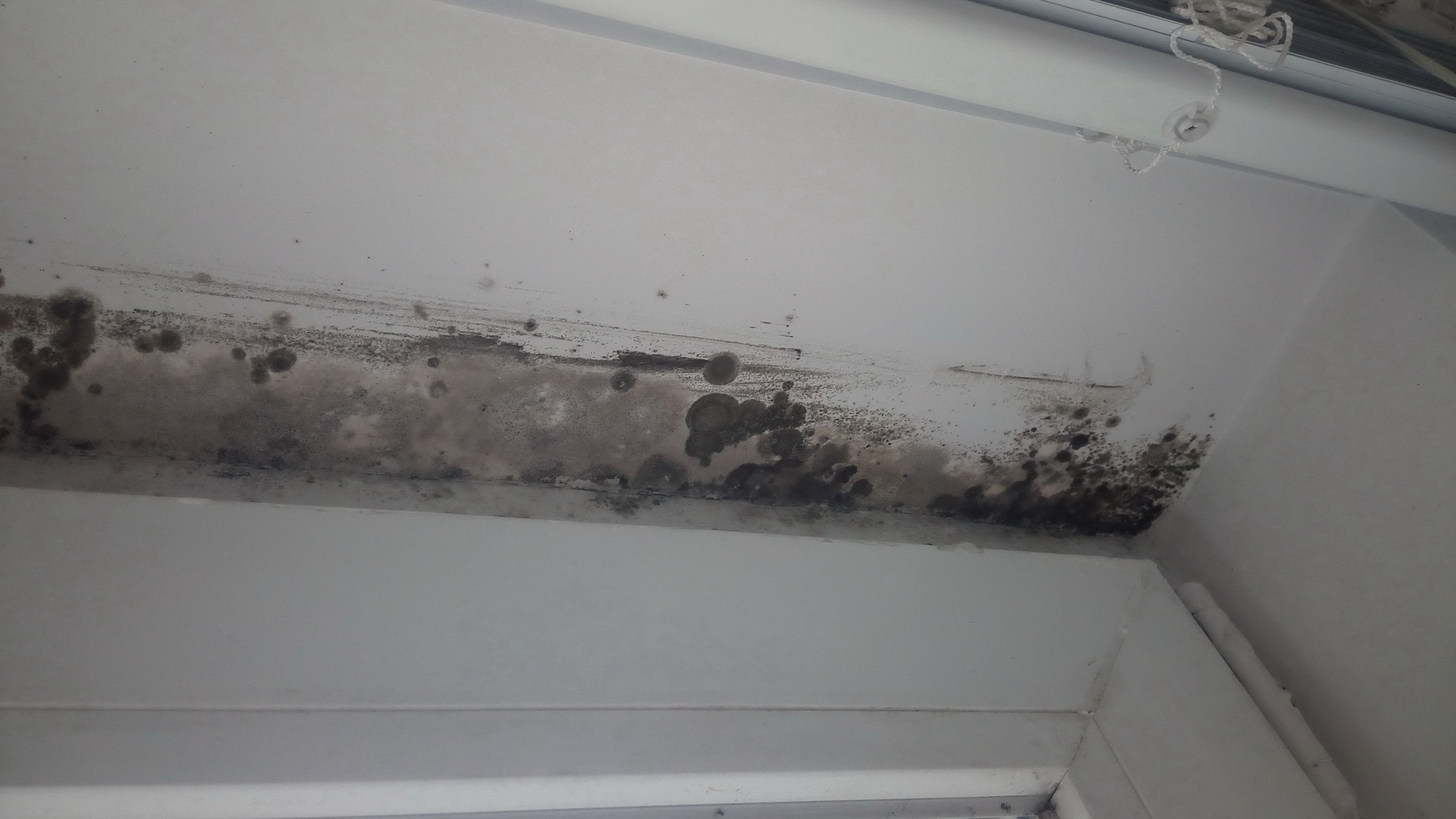
Indoor mold on the head jamb of the window in a multi-story building

Indoor mold (American English) or indoor mould (British English), also referred to as mildew, is a fungal growth that develops on wet materials in interior spaces. Mold is a natural, ubiquitous part of the environment and plays an important part in nature by breaking down dead organic matter such as fallen leaves and dead trees; indoors, mold growth should be avoided as it can affect the structural integrity of buildings and pose potential health risks to susceptible individuals. Mold reproduces by means of tiny spores, which range in size from 1 to 40 microns. The spores are like seeds—but invisible to the naked eye—that float through the air and deposit on surfaces. When the temperature, moisture, and available nutrient conditions are correct, the spores can form into new mold colonies where they are deposited. There are many types of mold, but all require moisture and a food source for growth. Common indoor molds include Aspergillus, Cladosporium, Penicillium, and Stachybotrys chartarum, which contribute to respiratory issues and allergic reactions in sensitive individuals.

== Health effects ==
Indoor mold is generally not regarded as a dominant allergen that affects healthy individuals. However, mold exposure can lead to a range of health effects, with sensitivity differing from person to person. The health impact of its exposure depends on factors such as duration, concentration, and type of exposure, which can influence an individual's susceptibility over time. Prolonged exposure and high level of mold exposure can increase the risk of allergic reactions and respiratory diseases, such as asthma, allergic rhinitis, and hypersensitivity pneumonitis. In fact, studies indicate that more than half of adult workers in moldy/humid buildings suffer from nasal or sinus symptoms due to mold exposure.

While the risk of infections caused by indoor mold is generally low for healthy individuals, certain populations are more vulnerable. Immunocompromised people and those with chronic lung illnesses, such as obstructive lung disease, are at higher risk for mold allergies and may get serious infections in their lungs when they are exposed to mold. To minimize risks, individuals in these groups should avoid environments prone to mold growth, such as compost piles, cut grass, and wooded areas.

=== Symptoms ===
Common symptoms of mold exposure may include nasal congestion; sinusitis; rhinorrhea, eye irritation; respiratory difficulties, such as wheezing, chest pain, cough, and persistent sneezing; throat irritation; skin irritation, such as a rash; and headache. Damp indoor environments correlate with upper-respiratory-tract symptoms, such as coughing and wheezing in people with asthma.

==== Asthma ====
While population-based studies in healthy adults provide limited evidence of a direct causal link between mold exposure and asthma development, research strongly supports the connection between mold exposure in a workplace setting and both the incidence and exacerbation of occupational asthma in adults. Similarly, studies in children have shown that infants in homes with mold have a much greater risk of developing asthma and allergic rhinitis. Infants may develop respiratory symptoms as a result of exposure to Penicillium, a fungal genus. Infants and individuals with asthma who reside in damp indoor environments may experience persistent coughing or wheezing, which could indicate mold-related respiratory issues.

== Causes and growing conditions ==
Mold is ubiquitous on Earth and can grow on almost any substance when moisture is present. It reproduces by releasing spores, which are carried by air currents. When these spores land on a moist surface suitable for life, they begin to grow.

For indoor mold to thrive, three essential factors are required: nutrients—such as cellulose, commonly found in building materials; moisture—which initiates the decaying process; and time—mold growth typically begins from 24 to 48 hours after the provision of growing conditions.

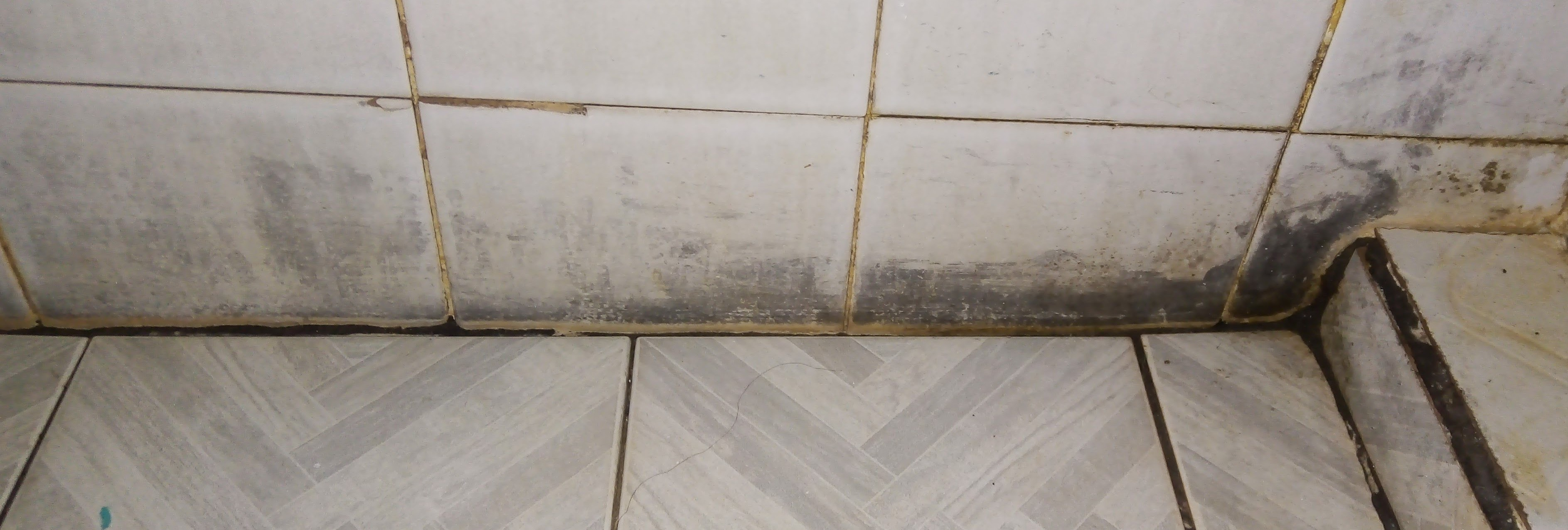
Black indoor mold growing in a humid bathroom

Common cellulose-based building materials, such as plywood, drywall, furring strips, finish carpentry, cabinetry, wood framing, composite wood flooring, carpets, and carpet padding provide food for mold. In carpet, organic load such as invisible dust and cellulose are food sources.

Because common building materials are capable of sustaining mold growth and mold spores are ubiquitous, mold growth in an indoor environment is typically related to water or moisture exposure and may be caused by incomplete drying of flooring materials (such as concrete). Flooding, leaky roofs, poor building maintenance, or indoor plumbing problems can lead to interior mold growth. Indeed, after water damage to a building, mold grows in walls and then becomes dormant until subsequent high humidity; suitable conditions reactivate mold. Water vapor often condenses on surfaces cooler than the moisture-laden air, enabling mold to flourish. This moisture vapor passes through walls and ceilings, typically condensing during the winter in climates with a long heating season. Floors over crawl spaces and basements, without vapor barriers or with dirt floors, are mold-prone. The "doormat test" detects moisture from concrete slabs without a sub-slab vapor barrier. Inorganic materials, such as metal or polished concrete, do not support mold growth, although surface mold growth is still possible.

Additionally, insufficient ventilation may accelerate moisture buildup. Visible mold colonies may form where ventilation is poorest and on perimeter walls (because they are nearest the dew point). Mold grows best in warm temperatures, 25 to 30 °C (77 to 86 °F), although growth may occur between 0 and 35 °C (32 and 95 °F).

Removing one of the three requirements for mold growth reduces (or eliminates) new mold growth: moisture, food for the mold spores (for example, dust or dander), and warmth since mold generally does not grow in cold environments.

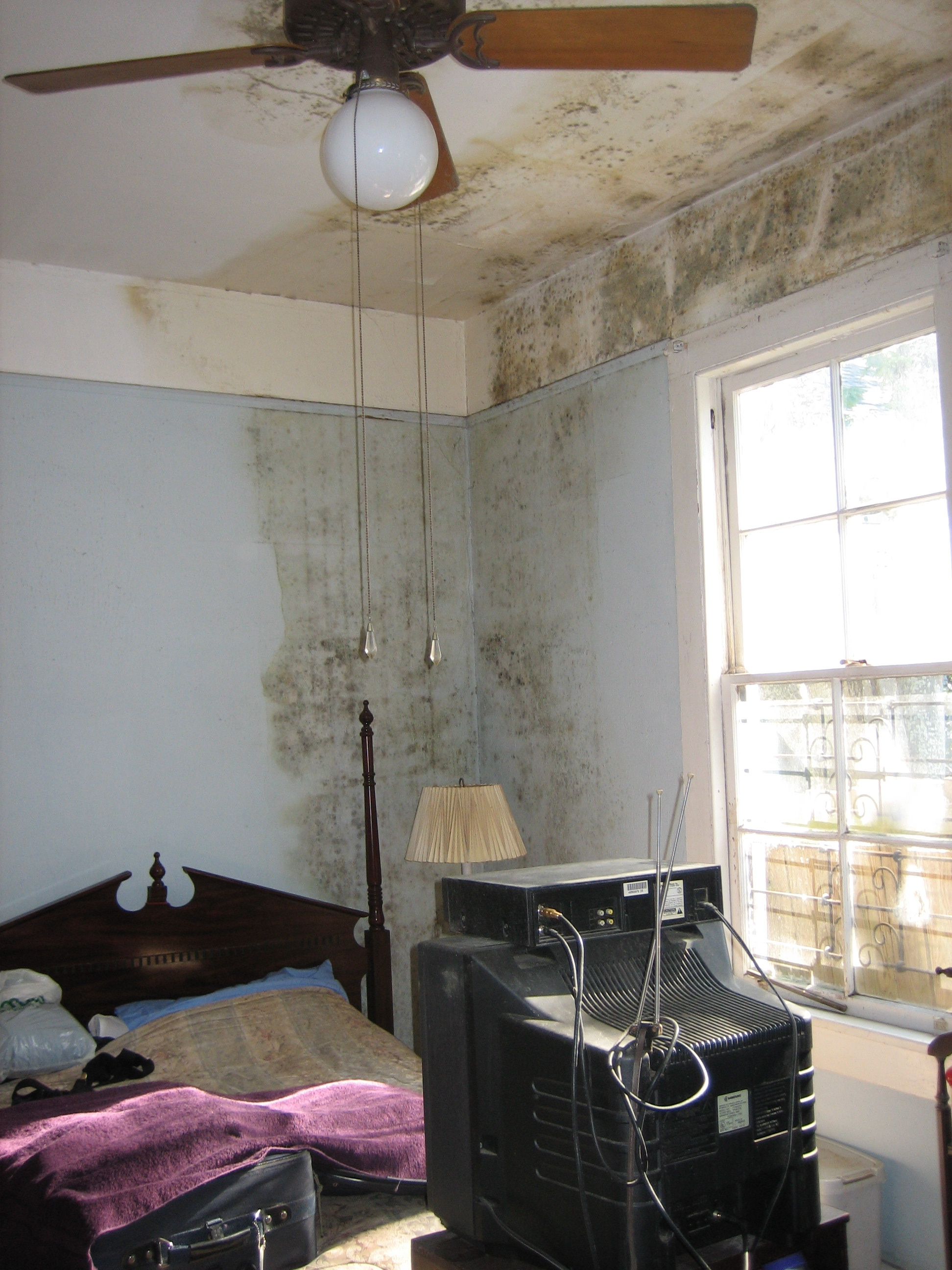
Although this home experienced minor exterior damage from Hurricane Katrina, small leaks and inadequate airflow permitted mold infestation.

=== Hidden mold ===
Mold is detectable by smell and signs of water damage on walls or ceiling and can grow in places invisible to the human eye, posing a significant health hazard when exposed for a prolonged time. It may be found behind wallpaper or paneling, on the inside of dropped ceilings, the back of drywall, or on the underside of carpets or carpet padding. Piping in walls may also be a source of mold, since they may leak (causing moisture and condensation). After a flood or major leak, mycotoxin levels are higher, even after a building has dried out.

If a house has mold, the moisture may originate in the basement or crawl space, a leaking roof or a leak in plumbing pipes. If there are mold problems in a house only during certain times of the year, the house is probably too airtight or too drafty. Mold problems occur in airtight homes more frequently in the warmer months (when humidity is high inside the house, and moisture is trapped), and occur in drafty homes more frequently in the colder months (when warm air escapes from the living area and condenses). If a house is artificially humidified by the use of a humidifier during the winter, this can create conditions favorable to mold.

Heating, ventilation, and air conditioning (HVAC) systems can also serve as hidden breeding grounds for mold, as they can provide all three requirements for mold growth. The air conditioning system creates a difference in temperature, encouraging condensation. The high rate of dusty air movement through an HVAC system may furnish ample food for mold. Since the air-conditioning system is not always running, warm conditions are the final component for mold growth.

== Prevention ==
Mold growth can be inhibited by keeping surfaces at conditions that are further from condensation, with relative humidity levels below 75%. This usually translates to a relative humidity of indoor air below 60%, in agreement with the guidelines for thermal comfort that recommend a relative humidity between 40–60%. Moisture buildup in buildings may arise from water penetrating areas of the building envelope or fabric, from plumbing leaks, rainwater or groundwater penetration, or from condensation due to improper ventilation, insufficient heating or poor thermal quality of the building envelope. Even something as simple as drying clothes indoors on radiators can increase the risk of mold growth, if the humidity produced is not able to escape the building via ventilation.

Residential mold may be prevented and controlled by cleaning and repairing rain gutters, to prevent moisture seepage into the home; keeping air-conditioning drip pans clean and drainage lines clear; monitoring indoor humidity; drying areas of moisture or condensation and removing their sources; ensuring that there is adequate ventilation by installing an exhaust fan in your bathroom; treating exposed structural wood or wood framing with a fungicidal encapsulation coating after pre-cleaning (particularly homes with a crawl space, unfinished basement, or a poorly-ventilated attic).

For a more proactive or aggressive preventive approach, forward-looking infrared (FLIR) thermal imaging can be used to identify hidden moisture pockets, areas of heat loss, and potential leak risks before visible mold growth occurs. This technique helps detect early signs of moisture intrusion that are otherwise invisible to the naked eye, allowing homeowners and inspectors to address problems before they escalate.

== Assessment ==
An observation of the indoor environment should be conducted before any sampling is performed. The area should be surveyed for odors indicating mold or bacterial growth, moisture sources, such as stagnant water or leaking pipes, and water-damaged building materials. This can include moving furniture, lifting (or removing) carpets, checking behind wallpaper or paneling, checking ventilation ductwork and exposing wall cavities. Efforts typically focus on areas where there are signs of liquid moisture or water vapor (humidity), or where moisture problems are suspected. In many cases, if materials have failed to dry out several days after the suspected water event, mold growth can be suspected even if it is not immediately visible. Often, quick decisions about the immediate safety and health of the environment can be made by these observations before sampling is even needed. The United States Environmental Protection Agency (EPA) does not generally recommend sampling unless an occupant of the space has symptoms. In most cases, if visible mold growth is present, sampling is unnecessary. Sampling should be performed by a trained professional with specific experience in mold-sampling protocols, sampling methods and the interpretation of findings. It should be done only to make a particular determination, such as airborne spore concentration or identifying a particular species.

=== Sampling ===
Before sampling, a subsequent course of action should be determined.

In the U.S., sampling and analysis should follow the recommendations of the Occupational Safety and Health Administration (OSHA), National Institute for Occupational Safety and Health (NIOSH), the EPA and the American Industrial Hygiene Association (AIHA). Types of samples include air, surface, bulk, dust, and swab. Multiple types of sampling are recommended by the AIHA, since each has limitations.

==== Air sampling ====
Air is the most common form of sampling to assess mold levels. Air sampling is considered to be the most representative method for assessing respiratory exposure to mold. Indoor and outdoor air are sampled, and their mold spore concentrations are compared. Indoor mold concentrations should be less than or equal to outdoor concentrations with similar distributions of species. A predominant difference in species or higher indoor concentrations can indicate poor indoor air quality and a possible health hazard. Air sampling can be used to identify hidden mold and is often used to assess the effectiveness of control measures after remediation. An indoor mold air sampling campaign should be performed over the course of at least several days as the environmental conditions can lead to variations in the day-to-day mold concentration. Stationary samplers assess a specific environment, such as a room or building, whereas personal samplers assess the mold exposure one person receives in all of the environments they enter over the course of sampling. Personal samplers can be attached to workers to assess their respiratory exposures to molds on the job. Personal samplers usually show higher levels of exposure than stationary samples due to the "personal cloud" effect, where the activities of the person re-suspend settled particles. There are several methods that can be used for indoor mold air sampling.

==== Swab and surface sampling ====
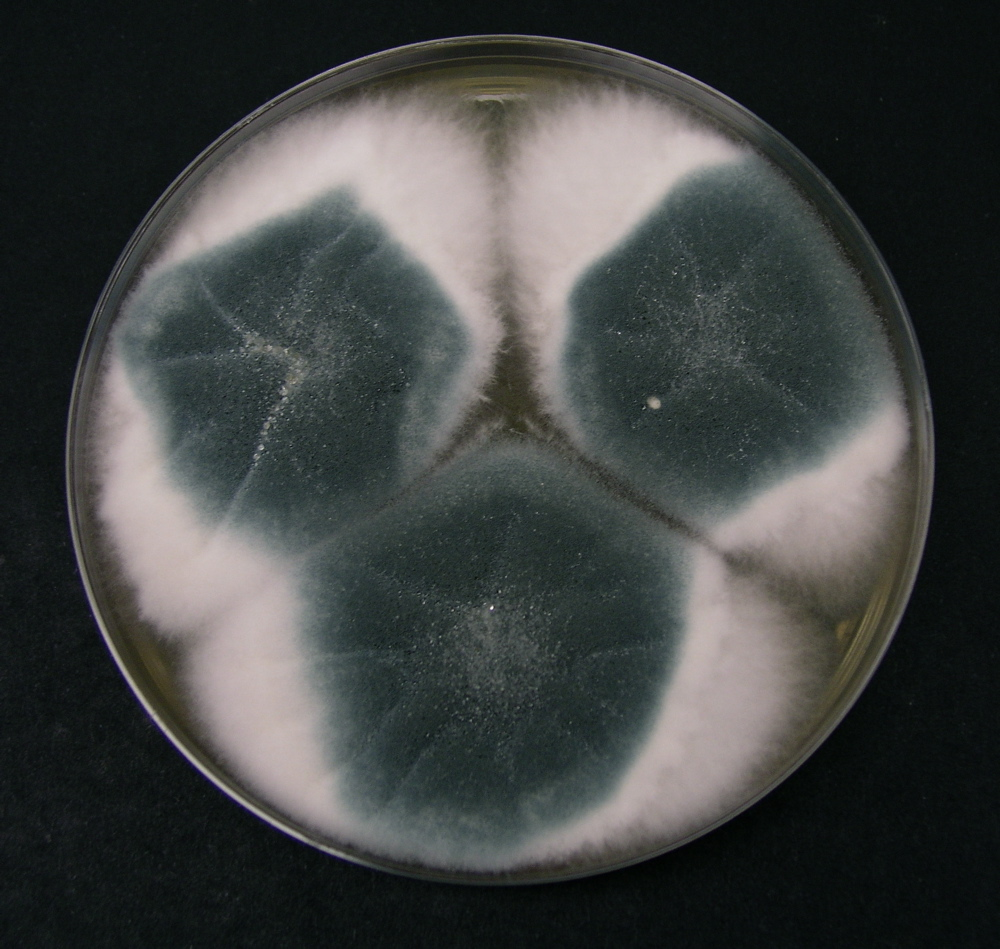
Culture dish with Aspergillus fumigatus colonies, a species commonly found in indoor air

Surface sampling measures the number of mold spores deposited on indoor surfaces. With swab, a cotton swab is rubbed across the area being sampled, often a measured area, and subsequently sent to the mold testing laboratory. The swab can rubbed on an agar plate to grow the mold on a growth medium. Final results indicate mold levels and species located in the suspect area. Surface sampling can be used to identify the source of mold exposure. Molecular analyses, such as qPCR, may also be used for species identification and quantification. Swab and surface sampling can give detailed information about the mold, but cannot measure the actual mold exposure because it is not aerosolized.

==== Bulk and dust sampling ====
Bulk removal of material from the contaminated area is used to identify and quantify the mold in the sample. This method is often used to verify contamination and identify the source of contamination. Dust samples can be collected using a vacuum with a collection filter attached. Dust from surfaces such as floors, beds, or furniture is often collected to assess health effects from exposure in epidemiology studies. Researchers of indoor mold also use a long-term settled dust collection system where a dust cloth or a petri dish is left out in the environment for a set period of time, sometimes weeks. Dust samples can be analyzed using culture-based or culture-independent methods. Quantitative PCR is a DNA-based molecular method that can identify and quantify fungal species. The Environmental Relative Moldiness Index (ERMI) is a numerical that can be used in epidemiological studies to assess mold burdens of houses in the United States. The ERMI consists of a list of 36 fungal species commonly associated with damp houses that can be measured using qPCR. Like swab and surface sampling, bulk and dust sampling can give detailed information about the mold source, but cannot accurately determine the level of exposure to the source.

== Remediation ==
In a situation where there is visible mold and the indoor air quality may have been compromised, mold remediation may be needed. The first step in solving an indoor mold problem is to remove the moisture source; new mold will begin to grow on moist, porous surfaces within 24 to 48 hours. There are a number of ways to prevent mold growth. Some cleaning companies specialize in fabric restoration, removing mold (and mold spores) from clothing to eliminate odor and prevent further damage to garments.

The effective way to clean mold is to use detergent solutions which physically remove mold. Many commercially available detergents marketed for mold cleanup include an antifungal agent.

Mold will start to grow once moisture and organic material come together. This can happen anywhere in a property including bathrooms, walls, garages, bedrooms, kitchens, etc. A smell is a good indicator that there is mold growth that needs immediate attention. If not attended to, the growth can spread through the property contributing to adverse health problems and causing secondary damage to the structure and its contents. Significant mold growth may require professional mold remediation to remove the affected building materials and eradicate the source of excess moisture. In extreme cases of mold growth in buildings, it may be more cost-effective to condemn the building than to reduce mold to safe levels.

The goals of remediation are to remove (or clean) contaminated materials, preventing fungi (and fungi-contaminated dust) from entering an occupied (or non-contaminated) area while protecting workers performing the abatement.

=== Cleanup and removal methods ===
The purpose of cleanup is to eliminate mold and remove contaminated materials. Killing mold with a biocide is insufficient, since chemical substances and proteins causing reactions in humans remain in dead mold. The following methods are used:

- Evaluation: Before remediation, the area is assessed to ensure safety, clean up the entire moldy area, and properly approach the mold. The EPA provides the following instructions:
- HVAC cleaning: Should be done by a trained professional.
- Protective clothing/PPE: Includes a half- or full-face respirator. Goggles with a half-face respirator prevent mold spores from reaching the mucous membranes of the eyes. Disposable hazmat suits are available to keep out particles down to one micrometer, and personal protective equipment keep mold spores from entering skin cuts. Gloves are made of rubber, nitrile, polyurethane, or neoprene.
- Dry brushing or agitation device: Wire brushing or sanding is used when microbial growth can be seen on solid wood surfaces such as framing or underlayment (the subfloor).
- Dry-ice blasting: Removes mold from wood and cement; however, this process may spray mold and its byproducts into surrounding air.
- Wet vacuum: Wet vacuuming is used on wet materials, and this method is one of those approved by the EPA.
- Damp wipe: Removal of mold from non-porous surfaces by wiping or scrubbing with water and a detergent and drying quickly.
- HEPA (high-efficiency particulate air) vacuum cleaner: Used in remediation areas after materials have been dried and contaminated materials removed; collected debris and dust is stored to prevent debris release.
- Debris disposal: Sealed in the remediation area, debris is usually discarded with ordinary construction waste.

=== Equipment ===
Equipment used in mold remediation includes:

- Moisture meter to measure drying of damaged materials;
- Humidity gauge, often paired with a thermometer;
- Borescope, a flexible tube with a camera at the end, to illuminate potential mold problems inside walls, ceilings and crawl spaces;
- Digital camera to document findings during evaluation;
- Personal protective equipment (PPE): respirators, gloves, impervious suit, and eye protection;
- Thermographic camera, infrared thermal-imaging cameras to identify secondary moisture sources.
- Hepa Vacuum, also known as High Efficiency Particulate Filter, is commonly used with mold remediation for safely removing any mold spores from the surface and building materials to deter these pores from becoming airborne.

== Protection levels ==
During mold remediation in the U.S., the level of contamination dictates the protection level for remediation workers. Contamination levels have been enumerated as I, II, III, and IV:

| Level | Area Size | Personnel & Training | Protective Measures | Containment & Clean-Up |
|---|---|---|---|---|
| I | Small isolated (≤10 sq. ft.) | Regular maintenance staff, trained on mold clean-up & health hazards | N-95 respirator, gloves, eye protection | Unoccupied area, dust suppression (misting), clean with detergent solution and damp cloth |
| II | Mid-Sized Areas (10-30 sq. ft.) | Regular maintenance staff, trained on mold clean-up & health hazards | N-95 respirator, gloves, eye protection | Same as Level I + plastic sheet coverage and HEPA vacuuming |
| III | Large Isolated Areas (30-100 sq. ft.) | Consult industrial hygienists or safety professionals for oversight | N-95 respirator, gloves, eye protection | Same as Level II + sealed ducts |
| III | Extensive Contamination (>100 sq. ft.) | Consult industrial hygienists or safety professionals for oversight | Full face respirators with HEPA cartridges, disposable protective clothing for entire body, gloves | Complete isolation, exhaust fan with HEPA filter, airlocks, HEPA vacuuming, decontamination chamber |

After remediation, the premises should be reevaluated to ensure success.

== See also ==
- Environmental engineering
- Environmental health
- High-ozone shock treatment
- House dust mite
- Hurricane response
- Occupational asthma
- Sick building syndrome
