= Myrotoxin B =

Identifiers
CAS Number	99486-49-4
3D model (JSmol)	Interactive image
PubChem CID	6540635
UNII	1PX13P7HGK
- InChI: InChI=1S/C29H34O11/c1-15-10-20-27(12-18(15)37-16(2)30)13-35-25(33)24-28(40-24)8-9-34-17(23(28)32)6-4-5-7-22(31)39-19-11-21(38-20)29(14-36-29)26(19,27)3/h5-7,10,18-21,23-24,32H,4,8-9,11-14H2,1-3H3/b7-5-,17-6-/t18-,19+,20+,21+,23?,24+,26?,27+,28+,29-/m0/s1 Key: BDPRKFBFVAVFJK-YMQWBDTMSA-N
- SMILES: CC1=C[C@]2([H])[C@]([C@@](C)3[C@]4(CO4)[C@@]([H])(C[C@H]3OC5=O)O2)(CO[C@]([C@@H](O7)[C@]([C@H]/6O)7CCOC6=C/C/C=C\5)=O)C[C@@H]1OC(C)=O

Properties
Chemical formula	C_{29}H_{34}O_{11}
Molar mass	558.580 g·mol^{−1}
Melting point	195 to 197 °C (383 to 387 °F; 468 to 470 K)
- Except where otherwise noted, data are given for materials in their standard state (at 25 °C [77 °F], 100 kPa). verify (what is ?) Infobox references

Myrotoxin B is a macrocyclic trichothecene first isolated in 1985. It was tested on Swiss mice and found to be very toxic, though not the most toxic of the three toxins that were tested at that time. It has also been isolated from Myrothecium roridum, a pathogen leaf spot that affects mulberry, though it is unknown if it is used as a pathotoxin.
