= Peethambara =

Scientific classification
- Kingdom: Fungi
- Division: Ascomycota
- Class: Sordariomycetes
- Order: Hypocreales
- Family: Stachybotryaceae
- Genus: Peethambara; Subram. & Bhat, 1978

Type species
- Peethambara sundara Subram. & Bhat, 1978

Genus of fungi

Peethambara is a genus of fungi in the Hypocreales order; previously classed incertae sedis (relationships unknown), this genus is now placed in the family Stachybotryaceae.

This is a monotypic genus, containing the single species Peethambara sundara.
