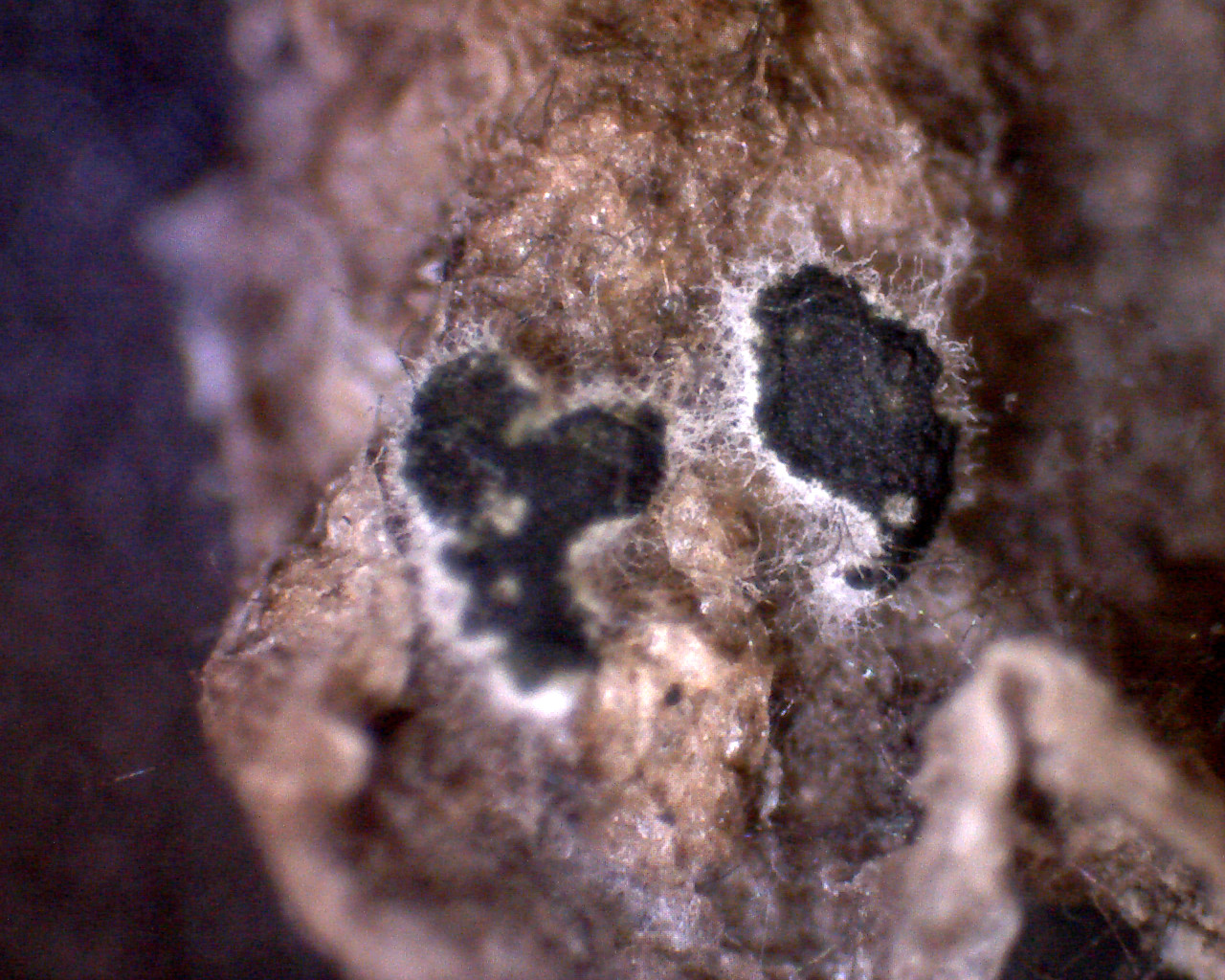

Scientific classification
- Domain: Eukaryota
- Kingdom: Fungi
- Division: Ascomycota
- Class: Sordariomycetes
- Subclass: Hypocreomycetidae
- Order: Hypocreales
- Family: Stachybotryaceae
- Genus: Myrothecium; Tode, 1790

= Myrothecium =

Genus of fungi

Myrothecium is a genus of fungi in the order Hypocreales and is now placed in the family Stachybotryaceae.

== Species ==
The Catalogue of Life lists:

- Myrothecium atroviride
- Myrothecium bisetosum
- Myrothecium carmichaelii
- Myrothecium cinctum
- Myrothecium inundatum (type species)
- Myrothecium lachastrae
- Myrothecium masonii
- Myrothecium prestonii
- Myrothecium roridum
- Myrothecium setiramosum
- Myrothecium tongaense
- Myrothecium verrucaria
