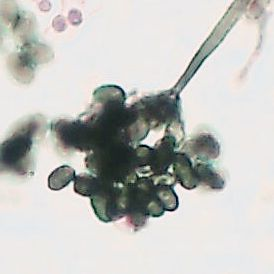
- Conidia of Stachybotrys sp.

Scientific classification
- Kingdom: Fungi
- Division: Ascomycota
- Class: Sordariomycetes
- Order: Hypocreales
- Family: Stachybotryaceae; Lombard & Crous, 2014

Synonyms
- Stachybotriaceae Lombard & Crous, 2014

= Stachybotryaceae =

Family of fungi

The Stachybotryaceae are a family of fungi in the order Hypocreales; the genera it contains have been described as "hyper-diverse".

The family was originally introduced by Crous et al. (2014) to accommodate three genera; Myrothecium, Peethamabra and Stachybotrys. It was revised by Lombard et al. (2016) based on morphological characters and multi-locus phylogenetic analysis. They accepted 33 genera in the family, including 21 new genera.

Generally, the species in Stachybotryaceae are characterized by asexual morphs with mononematous to sporodochial to synnematous conidiomata, usually with phialidic conidiogenous cells that produce 0–1-septate conidia in dark green dry chains or slimy masses. Three species of Stachybotryaceae;(Koorchalomella salmonispora, Stachybotrys chartarum and Stachybotrys chlorohalonata) have been reported from freshwater habitats.

== Genera ==
As accepted in 2020 (with amount of species):

- Achroiostachys L. Lombard & Crous (6)
- Albifimbria L. Lombard & Crous (5)
- Albosynnema E.F. Morris (2)
- Alfaria Crous, Montaño-Mata & García-Jim. (13)
- Alfariacladiella Crous & R.K. Schumach. (1)
- Brevistachys L. Lombard & Crous (5)
- Capitofimbria L. Lombard & Crous (1)
- Cymostachys L. Lombard & Crous (3)
- Didymostilbe Henn. (14)
- Digitiseta Gordillo & Decock (4)
- Dimorphiseta L. Lombard & Crous(1)
- Globobotrys L. Lombard & Crous (1)
- Grandibotrys L. Lombard & Crous (3)
- Gregatothecium L. Lombard & Crous (1)
- Hyalinostachys C.G. Lin & K.D. Hyde (1)
- Inaequalispora L. Lombard & Crous (3)
- Kastanostachys L. Lombard & Crous (1)
- Koorchalomella Chona, Munjal & J.N. Kapoor (2)
- Melanopsamma Niessl (ca. 5)
- Memnoniella Höhn. (9)
- Myrothecium Tode (2)
- Myxospora L. Lombard & Crous (6)
- Neomyrothecium L. Lombard & Crous (1)
- Paramyrothecium L. Lombard & Crous (14)
- Parasarcopodium Melnik, S.J. Lee & Crous (3)
- Parvothecium L. Lombard & Crous (2)
- Peethambara Subram. & Bhat (1)
- Pseudoornatispora Tibpromma & K.D. Hyde (1)
- Septomyrothecium Matsush. (4)
- Sirastachys L. Lombard & Crous (9)
- Smaragdiniseta L. Lombard & Crous (1)
- Stachybotrys Corda
- Striatibotrys L. Lombard & Crous (7)
- Striaticonidium L. Lombard & Crous (5)
- Tangerinosporium L. Lombard & Crous (1)
- Virgatospora Finley (2)
- Xenomyrothecium L. Lombard & Crous (1)
- Xepicula Nag Raj (4)
- Xepiculopsis Nag Raj (2)

Note; for Stachybotrys Corda, 12 species have been phylogenetically studied although 81 epithets remain be studied.
