= Satratoxin-H =

Names
- IUPAC name (2'R,4E,9R,10E,12Z,16R,16aS,18R,19aR,23aR,25R)-6,7,16,16a,19a,22- hexahydro-25-hydroxy-9-((1S)-1-hydroxyethyl)-16a,21-dimethyl-spiro(5,9,16,18-dimethano- 1H,3H,23H-(1,6,12)trioxacyclooctadecino(3,4-d)(1)benzopyran-17(18H)-2'-oxirane)- 3,14(9H)-dione

Identifiers
CAS Number	53126-64-0
3D model (JSmol)	Interactive image
ChemSpider	16736977
PubChem CID	6438478
CompTox Dashboard (EPA)	DTXSID10891845
- InChI: InChI=1S/C29H36O9/c1-17-7-10-27-15-34-24(32)13-19-8-11-35-28(18(2)30,25(19)33)9-5-4-6-23(31)38-20-14-22(37-21(27)12-17)29(16-36-29)26(20,27)3/h4-6,9,12-13,18,20-22,25,30,33H,7-8,10-11,14-16H2,1-3H3/b6-4-,9-5+,19-13+/t18-,20+,21+,22+,25+,26+,27+,28+,29+/m0/s1 Key: MUACSCLQRGEGOE-PQGPUMQGSA-N; InChI=1/C29H36O9/c1-17-7-10-27-15-34-24(32)13-19-8-11-35-28(18(2)30,25(19)33)9-5-4-6-23(31)38-20-14-22(37-21(27)12-17)29(16-36-29)26(20,27)3/h4-6,9,12-13,18,20-22,25,30,33H,7-8,10-11,14-16H2,1-3H3/b6-4-,9-5+,19-13+/t18-,20+,21+,22+,25+,26+,27+,28+,29+/m0/s1 Key: MUACSCLQRGEGOE-PQGPUMQGBS
- SMILES: C[C@H](O)[C@@]12\C=C\C=C/C(=O)O[C@@H]4C[C@H]6O[C@@H]3/C=C(/C)CC[C@]3(COC(=O)/C=C(\CCO1)[C@H]2O)[C@]4(C)[C@]56CO5

Properties
Chemical formula	C_{29}H_{36}O_{9}
Molar mass	528.591
Solubility in water	insoluble

Hazards
- Occupational safety and health (OHS/OSH)
Main hazards	Highly toxic
- GHS labelling
Pictograms	(GHS06: Toxic)
- Except where otherwise noted, data are given for materials in their standard state (at 25 °C [77 °F], 100 kPa). verify (what is ?) Infobox references

Satratoxin-H, a trichothecene mycotoxin, is a naturally occurring toxin produced by the ascomycetes Stachybotrys chartarum and Trichoderma cornu-damae which is highly toxic and potentially fatal to humans and other animals. The clinical condition it causes is known as Stachybotrotoxicosis. It is related to the mycotoxin T-2, but unlike T-2 has not been reported to have been used as a chemical weapon.

== Properties ==
Satratoxin-H is almost completely insoluble in water, but is easily soluble in lower alcohols and polar solvents such as ethanol, methanol, 2-propanol, acetone and chloroform.

Satratoxin-H is not officially classified as a chemical weapon.

== Effects ==
Satratoxin-H is extremely versatile. Contact with the solution through ingestion, inhalation, or even prolonged physical contact produces symptoms similar to those listed below.

- a rash that becomes a moist dermatitis
- nosebleeds
- chest pain
- pulmonary hemorrhage (bleeding in the lungs)
- fever
- headache
- fatigue

However, if consumed in large quantities, it can be lethal. Satratoxin-H has little effect on bare skin, and does not blister it in the way many chemical weapons do. However, upon contact with sensitive surfaces (eyes, interior of mouth or nose), inflammation will occur.

Satratoxin-H has an LD_{50} for mice of 1.0-1.4 mg/kg, upon injection. Otherwise it is reported to be about five times as toxic as T-2.
