= Verrucarin A =

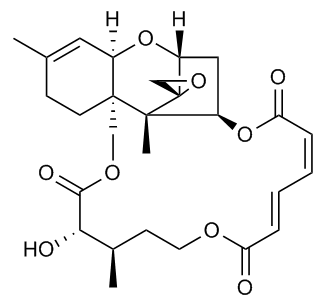

Names
- Other names Muconomycin A

Identifiers
CAS Number	3148-09-2
3D model (JSmol)	Interactive image
ChEBI	CHEBI:230243
ChEMBL	ChEMBL136985
ChemSpider	10210056
ECHA InfoCard	100.164.324
EC Number	636-535-7
KEGG	C09746
PubChem CID	6326658
UNII	OL62X66O4I
CompTox Dashboard (EPA)	DTXSID101017607
- InChI: InChI=1S/C27H34O9/c1-16-8-10-26-14-33-24(31)23(30)17(2)9-11-32-21(28)6-4-5-7-22(29)36-18-13-20(35-19(26)12-16)27(15-34-27)25(18,26)3/h4-7,12,17-20,23,30H,8-11,13-15H2,1-3H3/b6-4+,7-5-/t17-,18-,19-,20-,23+,25-,26-,27+/m1/s1 Key: NLUGUZJQJYVUHS-IDXDZYHTSA-N
- SMILES: C[C@@H]1CCOC(=O)/C=C/C=C\C(=O)O[C@@H]2C[C@@H]3[C@]4([C@]2([C@]5(CCC(=C[C@H]5O3)C)COC(=O)[C@H]1O)C)CO4

Properties
Chemical formula	C_{27}H_{34}O_{9}
Molar mass	502.560 g·mol^{−1}

Related compounds
Related compounds	Roridin E
- Except where otherwise noted, data are given for materials in their standard state (at 25 °C [77 °F], 100 kPa). Infobox references

Verrucarin A is a chemical compound that belongs in the class of trichothecenes, a group of sesquiterpene toxins produced by several fungi, namely from the Fusarium species, that are responsible for infecting food grains. It was first described in 1962. Within the skeleton of the basic trichothecene structure, the olefin and epoxide are crucial for toxicity; ester functionalities and hydroxyl groups often contribute to the toxicity, thereby rendering verrucarin A as one of the most lethal examples. The mechanism of action for this class of toxins mainly inhibits protein biosynthesis by preventing peptidyl transferase activity. Although initially thought to be potentially useful as anticancer therapeutics, numerous examples of trichothecene derivatives were shown to be too toxic for clinical use.

== Biosynthesis ==
Verrucarin A is classified as a type D trichothecene based on its substitution pattern in the 12,13-epoxytrichothec-9-ene (EPT) core structure. Type D differs from types A, B and C by containing an additional ring linking the C-4 and C-15 position. Trichothecenes are generally formed via the mevalonate pathway beginning with the precursor farnesyl pyrophosphate (FPP). After cyclization of FPP to form trichodiene, TRI4 encodes a cytochrome P450 enzyme to catalyze a series of oxygenation events. Upon the addition of three oxygens at C-2, C-11 and the C-12,13 epoxide, the intermediate isotrichodiol is formed. Isotrichodiol then isomerizes, yielding the tricothecane EPT core structure. Subsequently, it is proposed that a series of hydroxylations and acylations occur at C-15 and C-4 which then cyclize at these carbons.

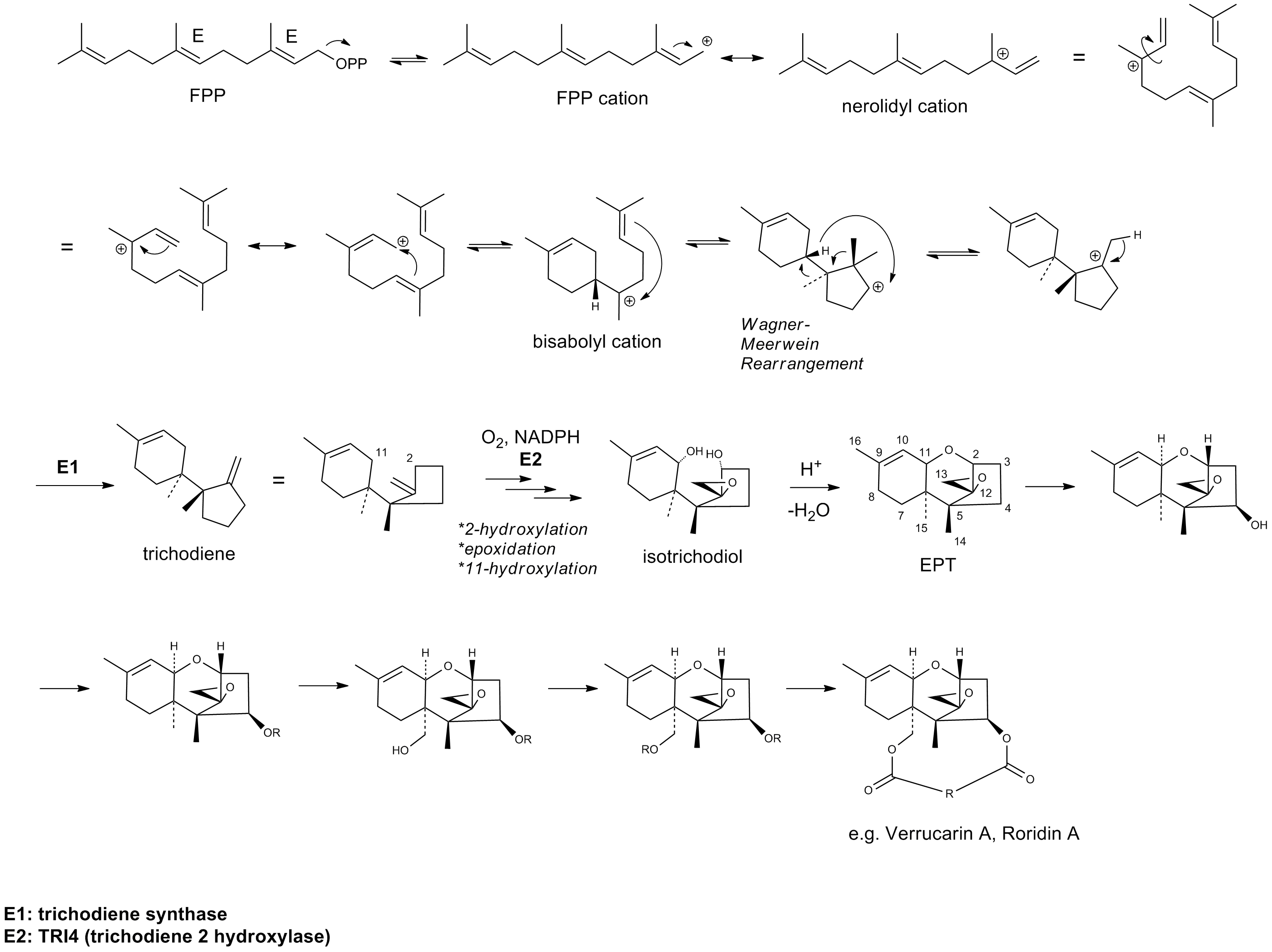
