= Sick building syndrome =

Symptoms of illness attributed to a building

- Specialty: Environmental medicine, immunology

Sick building syndrome (SBS) is a condition in which people develop symptoms of illness or become infected with chronic disease from the building in which they work or reside. In scientific literature, SBS is also known as building-related illness (BRI), building-related symptoms (BRS), or idiopathic environmental intolerance (IEI).

The main identifying observation is an increased incidence of complaints of such symptoms as headache, eye, nose, and throat irritation, fatigue, dizziness, and nausea. The 1989 Oxford English Dictionary defines SBS in that way. The World Health Organization created a 484-page tome on indoor air quality in 1984, when SBS was attributed only to non-organic causes, and suggested that the book might form a basis for legislation or litigation.

The outbreaks may or may not be a direct result of inadequate or inappropriate cleaning. SBS has also been used to describe staff concerns in post-war buildings with faulty building aerodynamics, construction materials, construction process, and maintenance. Some symptoms tend to increase in severity with the time people spend in the building, often improving or even disappearing when people are away from the building. The term SBS is also used interchangeably with "building-related symptoms", which orients the name of the condition around patients' symptoms rather than a "sick" building.

Attempts have been made to connect sick building syndrome to various causes, such as contaminants produced by outgassing of some building materials, volatile organic compounds (VOC), improper exhaust ventilation of ozone (produced by the operation of some office machines), light industrial chemicals used within, and insufficient fresh-air intake or air filtration (see "Minimum efficiency reporting value"). Sick building syndrome has also been attributed to heating, ventilation, and air conditioning (HVAC) systems, an attribution about which there are inconsistent findings.

== Signs and symptoms ==
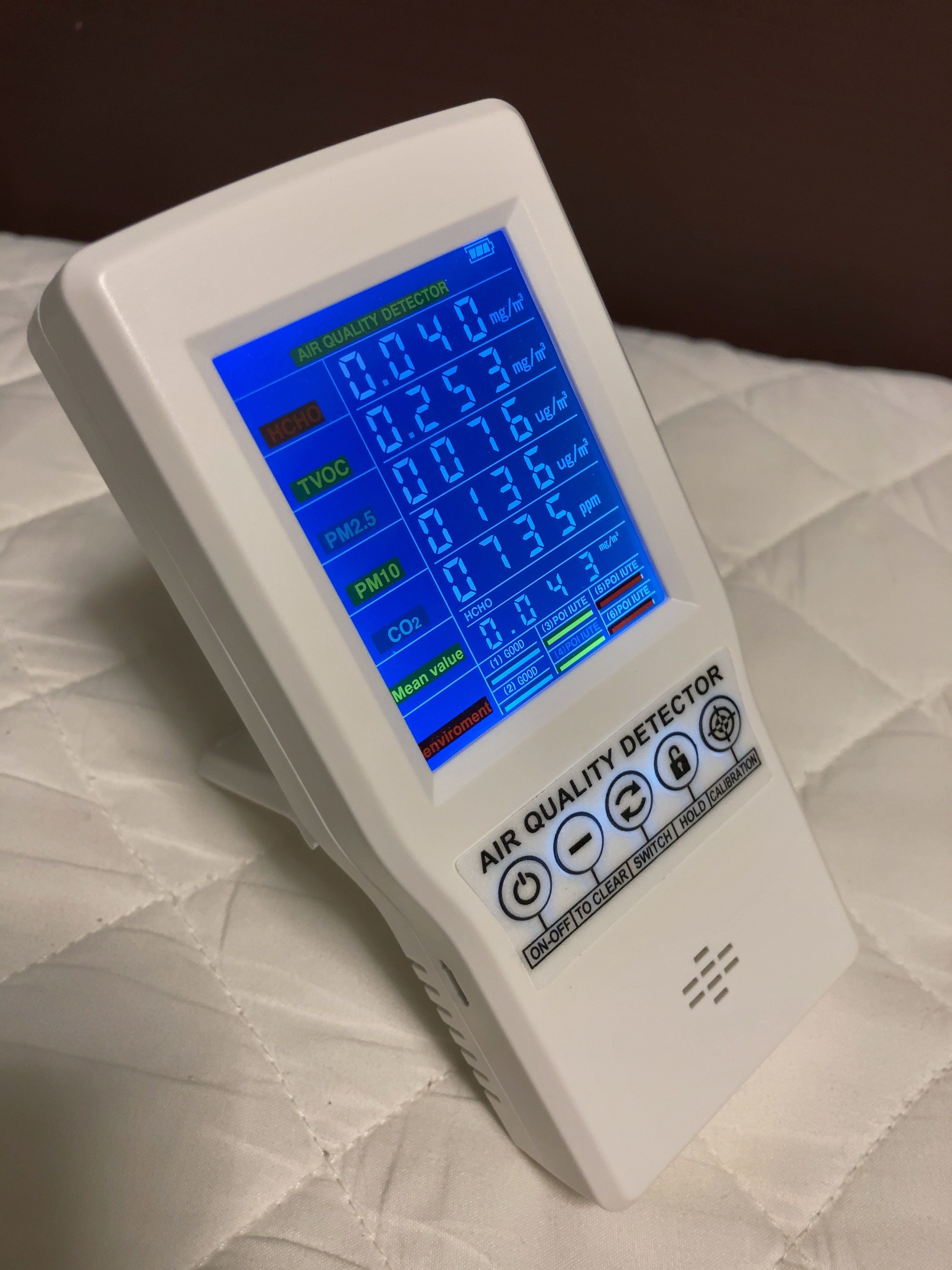
An air quality monitor

Human exposure to aerosols has a variety of adverse health effects. Building occupants complain of symptoms such as sensory irritation of the eyes, nose, or throat, neurotoxic or general health problems, skin irritation, nonspecific hypersensitivity reactions, infectious diseases, and odor and taste sensations. Poor lighting has caused general malaise.

Extrinsic allergic alveolitis has been associated with the presence of fungi and bacteria in the moist air of residential houses and commercial offices. A study in 2017 correlated several inflammatory diseases of the respiratory tract with objective evidence of damp-caused damage in homes.

The WHO has classified the reported symptoms into broad categories, including mucous-membrane irritation (eye, nose, and throat irritation), neurotoxic effects (headaches, fatigue, and irritability), asthma and asthma-like symptoms (chest tightness and wheezing), skin dryness and irritation, and gastrointestinal complaints.

Several sick occupants may report individual symptoms that do not seem connected. The key to discovery is the increased incidence of illnesses in general with onset or exacerbation in a short period, usually weeks. In most cases, SBS symptoms are relieved soon after the occupants leave the particular room or zone. However, there can be lingering effects of various neurotoxins, which may not clear up when the occupant leaves the building. In some cases, including those of sensitive people, there are long-term health effects.

== Cause ==
ASHRAE has recognized that polluted urban air, designated within the United States Environmental Protection Agency (EPA)'s air quality ratings as unacceptable, requires the installation of treatment such as filtration for which the HVAC practitioners generally apply carbon-impregnated filters and their likes. Different toxins will aggravate the human body in different ways. Some people are more allergic to mold, while others are highly sensitive to dust. Inadequate ventilation will exaggerate small problems (such as deteriorating fiberglass insulation or cooking fumes) into a much more serious indoor air quality problem.

Common products such as paint, insulation, rigid foam, particle board, plywood, duct liners, exhaust fumes and other chemical contaminants from indoor or outdoor sources, and biological contaminants can be trapped inside by the HVAC system. As this air is recycled using fan coils the overall oxygenation ratio drops and becomes harmful. When combined with other stress factors such as traffic noise and poor lighting, inhabitants of buildings located in a polluted urban area can quickly become ill as their immune system is overwhelmed.

Certain VOCs, considered toxic chemical contaminants to humans, are used as adhesives in many common building construction products. These aromatic carbon rings / VOCs can cause acute and chronic health effects in the occupants of a building, including cancer, paralysis, lung failure, and others. Bacterial spores, fungal spores, mold spores, pollen, and viruses are types of biological contaminants and can all cause allergic reactions or illness described as SBS. In addition, pollution from outdoors, such as motor vehicle exhaust, can enter buildings, worsen indoor air quality, and increase the indoor concentration of carbon monoxide and carbon dioxide. Adult SBS symptoms were associated with a history of allergic rhinitis, eczema, and asthma.

A 2015 study concerning the association of SBS and indoor air pollutants in office buildings in Iran found that, as carbon dioxide increased in a building, nausea, headaches, nasal irritation, dyspnea, and throat dryness also rose. Some work conditions have been correlated with specific symptoms: brighter light, for example was significantly related to skin dryness, eye pain, and malaise. Higher temperature is correlated with sneezing, skin redness, itchy eyes, and headache; lower relative humidity has been associated with sneezing, skin redness, and eye pain.

In 1973, in response to the oil crisis and conservation concerns, ASHRAE Standards 62-73 and 62-81 reduced required ventilation from 10 cubic feet per minute (4.7 L/s) per person to 5 cubic feet per minute (2.4 L/s) per person, but this was found to contribute to sick building syndrome. As of the 2016 revision, ASHRAE ventilation standards call for 5 to 10 cubic feet per minute of ventilation per occupant (depending on the occupancy type) in addition to ventilation based on the zone floor area delivered to the breathing zone.

=== Workplace ===
Excessive work stress or dissatisfaction, poor interpersonal relationships, and poor communication are often seen to be associated with SBS, recent studies show that a combination of environmental sensitivity and stress can greatly contribute to sick building syndrome.

Greater effects were found with features of the psycho-social work environment including high job demands and low support. The report concluded that the physical environment of office buildings appears to be less important than features of the psycho-social work environment in explaining differences in the prevalence of symptoms. However, there is still a relationship between sick building syndrome and symptoms of workers regardless of workplace stress.

Specific work-related stressors are related with specific SBS symptoms. Workload and work conflict are significantly associated with general symptoms (headache, abnormal tiredness, sensation of cold, or nausea). While crowded workspaces and low work satisfaction are associated with upper respiratory symptoms. Work productivity has been associated with ventilation rates, a contributing factor to SBS, and there's a significant increase in production as ventilation rates increase, by 1.7% for every two-fold increase of ventilation rate. Printer effluent, released into the office air as ultra-fine particles (UFPs) as toner is burned during the printing process, may lead to certain SBS symptoms. Printer effluent may contain a variety of toxins to which a subset of office workers are sensitive, triggering SBS symptoms.

Specific careers are also associated with specific SBS symptoms. Transport, communication, healthcare, and social workers have highest prevalence of general symptoms. Skin symptoms such as eczema, itching, and rashes on hands and face are associated with technical work. Forestry, agriculture, and sales workers have the lowest rates of sick building syndrome symptoms.

From the assessment done by Fisk and Mudarri, 21% of asthma cases in the United States were caused by wet environments with mold that exist in all indoor environments, such as schools, office buildings, houses, and apartments. Fisk and Berkeley Laboratory colleagues also found that the exposure to the mold increases the chances of respiratory issues by 30 to 50 percent. Additionally, studies showing that health effects with dampness and mold in indoor environments found that increased risk of adverse health effects occurs with dampness or visible mold environments.

Milton et al. determined the cost of sick leave specific for one business was an estimated $480 per employee, and about five days of sick leave per year could be attributed to low ventilation rates. When comparing low ventilation rate areas of the building to higher ventilation rate areas, the relative risk of short-term sick leave was 1.53 times greater in the low ventilation areas.

=== Home ===
Sick building syndrome can be caused by one's home. Laminate flooring may release more SBS-causing chemicals than do stone, tile, and concrete floors. Recent redecorating and new furnishings within the last year are associated with increased symptoms; so are dampness and related factors, having pets, and cockroaches. Mosquitoes are related to more symptoms, but it is unclear whether the immediate cause of the symptoms is the mosquitoes or the repellents used against them.

==== Mold ====
Sick building syndrome may be associated with indoor mold or mycotoxin contamination. However, the attribution of sick building syndrome to mold is controversial and supported by little evidence.

=== Indoor temperature ===
Indoor temperature under 18 °C (64 °F) has been shown to be associated with increased respiratory and cardiovascular diseases, increased blood pressure levels, and increased hospitalization.

== Diagnosis ==
While sick building syndrome (SBS) encompasses a multitude of non-specific symptoms, building-related illness (BRI) comprises specific, diagnosable symptoms caused by certain agents (chemicals, bacteria, fungi, etc.). These can typically be identified, measured, and quantified. There are usually four causal agents in BRi: immunologic, infectious, toxic, and irritant. For instance, Legionnaires' disease, usually caused by Legionella pneumophila, involves a specific organism which could be tested for.

== Prevention ==
- Reduction of time spent in the building
- If living in the building, moving to a new place
- Fixing any deteriorated paint or concrete deterioration
- Regular inspections to indicate for presence of mold or other toxins
- Adequate maintenance of all building mechanical systems
- Toxin-absorbing plants, such as sansevieria
- Roof shingle non-pressure cleaning for removal of algae, mold, and Gloeocapsa magma
- Using ozone to eliminate the many sources, such as VOCs, molds, mildews, bacteria, viruses, and even odors. However, numerous studies identify high-ozone shock treatment as ineffective despite commercial popularity and popular belief.
- Replacement of water-stained ceiling tiles and carpeting
- Only using paints, adhesives, solvents, and pesticides in well-ventilated areas or only using these pollutant sources during periods of non-occupancy
- Increasing the number of air changes per hour; the American Society of Heating, Refrigeration and Air-Conditioning Engineers recommend a minimum of 8.4 air exchanges per 24-hour period
- Increased ventilation rates that are above the minimum guidelines
- Proper and frequent maintenance of HVAC systems
- UV-C light in the HVAC plenum
- Installation of HVAC air cleaning systems or devices to remove VOCs and bioeffluents (people odors)
- Central vacuums that completely remove all particles from the house including the ultrafine particles (UFPs) which are less than 0.1 μm
- Regular vacuuming with a HEPA filter vacuum cleaner to collect and retain 99.97% of particles down to and including 0.3 micrometers
- Placing bedding in sunshine, which is related to a study done in a high-humidity area where damp bedding was common and associated with SBS
- Lighting in the workplace should be designed to give individuals control, and be natural when possible
- Relocating office printers outside the air conditioning boundary, perhaps to another building
- Replacing current office printers with lower emission rate printers
- Identification and removal of products containing harmful ingredients

== Management ==
SBS, as a non-specific blanket term, does not have any specific cause or cure. Any known cure would be associated with the specific eventual disease that was caused by exposure to known contaminants. In all cases, alleviation consists of removing the affected person from the building associated. BRI, on the other hand, utilizes treatment appropriate for the contaminant identified within the building (e.g., antibiotics for Legionnaires' disease).

Improving the indoor air quality (IAQ) of a particular building can attenuate, or even eliminate, the continued exposure to toxins. However, a Cochrane review of 12 mold and dampness remediation studies in private homes, workplaces, and schools by two independent authors were deemed to be very low to moderate quality of evidence in reducing adult asthma symptoms and results were inconsistent among children. For the individual, the recovery may be a process involved with targeting the acute symptoms of a specific illness, as in the case of mold toxins. Treating various building-related illnesses is vital to the overall understanding of SBS. Careful analysis by certified building professionals and physicians can help to identify the exact cause of the BRI, and help to illustrate a causal path to infection. With this knowledge one can, theoretically, remediate a building of contaminants and rebuild the structure with new materials. Office BRI may more likely than not be explained by three events: "Wide range in the threshold of response in any population (susceptibility), a spectrum of response to any given agent, or variability in exposure within large office buildings."

Isolating any one of the three aspects of office BRI can be a great challenge, which is why those who find themselves with BRI should take three steps, history, examinations, and interventions. History describes the action of continually monitoring and recording the health of workers experiencing BRI, as well as obtaining records of previous building alterations or related activity. Examinations go hand in hand with monitoring employee health. This step is done by physically examining the entire workspace and evaluating possible threats to health status among employees. Interventions follow accordingly based on the results of the Examination and History report.

== Epidemiology ==
Some studies have found that women have higher reports of SBS symptoms than men. It is not entirely clear, however, if this is due to biological, social, or occupational factors.

A 2001 study published in the Journal Indoor Air, gathered 1464 office-working participants to increase the scientific understanding of gender differences under the Sick Building Syndrome phenomenon. Using questionnaires, ergonomic investigations, building evaluations, as well as physical, biological, and chemical variables, the investigators obtained results that compare with past studies of SBS and gender. The study team found that across most test variables, prevalence rates were different in most areas, but there was also a deep stratification of working conditions between genders as well. For example, men's workplaces tend to be significantly larger and have all-around better job characteristics. Secondly, there was a noticeable difference in reporting rates, specifically that women have higher rates of reporting roughly 20% higher than men. This information was similar to that found in previous studies, thus indicating a potential difference in willingness to report.

There might be a gender difference in reporting rates of sick building syndrome, because women tend to report more symptoms than men do. Along with this, some studies have found that women have a more responsive immune system and are more prone to mucosal dryness and facial erythema. Also, women are alleged by some to be more exposed to indoor environmental factors because they have a greater tendency to have clerical jobs, wherein they are exposed to unique office equipment and materials (example: blueprint machines, toner-based printers), whereas men often have jobs based outside of offices.

== History ==
In the late 1970s, it was noted that nonspecific symptoms were reported by tenants in newly constructed homes, offices, and nurseries. In media it was called "office illness". The term "sick building syndrome" was coined by the WHO in 1986, when they also estimated that 10–30% of newly built office buildings in the West had indoor air problems. Early Danish and British studies reported symptoms.

Poor indoor environments attracted attention. The Swedish allergy study (SOU 1989:76) designated "sick building" as a cause of the allergy epidemic as was feared. In the 1990s, therefore, extensive research into "sick building" was carried out. Various physical and chemical factors in the buildings were examined on a broad front.

The problem was highlighted increasingly in media and was described as a "ticking time bomb". Many studies were performed in individual buildings.

In the 1990s "sick buildings" were contrasted against "healthy buildings". The chemical contents of building materials were highlighted. Many building material manufacturers were actively working to gain control of the chemical content and to replace criticized additives. The ventilation industry advocated above all more well-functioning ventilation. Others perceived ecological construction, natural materials, and simple techniques as a solution.

At the end of the 1990s came an increased distrust of the concept of "sick building". A dissertation at the Karolinska Institute in Stockholm 1999 questioned the methodology of previous research, and a Danish study from 2005 showed these flaws experimentally. It was suggested that sick building syndrome was not really a coherent syndrome and was not a disease to be individually diagnosed, but a collection of as many as a dozen semi-related diseases. In 2006 the Swedish National Board of Health and Welfare recommended in the medical journal Läkartidningen that "sick building syndrome" should not be used as a clinical diagnosis. Thereafter, it has become increasingly less common to use terms such as sick buildings and sick building syndrome in research. However, the concept remains alive in popular culture and is used to designate the set of symptoms related to poor home or work environment engineering. Sick building is therefore an expression used especially in the context of workplace health.

Sick building syndrome made a rapid journey from media to courtroom where professional engineers and architects became named defendants and were represented by their respective professional practice insurers. Proceedings invariably relied on expert witnesses, medical and technical experts, building managers, contractors, and manufacturers of finishes and furnishings, testifying as to cause and effect. Most of these actions resulted in sealed settlement agreements, none of these being dramatic. The insurers needed a defense based upon Standards of Professional Practice to meet a court decision that declared that in a modern, essentially sealed building, the HVAC systems must produce breathing air for suitable human consumption. ASHRAE (American Society of Heating, Refrigeration and Air Conditioning Engineers, currently with over 50,000 international members) undertook the task of codifying its indoor air quality (IAQ) standard.

ASHRAE empirical research determined that "acceptability" was a function of outdoor (fresh air) ventilation rate and used carbon dioxide as an accurate measurement of occupant presence and activity. Building odors and contaminants would be suitably controlled by this dilution methodology. ASHRAE codified a level of 1,000 ppm of carbon dioxide and specified the use of widely available sense-and-control equipment to assure compliance. The 1989 issue of ASHRAE 62.1-1989 published the whys and wherefores and overrode the 1981 requirements that were aimed at a ventilation level of 5,000 ppm of carbon dioxide (the OSHA workplace limit), federally set to minimize HVAC system energy consumption. This apparently ended the SBS epidemic.

Over time, building materials changed with respect to emissions potential. Smoking vanished and dramatic improvements in ambient air quality, coupled with code compliant ventilation and maintenance, per ASHRAE standards have all contributed to the acceptability of the indoor air environment.

== See also ==
- Aerotoxic syndrome
- Air purifier
- Asthmagen
- Electromagnetic hypersensitivity
- Fan death
- Havana syndrome
- Healthy building
- Hospital-acquired infection
- Lead paint
- Multiple chemical sensitivity
- NASA Clean Air Study
- Particulates
- Renovation
- Somatic symptom disorder
