= List of judgments of the Supreme Court of the United Kingdom delivered in 2022 =

This is a list of the judgments given by the Supreme Court of the United Kingdom in the year 2022.

In 2022, Lord Reed of Allermuir was the President of the Supreme Court; Lord Hodge was the Deputy President.

The table lists judgments made by the court and the opinions of the judges in each case. Judges are treated as having concurred in another's judgment when they either formally attach themselves to the judgment of another or speak only to acknowledge their concurrence with one or more judges. Any judgment which reaches a conclusion which differs from the majority on one or more major points of the appeal has been treated as dissent.

All dates are for 2022 unless expressly stated otherwise.

== 2022 case summaries ==
Unless otherwise noted, cases were heard by a panel of 5 judges.

Cases involving Scots law are highlighted in orange. Cases involving Northern Irish law are highlighted in green.

Case name	Citation	Date	Legal subject	Summary of decision
FirstPort Property Services Ltd v Settlers Court RTM Company and others	[2022] UKSC 1	12 January 2022	Right to Manage, Commonhold and Leasehold Reform Act 2002,	The definition of the premises over which the tenants of a self contained block of flats had the right to manage under the Commonhold and Leasehold Reform Act 2002 did not include shared estate facilities which were also used by other blocks of flats. The court determined that such an extension of the definition of premises would result in outcomes that were "absurd and unworkable" as, amongst other things, it would result in the tenants of the other flats having shared estate facilities provided by a right to manage company in which those other tenants did not have a legal relationship.
PWR v Director of Public Prosecutions, Akdogan and another v Director of Public Prosecutions	[2022] UKSC 2	26 January 2022	Terrorism Act 2000, Article 10 of the European Convention on Human Rights	Two points were decided namely: Section 13(1) of the Terrorism Act 2000, which provides that it is a criminal offense for a person in a public place to carry or display an article "in such a way or in such circumstances as to arouse reasonable suspicion that he is a member or supporter of a proscribed organisation", creates a strict liability offence.; Such an offense is compatible with Article 10 of the European Convention on Human Rights (freedom of expression) as it is prescribed by law, pursues legitimate aims and is necessary and proportionate to the legal aim pursued.
R (on the application of O (a minor, by her litigation friend AO)) v Secretary of State for the Home Department; R (on the application of The Project for the Registration of Children as British Citizens) v Secretary of State for the Home Department	[2022] UKSC 3	2 February 2022	Ultra Vires, British Nationality Act 1981, Immigration Act 2014	Parliament had authorised in primary legislation the imposition by subordinate legislation of a fee for the registration of a minor as a British Citizen.
Public Prosecutors Office of the Athens Court of Appeal v O'Connor	[2022] UKSC 4	2 February 2022	Statutory Interpretation, Extradition Act 2003	Where a person's legal representative had stated orally in court that an appeal would be lodged against an extradition order this could not be attributed as an action of the person. As such the appeal to the previous judgement ordering the extradition was not valid as section 26(5) of the Extradition Act 2003 required that "the person did everything reasonably possible to ensure that the notice [of appeal] was given as soon as it could be given".
Bloomberg LP v ZXC	[2022] UKSC 5	16 February 2022	Misuse of private information, Article 8 of the European Convention on Human Rights, Article 10 of the European Convention on Human Rights	Two main issues were considered: A person under criminal investigation has, prior to being charged, a reasonable expectation of privacy in respect of information relating to that investigation.; The confidentiality of a confidential law enforcement letter received by Bloomberg was a relevant important factor and rendered the information private and prevented Bloomberg from publishing on the basis of public interest.
Craig v Her Majesty's Advocate (for the Government of the United States of America)	[2022] UKSC 6	23 February 2022	United Kingdom constitutional law, Scotland Act 1998, European Convention on Human Rights	The Lord Advocate (of Scotland) cannot order the extradition of a person if those acts would be incompatible with the persons rights under the European Convention on Human Rights. The failure by the Home Secretary to bring into force the forum bar provisions (Note: The forum bar provisions are intended to prevent extradition from taking place where the offences could be fairly and effectively tried in the UK and where it is not in the interest of justice for the person to be extradited.) in Scotland (having been brought into force in England, Wales and Northern Ireland) was unlawful. Therefore, the extradition procedure did not accord with the Crime and Courts Act 2013 and were incompatible with the individuals rights under Article 8 of the European Convention on Human Rights.
Croydon London Borough Council v Kalonga	[2022] UKSC 7	9 March 2022	English land law, Housing Act 1985	Two issued were decided: Where a fixed term secure tenancy had been granted by Croydon London Borough Council and the tenancy conditions had subsequently been breached (antisocial behaviour and rent arrears), the council could not terminate the tenancy unless there was specific provision in the agreement for early termination and the council had sought to rely on such provisions. (In the specific circumstances the council's claim failed as they had not sought to rely on such provisions).; An agreement that provided the council to seek an over for possession from the Court at any time if the tenant breached the terms of the agreement constituted a valid forfeiture clause.
Bott & Co Solicitors v Ryanair DAC	[2022] UKSC 8	16 March 2022	Equitable Lien	A firm of solicitors (Bott & Co) had an equitable lien over the compensation paid by Ryanair for passenger compensation claims for flight cancellations and delays where Ryanair were on notice that Bott & Co had been retained in resect of the claims. A change of policy by Ryanair from makings payments to Bott & Co (who previously then deducted their fee under the equitable lien) to making payments directly to the individuals and the fact that the claims were unlikely to be subject to litigation did not prevent Bott & Co from having an equitable lien (the consequence of which being that Bott & Co could pursue Ryanair for the fees due from the individuals). Decided by way of a 3–2 majority.
Commissioners for Her Majesty's Revenue and Customs v NCL Investments Ltd and another	[2022] UKSC 9	23 March 2022	UK Corporation Tax, Corporation Tax Act 2009	Accounting debits arising under International Financial Reporting Standard 2 (IFRS 2) were a deductible expense for the purpose of UK corporation tax. The court confirmed that: Such amounts were such that disregarding the debits would not be an adjustment required or authorised by law, Such amounts should not be disallowed as an expense that was not incurred wholly and exclusively for the purpose of the rate, Such amounts are not disallowed on the basis that they are capital in nature, Such amounts were not "held... under and employee benefit scheme" and therefore could not be subject to the specific disallowances in respect of employee benefit contributions. (Note: Note: Subsequent to the periods subject to this case statutory legislation was introduced from March 2013 to disallow the deduction of accounting debits under IFRS 2 or equivalent accounting standards)
Commissioners for Her Majesty's Revenue and Customs v Coal Staff Superannuation Scheme Trustees Ltd	[2022] UKSC 10	27 April 2022	EU Law, UK Tax Law,	The application of a deemed withholding tax on manufactured overseas dividends (Note: Manufactured overseas dividends are a concept under UK tax law in respect of returns made where a person (the lender) transfers the ownership of shares in a non-UK company to another person (the borrower) on terms such that the borrower repays the lending by way of the return of equivalent shares at the end of the lending person and the borrower receives a return that is economically equivalent to the dividends paid on the shares during the lending period.) on stock lending arrangements was not contrary to Article 63 of the Treaty on the Functioning of the European Union. As the counterparty borrowers to stock lending arrangements typically had sufficient withholding tax credits to fully offset on any deemed withholding tax on manufactured overseas dividends, the withholding tax could not be considered to discourage investment in foreign shares relative to UK shares by tax-exempt investors.
R (on the application of Coughlan) v Minister for the Cabinet Office	[2022] UKSC 11	27 April 2022	Voter identification laws, Representation of the People Act 2000	Two main points were determined: Pilot schemes that authorised changes to the rules set out in secondary legislation governing UK local elections namely to include a requirement for voter identification in those elections were not ultra vires. In particular, the Representation of the People Act 2000 specifically enables the Minister for the Cabinet Office to provide for such schemes.; Such pilot schemes were authorised for a lawful purposes to enable the gathering of information to assist in the modernistation of electoral procedures.
Zipvit Ltd v Commissioners for Her Majesty's Revenue and Customs	[2022] UKSC 12	11 May 2022	UK Tax Law, Value Added Tax	Judgment following a referral to the Court of Justice of the European Union (Note: Judgement of the CJEU released on 13 January 2022 with case reference C-156/20) (CJEU) in a previous supreme court case (see 2020 UKSC 15). The CJEU had confirmed that a trader could not recover VAT on supplies made to it where the original supplier and HMRC had mistakenly treated the original supplies as exempt from VAT as the VAT in question had not been 'due or paid'. The decision of the CJEU was affirmed by the supreme court by dismissing the taxpayers appeal.
R v Maughan	[2022] UKSC 13	18 May 2022	Criminal Law	Two matters in respect of sentencing policies were decided by the court: The term 'proceedings' in Article 33 of the Criminal Justice (Northern Ireland) Order 1996, which provides that the court shall, in determining the appropriate sentence, take into account the 'stage in proceedings' at which a defendant indicates their intention to plead guilty, did not include the investigative process prior to a charge or issue of summons being made. However, this did not prevent the courts from adopting a sentencing policy which treats as relevant the failure to admit wrongdoing during interview and therefore made no error of law.; The purpose of discount for guilty pleads is to obtain the utilitarian benefits of saving time, cost, and providing reassurance for witnesses and victims. Where an offender is caught red handed they may have little choice other than to plead guilty and may not deserve the same level of discount as in other cases.
Competition and Markets Authority v Flynn Pharma Ltd; Competition and Markets Authority v Pfizer Inc	[2022] UKSC 14	25 May 2022	Costs in English law	There is no generally applicable principle to provide that all public bodies should enjoy a protected costs position when they lose a case which they have brought or defended in the exercise of their public functions. A factor that should be considered in awarding costs in such circumstances is the risk that there will be a "chilling effect" on the conduct of the public body, and its ability to act in the public interest, where awards of costs are routinely made against it. This assessment is likely to be best made by the relevant court of tribunal in question, in this case the Competition Appeal Tribunal, who had acted reasonably in applying a "costs following the event" starting point.
Secretary of State for the Home Department v SC	[2022] UKSC 15	15 June 2022	Immigration law, UK Borders Act 2007, Article 3 of the European Convention on Human Rights	The court had to consider a number of matters in respect of an individual who had, together with his mother been granted indefinite leave to remain in the UK as a result of his mother having been persecuted by gang members in Jamaica but had subsequently committed criminal offences which would qualify the individual for deportation under the UK Borders Act 2007. Due to the threats against the individual and protections given by Article 3 of the European Convention on Human Rights, the individual could only be deported to Jamaica if the individual could reasonable be expected to stay in the rural areas of Jamaica ("internal relocation"). In considering deportation the court determined that: The correct approach to whether internal relocation is possible requires a historical assessments of the individuals circumstances and should not include a value judgement of what is "due" to him as a criminal.; The First-tier Tribunal did not err in determining that the individual could not reasonably be expected to live in a rural area of Jamaica due to the medical requirements, family relationships and geographical relationships of the individual.; The First-tier Tribunal did not err in concluding that the individual was socially and culturally integrated in the UK as this is a fact sensitive judgement.; Where the public interest requested the deportation of a foreign criminal a full proportionality assessment was required to weigh any interference with their rights to family and private life under Article 8 of the European Convention on Human Rights.
AIC Ltd v Federal Airports Authority of Nigeria	[2022] UKSC 16	15 June 2022	Procedural law, Civil Procedure Rules	The court considered the discretion of a court to reconsider a judgement and order after it has been given but before the formal order has been sealed by the court. In such circumstances a judge faced with an application to reconsider is required to consider such an application in line with the overriding principle to deal with cases justly and at proportionate cost. However, significant weighting should be given to the finality principle, being that a judgement made is final, before a court should entertain reconsidering a judgement.
In the matter H-W (Children)	[2022] UKSC 17	15 June 2022	Children Act 1989	A care order, in this case a care order made in relation to three children which approved care plans for removal of the children into separate long term foster placements, must be necessary to meet the needs of the children having regard to the advantages and disadvantages of all options. In considering the specific case, the court found that the process adopted by judge who originally made the care orders was flawed as it did not adequately assess the prospects of various other options. The case was therefore remitted to the lower courts of a rehearing.
Cornerstone Telecommunications Infrastructure Ltd v Compton Beauchamp Estates Ltd; Cornerstone Telecommunications Infrastructure Ltd v Ashloch Ltd and another On Tower UK Ltd v AP Wireless II (UK) Ltd	[2022] UKSC 18	22 June 2022	Property Law, Landlord and Tenant Act 1954, Electronic Communications Code	The court was required to determine who is the 'occupier of the land' in circumstances where a telecommunicators operator has been granted 'code rights (Note: Being rights covered by paragraph 9 of the Electronic Communications Code as set under the Communications Act 2003)' which enabled them to install and operate network communications apparatus on land which is not owned by the telecommunications operator. The court found that the term must be given effect by reference to the intention of the Electronic Communications Code and therefore the occupier and operator at not one and the same and therefore an operator is not prevented from obtaining additional code rights in respect of the same land on which it already holds code rights.
Hastings v Finsbury Orthopaedics Ltd and another	[2022] UKSC 19	29 June 2022	Consumer Protection Act 1987	A metal on metal prosthetic hip was found not to be defective in law. In considering whether the prosthetic hip was defective the court made the following key findings: The nature of a product may be such that there can be no entitlement to an absolute guarantee of safety, Generalised expressions of professional concern regarding a type of project (in this case metal on metal prosthesis) does not mean that a specific product is defective provided the product would not be worse when measured against existing equivalent products, The removal of a product from the market for commercial reasons does not necessarily support that a product is defective,
Basfar v Wong	[2022] UKSC 20	6 July 2022	Employment law, human trafficking, modern slavery, diplomatic immunity, Vienna Convention on Diplomatic Relations	A Saudi Arabian diplomat who allegedly subjected a domestic staff member to conditions that would constitute modern slavery cannot rely on diplomatic immunity to prevent claims for compensation. In a majority opinion the court held that the exploitation of a domestic worker for the profit of a diplomat would constitute a 'commercial activity' and therefore would fall within once of the exemptions from immunity under the Vienna Convention on Diplomatic Relations.
Harpur Trust v Brazel	[2022] UKSC 21	20 July 2022	Employment law, Working Time Directive 2003	Employees who only work for part of a given year (in this case a teacher who is only contracted to work during term time) are entitled to holiday pay on the same basis as employees who work all year.
