= Ground rent =

Rent for the ground where a tenant can do property development

As a legal term, ground rent specifically refers to regular payments made by a holder of a leasehold property to the freeholder or a superior leaseholder, as required under a lease. In this sense, a ground rent is created when a freehold piece of land is sold on a long lease or leases. The ground rent provides an income for the landowner. In economics, ground rent is a form of economic rent meaning all value accruing to titleholders as a result of the exclusive ownership of title privilege to location.

== History ==
In Roman law, ground rent (solarium) was an annual rent payable by the lessee of a superficies (a piece of land), or perpetual lease of building land. In early Norman England, tenants could lease their title to land so that the land-owning lords did not have any power over the sub-tenant to collect taxes. In 1290 King Edward I passed the Statute of Quia Emptores that prevented tenants from leasing their lands to others through subinfeudation. This created a system of substitution, where the tenant's full interest would be transferred to the purchaser or donee, who would pay a rentcharge. This system later passed into common law in England and was adopted by many nations which trace their legal heritage to England.

Classical economists and Georgists quantify ground rent to investigate and capture unearned income called economic rent, as distinct from income derived from labour.

== Valuation ==
The value of the freehold interest comprises:

- A multiple of the current annual ground rent payable, which will depend on
  - the outstanding term of the lease
  - any future scheduled increases in the level of ground rent
  - market interest rates
  - the probability of default
  - if the rents for individual flats etc. are small, the cost of collection
- The net present value of the reversion, i.e. at the end of the lease the freeholder (to whom the rent is paid) will probably be fully entitled to the property, so the shorter the lease the greater the reversion value.
- Any attributable "marriage value" (a substantial sum designed to compensate freeholders for their loss of interest when a lease with less than 80 years to run is extended).

In economics, ground rent means all economic value accruing to owners of land, regardless of whether payments are explicitly made or the rents are imputed. Various assessment methodologies are employed by real estate appraisers.

== United Kingdom ==
In the United Kingdom, the rights of residential tenants of property subject to a long lease at a ground rent are governed by the Leasehold Reform Act 1967 for houses and the Leasehold Reform, Housing and Urban Development Act 1993 for flats.

=== England and Wales ===
In English law, it appears that the term "ground rent" was at one time popularly used for the houses and lands out of which ground rents issue, as well as for the rents themselves. Lord Eldon observed in 1815 that the context in which the term occurred may materially vary its meaning.

The contemporary accepted meaning of ground rent is the rent at which land is let for the purpose of improvement by building: i.e. a rent charged in respect of the land only, and not in respect of the buildings to be placed on it. It is therefore usually lower than the rent that might be achieved for a building let on the open market, and is let for a longer term – at least 21 years, but more commonly 99 years, 125 years, or even 999 years. The benefit to the freeholder of this arrangement was that the freehold land owner would obtain possession of the improved land, i.e. the land with the building constructed upon it, on lease expiry. The given freeholder would likely be deceased by that time but land owners often considered benefit to future generations of their family in the era of a land owning class.

There was substantial residential development in the cities of the UK in the Victorian era, much of it on land acquired by developers from freehold land owners on ground leases. By the early 20th century the politics of property ownership was changing and there was a recognition that many working people were living in accommodation which they did not truly own, they had purchased a wasting asset and could lose their homes on expiry of the ground lease on it. Over that century various pieces of legislation were enacted to grant greater security of tenure to residential leaseholders by granting leaseholders the entitlement to extend their lease. Freeholders found that the reversion of the property to them was being pushed further into the future and this, allied with the rise in corporate property ownership requiring shorter term investment returns, led some freeholders to consider the ground rent itself a form of investment and in many cases sought to maximise it. In the second half of the century it became common to incorporate rent review provisions into ground leases and towards the end of the century some of these rent review provisions were designed to maintain or increase the real value of the rental stream and were considered onerous on leaseholders. A market in residential ground rent investments arose. By the close of the 20th century many housebuilders were selling properties on ground leases - even if there was no intrinsic reason to do so - in order to create an income stream which could be sold to investors, in addition to the sale of the property itself on a long lease.

The Commonhold and Leasehold Reform Act 2002 and associated regulations now govern the form of notice that needs to be issued to collect ground rent. Previously there had been a problem with some landlords sending confusing or dishonest demands for payments to tenants.

Under the terms of a lease agreement, the freeholder (the outright owner of the land or property) grants permission for a leaseholder to take possession of the property for a specified period of time. This could range from 21 years to 999 years, and during this time, the leaseholder will pay ground rent to the freeholder. Freeholders lease property primarily for the initial premium paid by the original leaseholder for granting the lease; but in addition ground rent (often a token amount) will be payable over a long term, and this may be an attractive fixed income investment for some types of investor. The final sanction available to a landlord faced with a leaseholder in breach of the lease due to the failure to pay the service charges, ground rent or administration charges, is to forfeit the lease and to repossess the house or flat. To do this the landlord must first serve a valid notice under section 146 of the Law of Property Act 1925 – a Notice of Seeking Possession. However, the landlord cannot serve a section 146 notice where the amount of service charges, administration charges or ground rent owed (or a combination of all of these) unless the unpaid amount is more than £350 or consists of, or includes, an amount that has been outstanding for more than three years.

There are a number of companies which specialise in buying ground rents for long-term investment from landlords who want to sell their ground rents. Normally they focus on purchasing reversionary ground rents, either for initial income or for the opportunity of a reversion of the underlying property at some point in the future. The value of ground rents is affected by the rent review pattern on future income increases, the value of the underlying property, the unexpired lease length, and whether marriage value is applicable.

Before selling ground rents, statute obliges the transactional parties to serve Section V notices on the long leaseholders. This gives them a two-month period in which to respond. Upon expiry of this, a transaction can proceed within 12 months at the price stated on the notice or higher. The only case in which such notices are irrelevant is for exchange of contracts on the sale and purchase of the ground rent of flats before 50% of them were sold. This then allows for the sum to pass and ground rent rights in return, even after all the flats are sold, without individual notices. However the rentcharge buyer is wise to note the pending contract on the freehold title.

Before 2003 the Land Registry recorded the ground rent, and the rent is evident from the register of title from their website. From 13 October 2003 the Land Registry no longer does so, and a more studied examination of the downloaded lease is needed.

==== Ground rent scandal ====
In the past, ground rent was usually not onerous, at typically around £100 per year, and often freeholders would not request payment. But in the 2010s, developers and builders often granted leases for new homes with ground rents as high as £1000 per annum, with escalation clauses doubling them every 5 or 10 years. This can result in immediate and/or subsequent mortgage refusals from lenders and their valuers, which makes the property sellable below the market price.

Leaseholders have a right after two years to extend a lease with less than 99 years to run and reduce ground rent to a "peppercorn", i.e. close to zero, but developers have thwarted this with costly leases of more than 150 years that make the valuation – based on the ground rent and term – beyond the reach of leaseholders, and sell the freehold – often before the development is finished – to exploitive offshore companies.

The English and Welsh "ground rent scandal" has been widely reported in the press. In 2016 MP Peter Bottomley described excessive ground rents as "legalised extortion". In response to questions raised by the MP, communities secretary Sajid Javid said: "We must make sure the kind of abuses he mentioned are stamped out and we will continue to do everything [we can]. We do work with a number of stakeholders and we can certainly see how we can do more."

In June 2018 the UK government announced that leasehold tenure would be reformed, with new long leases having zero ground rent. This promise was fulfilled with the Leasehold Reform (Ground Rent) Act 2022, which mostly prohibited ground rent greater than one peppercorn per year on new leases.

=== Scotland ===
In Scots law, the term 'ground rent' is not employed, but its place is taken, for practical purposes, by the ground annual, which bears a double meaning:

- At the time of the Reformation in Scotland, the lands of the Church were parcelled out by the Crown into various lordships, the grantees being called "Lords of Erection". In the 17th century these Lords of Erection resigned their superiorities to the Crown, with the exception of the feu-duties, which were to be retained until a price agreed upon for their redemption had been paid. This reserved power of redemption was, however, resigned by the crown on the eve of the Union and the feu-duties became payable in perpetuity to the Lords of Erection as a ground annual.
- Speculators in building ground usually granted sub-feus to builders at a high feu-duty. But where sub-feus were prohibited – they might have been prior to the Conveyancing (Scotland) Act 1874 – and there is much demand for building ground, the feuars frequently stipulated that the builder pay an annual rent rather than purchase the land outright. This annual rent is called a ground annual. Interest is not due on arrears of ground annuals and, like other real burdens, ground annuals could be freely assigned and conveyed.

Feu duty in Scotland was ended by the Abolition of Feudal Tenure etc. (Scotland) Act 2000.

=== Northern Ireland ===
Redemption of ground rents in Northern Ireland is covered by the Ground Rents Act (Northern Ireland) 2001.

== Republic of Ireland ==
In the Republic of Ireland ground rents have been a feature of urban life. While most tenancy reform legislation has been enacted for agricultural land (see Irish Land Acts), urban occupiers / tenants have been allowed to "buy out" their ground rents from landlords, and so effectively change a long lease into a freehold interest, most recently under the Landlord and Tenant (Ground Rents) (No. 2) Act 1978 and the Landlord and Tenant (Ground Rents) Act 2005. Notably, ground rents in Castlebar, County Mayo have been withheld following the controversial disappearance of Lord Lucan in 1974.

== Netherlands ==
Ground leases (erfpachten) are common in the Netherlands. However most Dutch municipalities (including Rotterdam, Den Bosch, Eindhoven, Haarlem, and Maastricht) are currently abandoning the system, and offering householders the right to buy their plot of land. Nonetheless, a number, including Amsterdam, are retaining ground leases, which ease comprehensive redevelopment, prevent land speculation and mean that the entire community benefits from any increase in value of the land.

On 1 July 2016 Amsterdam introduced the option of permanent ground leases as well as temporary and continuous ground leases. Householders had until 8 January 2020 to apply under advantageous terms to convert their ground lease to a perpetual basis, which means that it will indexed to inflation and will not rise unpredictably at the end of each term. Diemen, Hendrik-Ido-Ambacht, Utrecht and Vlaardingen (new rules in 2013) are also retaining ground rent.

The Hague introduced a new system of leasehold and ownership on 1 April 2008. Householders can purchase their land at 5% of 55% of the value of built-up land to convert their perpetual leasehold into ownership. For larger office buildings and industrial buildings over 100 m^{2} and areas that do not yet have a current use, the ground lease remains in force.

In the province of Groningen a variant survives in which there is an everlasting right of leasehold, the beklemrecht (right of oppression).

=== Law and mortgages ===
In the Netherlands, ground lease is regulated by Title 7 of Book 5 of the Dutch Civil Code.

In many cases, long-term leaseholds become qualified indexed loans, creating tax benefits.

Since 2010, banks have been applying stricter rules when providing mortgages on residential leasehold properties. Only new indefinite leases issued from 1 January 2013 are still eligible for a mortgage. These contracts must comply with the "Banking Directive on financing lease rights" of the Dutch Banking Association. Fixed-term contracts, for example 30 or 49 years, are excluded, while existing fixed-term contracts issued before 1 January 2013 are eligible for mortgage financing, provided the conditions meet the eligibility criteria of the Dutch Banking Association. Banks have decided to do this because they fear that the landowner will implement substantial increases, which will lead to payment problems for the leaseholder. Owners of leasehold properties wishing to sell their house are increasingly confronted with this restriction. The house appears to be unsaleable in many cases because new prospective buyers cannot get the financing.

== United States ==
The term 'ground rent' is applied in many U.S. states to a kind of tenure created by a grant in fee simple, the grantor reserving to himself and his heirs a certain rent, which is the interest in the money value of the land.

=== Maryland ===
The State of Maryland maintains provisions for ground rents, primarily in the Baltimore area. The practice dates back to the seventeenth century, when lesser lords and serfs paid crops and livestock to feudal lords to rent the lord's land. With ground rent, homeowners only own the building itself, but they must pay a small amount to rent the land itself from its owner. Under Maryland law, if ground rent is not paid on time, the ground owner can go to court and have a lien placed against the house, effectively seizing the home from the homeowner over a relatively small amount due, sometimes as little as $24. This occurred almost 4,000 times in Baltimore City from 2000 to 2005. In addition, properties with ground rent are usually valued about $10,000 less than comparable properties without ground rent.

In 2007, an emergency bill was presented by Democratic governor of Maryland Martin O'Malley to completely ban new ground rents and prevent ground owners from seizing houses from delinquent homeowners. The bill was passed by the legislature. Maryland state law required all ground owners to register the ownership of the land with the state by September 2008 or else the ground ownership is automatically extinguished. As of 2008, there were about 85,000 in Maryland. The new laws were contested in court for some ground owners, who called it an unconstitutional taking of property without fair compensation. In 2011, the law was ruled unconstitutional by the Maryland Court of Appeals, the state's highest court, to the extent that it purported to extinguish property rights of leaseholders. New ground rent leases can no longer be created after 22 January 2007, and ground rent owners must register their leases with the State Department of Assessments in order to collect rents or file a lien for unpaid rents (although failure to register no longer risks extinguishment of the property right).

=== New York ===
More than a hundred condominium and co-op buildings exist on leased land in New York City. Trump Plaza was leased from 1983 until 2015 when it was purchased by the co-op board for $190 million. The Stanhope, which converted to a co-op in 2005, has a lease agreement covering fixed rental terms lasting 150 years. Many leases date to the 1960s and 1970s, before the city became one of the world's most expensive real estate markets.

Apartments in land-lease buildings tend to cost "25 ... to 40 percent" less than comparable units in buildings on owned land, according to one New York City property broker, but their "perceived risk" may cause difficulty selling or financing them. Monthly costs include rent payments for the land, so they are significantly higher than fees in an owned building, and can rise sharply and unexpectedly if the land's value is reassessed during a real estate boom. Theoretically, the expiration of a land lease could even turn shareholders/owners to tenants and render their investments worthless.

=== Pennsylvania ===
Ground rents in the Commonwealth of Pennsylvania are considered real estate and, in cases of intestacy, go to the heirs. They are rent services and not rent charges, the statute Quia Emptores never having been in force in Pennsylvania, and are subject to all the incidents of such rents. The grantee of a ground rent may mortgage, sell, or otherwise dispose of the grant as he pleases, and while the rent is paid the land cannot be sold or the value of the improvements lost. The owner of land can occupy it, or can improve it and sell the improvements (such as structures), while retaining title to the land, and charge the buyer ground rent.

Since ground rent was a freehold estate, created by deed, and perpetual in duration, no presumption that it had been released could, at common law, arise from lapse of time. However, by statute (Act of 27 April 1855, s. 7), a presumption of release or extinguishment is created where no payment, claim, or demand has been made for the rent, nor any declaration or acknowledgment of its existence made or given by the owner of the premises subject to it, for a period of twenty-one years. Ground rents were formerly irredeemable after a certain time, but the creation of irredeemable ground rents is now forbidden (Pennsylvania Act 7 Assembly, 22 April 1850).

=== Virginia ===
The Commonwealth of Virginia permits residential ground rents, which are defined by statute:

"Residential ground rent" means a rent or charge paid for the use of land, whether or not title thereto is transferred to the user, or a lease of land, for personal residential purposes, (i) which is assignable by the obligor without the obligee's consent, (ii) which is for a term in excess of fifteen years, including any rights of renewal at the option of the obligor, (iii) where the obligor has a present or future right to terminate such ground rent and to acquire the entire interest of the obligee in the land by the payment of a determined or determinable amount, and (iv) where the obligee's interest in the land is primarily a security interest to protect his right to be paid the rent or charge.

(The obligor is the party obliged to pay, and the obligee the party entitled to receive, the ground rent.) The amount of a ground rent may be changed by either party once every five years, but, unless the parties agree otherwise, the amount of such a change may be no greater than the percentage change in the Consumer Price Index (or other standard prescribed by statute) during the previous three years. A ground rent constitutes a lien against the real estate. The terms of the ground rent agreement may be incorporated into the deed or other instrument of transfer, according to a statutory form.
