= Leasehold reform =

Leasehold reform may refer to one of the following UK Acts of Parliament:

- Leasehold Reform Act 1967
- Commonhold and Leasehold Reform Act 2002
- Leasehold Reform (Ground Rent) Act 2022
- Leasehold and Freehold Reform Act 2024
