= Bruton v London and Quadrant Housing Trust =

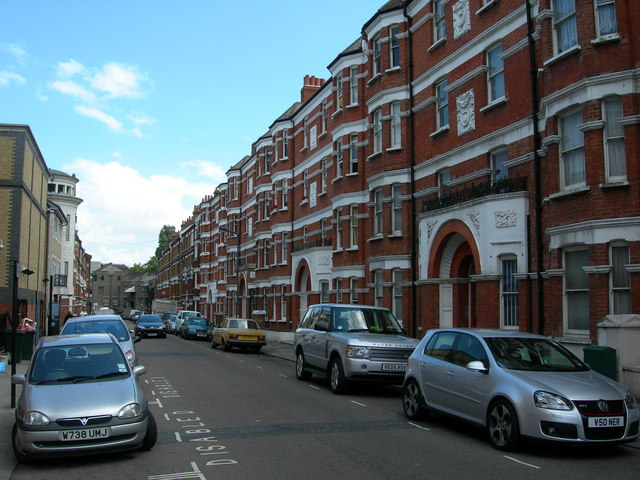
- Rushcroft Road, Brixton
- Court: House of Lords
- Decided: 24 June 1999
- Citations: [1999] UKHL 26, [2000] 1 AC 406, [1999] 3 WLR 150, [1999] 3 All ER 481
- Cases cited: Street v Mountford [1985] AC 809;
- Legislation cited: Emergency Powers (Defence) Act 1939; Housing Act 1985; Landlord and Tenant Act 1985; Law of Property Act 1925

Case history
- Subsequent action: Kay v Lambeth London Borough Council [2006] UKHL 10

Court membership
- Judges sitting: Lord Slynn of Hadley; Lord Jauncey of Tullichettle; Lord Hoffmann; Lord Hope of Craighead; Lord Hobhouse of Woodborough

Keywords
- Leases; Licenses; Possession of Land

Bruton v London and Quadrant Housing Trust [1999] UKHL 26 is an English land law case that examined the rights of a 'tenant' in a situation where the 'landlord', a charitable housing association had no authority to grant a tenancy, but in which the 'tenant' sought to enforce the duty to repair on the association implied under landlord and tenant statutes. The effect of the case is to create the relationship of de facto landlord (who does not own a property but houses an occupier in a specific room at a rent) and tenant between the parties.

== Facts ==
The council gave the London and Quadrant Housing Trust, a charitable association, a licence to use land to accommodate the homeless. For a place at Flat 2, Oval House, Rushcroft Road, in Brixton, London, Mr Bruton agreed with the trust to pay weekly rent for a flat. There was a provision that the council and LQHT had access to the property at limited times. Then he claimed he was a tenant, and the trust had an obligation to repair the flat under the Landlord and Tenant Act 1985 section 11. The Housing Trust argued that under orthodox property law principles, nemo dat quod non habet (literally meaning "no one gives what he does not have"), so because they had no lease, they could not grant a lease to Mr Bruton, and therefore they had no obligation to repair the property.

== Judgment ==
The House of Lords held the agreement did create a tenancy and the trust was therefore under an obligation to repair. Giving the leading judgment, Lord Hoffmann held it did not matter that the landlord did not have a property right in its title. Exclusive possession is the essence of a lease, and irrelevant that the agreement purported to be a licence. The term that Mr Bruton could be told to vacate on reasonable notice was ineffective, as one cannot contract out of statute. LQHT's lack of legal title was also irrelevant because the character of the agreement, not the nature of the landlord, was the key point for deciding whether a lease existed under the LTA 1985.

Did this agreement create a "lease" or "tenancy" within the meaning of the Landlord and Tenant Act 1985 or any other legislation which refers to a lease or tenancy? The decision of this House in Street v Mountford [1985] A.C. 809 is authority for the proposition that a "lease" or "tenancy" is a contractually binding agreement, not referable to any other relationship between the parties, by which one person gives another the right to exclusive occupation of land for a fixed or renewable period or periods of time, usually in return for a periodic payment in money. An agreement having these characteristics creates a relationship of landlord and tenant to which the common law or statute may then attach various incidents. The fact that the parties use language more appropriate to a different kind of agreement, such as a licence, is irrelevant if upon its true construction it has the identifying characteristics of a lease. The meaning of the agreement, for example, as to the extent of the possession which it grants, depend upon the intention of the parties, objectively ascertained by reference to the language and relevant background. The decision of your Lordships' House in Westminster City Council v Clarke [1992] A.C. 288 is a good example of the importance of background in deciding whether the agreement grants exclusive possession or not. But the classification of the agreement as a lease does not depend upon any intention additional to that expressed in the choice of terms. It is simply a question of characterising the terms which the parties have agreed. This is a question of law.

In this case, it seems to me that the agreement, construed against the relevant background, plainly gave Mr. Bruton a right to exclusive possession. There is nothing to suggest that he was to share possession with the Trust, the council or anyone else. The Trust did not retain such control over the premises as was inconsistent with Mr. Bruton having exclusive possession, as was the case in Westminster City Council v. Clarke [1992] A.C. 288. The only rights which it reserved were for itself and the council to enter at certain times and for limited purposes. As Lord Templeman said in Street v Mountford [1985] A.C. 809, 818, such an express reservation "only serves to emphasise the fact that the grantee is entitled to exclusive possession and is a tenant." Nor was there any other relationship between the parties to which Mr. Bruton's exclusive possession could be referable.

Mr. Henderson Q.C., who appeared for the Trust, submitted that there were "special circumstances" in this case which enabled one to construe the agreement as a licence despite the presence of all the characteristics identified in Street v Mountford [1985] A.C. 809. These circumstances were that the Trust was a responsible landlord performing socially valuable functions, it had agreed with the council not to grant tenancies, Mr. Bruton had agreed that he was not to have a tenancy and the Trust had no estate out of which it could grant one.

In my opinion none of these circumstances can make an agreement to grant exclusive possession something other than a tenancy. The character of the landlord is irrelevant because although the Rent Acts and other Landlord and Tenant Acts do make distinctions between different kinds of landlords, it is not by saying that what would be a tenancy if granted by one landlord will be something else if granted by another. The alleged breach of the Trust's licence is irrelevant because there is no suggestion that the grant of a tenancy would have been ultra vires either the Trust or the council: see section 32(3) of the Housing Act 1985. If it was a breach of a term of the licence from the council, that would have been because it was a tenancy. The licence could not have turned it into something else. Mr. Bruton's agreement is irrelevant because one cannot contract out of the statute. The trust's lack of title is also irrelevant, but I shall consider this point at a later stage. In Family Housing Association v Jones [1990] 1 W.L.R. 779, where the facts were very similar to those in the present case, the Court of Appeal construed the "licence" as a tenancy. Slade L.J. gave careful consideration to whether any exceptional ground existed for making an exception to the principle in Street v Mountford [1985] A.C. 809 and came to the conclusion that there was not. I respectfully agree. For these reasons I consider that the agreement between the Trust and Mr. Bruton was a lease within the meaning of section 11 of the Landlord and Tenant Act 1985.

[...]

A lease may, and usually does, create a proprietary interest called a leasehold estate or, technically, a “term of years absolute.” This will depend upon whether the landlord had an interest out of which he could grant it. Nemo dat quod non habet. But it is the fact that the agreement is a lease which creates the proprietary interest. It is putting the cart before the horse to say that whether the agreement is a lease depends upon whether it creates a proprietary interest...

For these reasons I would allow the appeal and declare that Mr. Bruton was a tenant. I should add that I express no view on whether he was a secure tenant or on the rights of the council to recover possession of the flat.

Lord Slynn and Lord Jauncey concurred.

== Significance ==
Traditionally it has been held that an estate interest (interest in land) can only arise out of one of equal or superior status. A licence is not an estate interest, and provides essentially only access to another's estate. However, the implication of the Bruton case "controversially confirms the existence in English Law of the phenomenon of the contractual or non-proprietary lease". It has been suggested by some commentators however, that Bruton was driven by policy as established in Street v Mountford, that individuals enjoying exclusive possession should be protected. There has been little reliance on the “Bruton tenancy” in later cases and it remains controversial.

== See also ==
- English land law
