= Compulsory purchase in England and Wales =

Overview of compulsory purchase in England and Wales

Compulsory purchase is the power to purchase or take rights over an estate in English land law, or to buy that estate outright, without the current owner's consent, in exchange for payment of compensation. In England and Wales, Parliament has granted several different kinds of compulsory purchase power, which can be exercised by various bodies in various situations. Such powers are meant to be used "for the public benefit". This expression is interpreted broadly, but is subject to the test of overriding or compelling public interest.

Local authorities and other statutory undertakers need the power of compulsory purchase because voluntary purchase can be laborious, longwinded, and expensive, particularly if the needed area has many owners. Private owners might not give up land needed for public works for a fair price (holdout problem); they could delay sale and thereby delay meeting a public need for a project; it might not be clear who owns the land; or the owner might not be found.

The compensation paid is meant to put the owner in the same financial position as if their land had not been taken from them.

== History ==
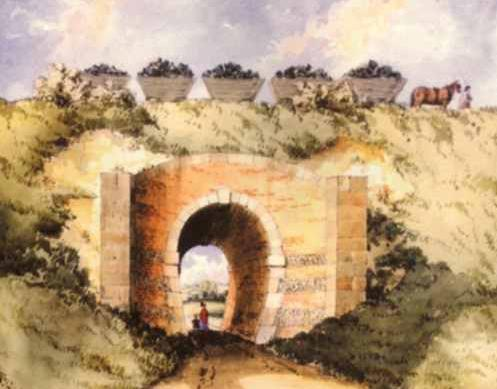
After the enclosure movement, the Surrey Railways Act 1801 (41 Geo. 3. (U.K.). c. xxxiii) used compulsory purchase to build the Surrey Iron Railway. Courts since have fought over the extent to which compulsory purchase is used for the public good.

Before the 19th century, government had no general power of compulsory purchase, so such actions needed specific private Acts of Parliament to override property rights. Examples include inclosure acts, and acts for building canals, harbours and railways. Procedures were consolidated by the Land Clauses Consolidation Act 1845 and the Inclosure Act 1845. By the late 19th century, powers of compulsory purchase slowly became more transparent and used for general social welfare, as with the Public Health Act 1875 (38 & 39 Vict. c. 55), or the Housing of the Working Classes Act 1885. Compulsory purchase legislation was significantly extended during the First World War for military use, and after the war for housing, as certain principles became standardised.

== Local authority purchase ==
Today, the Land Compensation Act 1961 section 5 generally requires that the owner of an interest in land (e.g. a freehold, leasehold or easement as in Re Ellenborough Park) receives payment for the "value of the land ... if sold on an open market by a willing seller". Compensation is often also available for losses to a home, or if one's business has to move. The Compulsory Purchase Act 1965 sets conditions for a purchase to be made, and the Acquisition of Land Act 1981 regulates the conditions for granting a "compulsory purchase order". Typically, either central government represented by a Secretary of State, or a local council will be interested in making a compulsory purchase.

The authority of local councils to make purchases for specific reasons can be set out in specific legislation, such as the Highways Act 1980 to build roads when strictly necessary. However the Town and Country Planning Act 1990 section 226, which allows compulsory purchase to "facilitate the carrying out of development, re-development or improvement" for the area's economic, social, or environmental well being, must be confirmed by the Secretary of State, and similarly the Local Government Act 1972 section 121 requires the council seek approval from the government Minister.

== Leasehold purchase ==
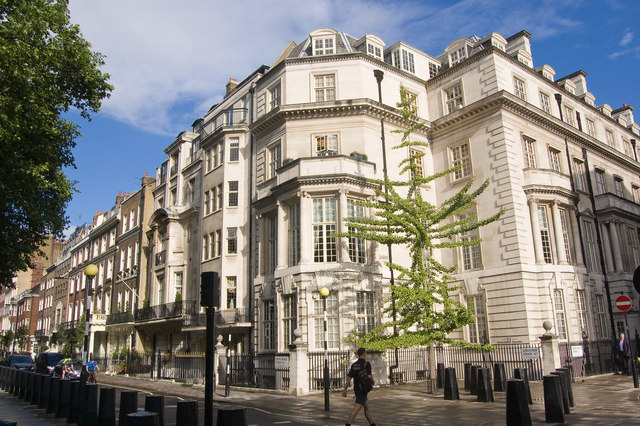
The Grosvenor family have owned most of Mayfair and Belgravia in central London since Sir Thomas married into inheritance of the land in 1677. The Grosvenor estate lost human rights challenges to the Leasehold Reform Act 1967, giving tenants a "right to buy", but the legislation was restricted.

The most general power originally appeared in the Leasehold Reform Act 1967. Under that Act, the Leasehold Reform Act 1987, and the Leasehold Reform, Housing and Urban Development Act 1992, private individuals who are leaseholders have the power in certain circumstances to compel their landlord to extend a lease or to sell the freehold at a valuation.

Recompense, under compulsory purchase, is not necessarily a monetary payment of open market value (see James v United Kingdom [1986]), but in most cases a sum equivalent to a valuation made as if between a willing seller and a willing purchaser will fall due to the previous owner.

== Utility companies ==
Utility companies have statutory powers to secure ownership or easement rights to erect electrical substations or lay sewers or water pipes on or through someone else's land. These powers are counterbalanced by corresponding rights for landowners to compel utility companies to remove cables, pipes or sewers in other circumstances (see for example section 185 of the Water Industry Act 1991).

Compulsory purchase only applies to the extent that it is needed for the purchaser's purposes. Thus, for example, a water authority does not need to buy the freehold in land in order to run a sewer through it. An easement will normally suffice, so in such cases the water authority may only acquire an easement through the use of compulsory purchase.

== Procedure ==
In most cases a Compulsory Purchase Order (CPO) is made by the purchasing authority or the Secretary of State. The CPO must unambiguously identify the land affected and set out the owners, where these are known. The order is then served on all owners and tenants with a tenancy with more than a month to run, or affixed to the land if some owners or tenants cannot be traced. A period of at least 21 days is allowed for objections. If there is a valid objection that is not withdrawn, an inquiry chaired by an inspector will take place. The inspector reports to the Secretary of State. If the Secretary of State confirms the CPO, then it becomes very difficult to challenge.

Once the CPO is confirmed, the purchasing authority may serve a Notice to Treat within three years, and a Notice of Entry within a further three years. It may take possession of the land not less than 14 days after serving the Notice of Entry. The Notice to Treat requires the land's owner to respond, and is usually the trigger for the land's owner to submit a claim for its value. If no claim is submitted within 21 days of the Notice to Treat, the acquirer can refer the matter to the Lands Tribunal. If the land's owner cannot be traced and does not respond to a Notice to Treat affixed to the land, then the purchasing authority must pay the compensation figure to the Court.

An alternative expedited procedure allows the acquiring authority to make a General Vesting Declaration that vests the property in them and formalises the right to compensation. Compensation is then either agreed or (failing which) is set by the Lands Tribunal.

== Crichel Down rules ==
The Crichel Down principles oblige central and local government, when, having acquired an estate compulsorily, they find they no longer need it for the purpose that it was taken, to offer it in the first instance at its market value to the person from whom they acquired it. However, this only applies where the land has not materially changed in character, and does not withstand the principle that councils may not dispose of land "for a consideration less than the best that can be obtained" under the Local Government Act 1972, section 123. This means that where it is difficult to value land for some reason, the land may need to be sold by tender or auction.

== Human rights ==
Because of property's social importance, either for personal consumption and use or for mass production, compulsory purchase laws have met with human rights challenges. One concern is that (since, for example, the 1980s privatisations of public companies), the use of compulsory purchase powers can benefit private corporations whose incentives may diverge from the public interest. For example, the Water Resources Act 1991 continues to allow government bodies to order compulsory purchases of people's property, although profits go to the private shareholders of UK water companies. In R (Sainsbury's Supermarkets Ltd) v Wolverhampton CC the Supreme Court held that Wolverhampton City Council acted for an improper purpose when it took into account a promise by Tesco to redevelop another site, in determining whether to make a compulsory purchase order over a site possessed by Sainsbury's. Lord Walker stressed that "powers of compulsory acquisition, especially in a 'private to private' acquisition, amounts to a serious invasion of the current owner's proprietary rights. Nevertheless compulsory purchase orders have frequently been used to acquire land that is passed back to a private owner, including in Alliance Spring Ltd v First Secretary where homes in Islington were purchased to build the Emirates stadium for Arsenal Football Club. By contrast, in James v United Kingdom, Gerald Grosvenor, 6th Duke of Westminster, the inherited owner of most of Mayfair and Belgravia, contended that leaseholders' right to buy had violated their right to property in ECHR Protocol 1, article 1. The European Court of Human Rights ruled that the Leasehold Reform Act 1967, which allowed tenants to purchase properties from their private landlords, was within a member state's margin of appreciation. It was competent for a member state to regulate property rights in the public interest.

== Legal framework ==
=== Statutes and regulations ===
- Lands Clauses Consolidation Act 1845 (8 & 9 Vict. c. 18), removed the need for special private acts for compulsory purchases driven by the railways
- Inclosure Act 1845, established Inclosure Commissioners to hear petitions for compulsory purchase and development
- Housing of the Working Classes Act 1885
- Housing of the Working Classes Act 1890
- Defence of the Realm (Acquisition of Land) Act 1916
- Acquisition of Land (Assessment of Compensation) Act 1919
- Acquisition of Land (Authorisation Procedure) Act 1946
- Highways Act 1959
- Pipelines Act 1962
- Compulsory Purchase Act 1965
- Compulsory Purchase by Ministers (Inquiries Procedure) Rules 1967
- Land Charges Act 1972
- Land Compensation Act 1973
- Highways Act 1980
- Compulsory Purchase (Vesting Declarations) Act 1981
- Housing Act 1985
- Channel Tunnel Act 1987
- Compulsory Purchase by Non-Ministerial Acquiring Authorities (Inquiries Procedure) Rules 1990
- Compulsory Purchase of Land Regulations 1990
- Water Industry Act 1991
- Transport and Works Act 1992
- Housing Act 2004
- Planning Act 2008

=== Cases ===
- Attorney-General v Great Eastern Railway Company (1880) 5 App Cas 473, 478
- Ayr Harbour Trustees v Oswald (1883) 8 App Cas 623
- Attorney-General v Manchester Corporation [1906] 1 Ch 643
- Stourcliffe Estates Co Ltd v Bournemouth Corporation [1910] 2 Ch 12
- Attorney-General v De Keyser's Royal Hotel Ltd [1920] AC 508
- Burmah Oil Co Ltd v Lord Advocate [1965] AC 75, 115. Lord Radcliffe: "The Crown has never claimed or sought to exercise in time of peace a right to take land except by agreement or under statutory power."
- Prest v Secretary of State for Wales (1982) 81 LGR 193. Lord Denning MR: "It is clear that no minister or public authority can acquire any land compulsorily except the power to do so be given by Parliament: and Parliament only grants it, or should only grant it, when it is necessary in the public interest. In any case, therefore, where the scales are evenly balanced – for or against compulsory acquisition – the decision – by whomsoever it is made – should come down against compulsory acquisition. I regard it as a principle of our constitutional law that no citizen is to be deprived of his land by any public authority against his will, unless it is expressly authorised by Parliament and the public interest decisively so demands. If there is any reasonable doubt on the matter, the balance must be resolved in favour of the citizen."

=== Other provisions ===
- Empty dwelling management orders, a form of "compulsory leasing"
- Development consent orders
