= Leasehold Reform (Ground Rent) Act 2022 =

Act of the Parliament of the United Kingdom

Leasehold Reform (Ground Rent) Act 2022 (Note: Section 26.)
- Act of Parliament
- Parliament of the United Kingdom
- Long title: An Act to make provision about the rent payable under long leases of dwellings; and for connected purposes.
- Citation: 2022 c. 1
- Introduced by: Michael Gove, Secretary of State for Levelling Up, Housing and Communities (Commons); Lord Greenhalgh (Lords)
- Territorial extent: England and Wales (Note: Section 24.)

Dates
- Royal assent: 8 February 2022
- Commencement: 1 April 2023 (Note: Section 25.)
Other legislation
Amends	Housing Act 1985; Commonhold and Leasehold Reform Act 2002
Amended by	Social Housing (Regulation) Act 2023

Status: Amended

History of passage through Parliament

Text of statute as originally enacted

Revised text of statute as amended

The Leasehold Reform (Ground Rent) Act 2022 (c. 1) is an act of the Parliament of the United Kingdom. Section 4 of the act defined the peppercorn rent as a price of one peppercorn per year and prohibited ground rent greater than that price on new leases.

Rising ground rents had prevented purchasers of leasehold properties in England from selling their homes since lenders refused to approve mortgages. This act is a part of the UK government's programme to reform the leasehold system.

== See also ==
- Leasehold Reform Act 1967
- Commonhold and Leasehold Reform Act 2002
