= Landlord and Tenant Acts =

Stock short title used for legislation

Landlord and Tenant Act (with variations) is a stock short title used for legislation about rights and responsibilities of landlords and tenants of leasehold estate in many Canadian provinces and territories, Hong Kong, the United Kingdom and the United States.

== List ==
=== Canada ===
- Saskatchewan: The Landlord and Tenant Act
- Manitoba: The Landlord and Tenant Act
- Yukon: Commercial Landlord and Tenant Act, Residential Landlord and Tenant Act
- New Brunswick: Landlord and Tenant Act
- Prince Edward Island: Landlord and Tenant Act

=== Hong Kong ===
- The Landlord and Tenant (Consolidation) Ordinance 1947
- The Distress for Rent Ordinance 1883

=== United Kingdom ===
- The Landlord and Tenant Act 1709 (8 Ann. c. 18)
- The Landlord and Tenant Act 1730 (4 Geo. 2. c. 28)
- The Landlord and Tenant Act 1851 (14 & 15 Vict. c. 25)
- The Landlord and Tenant Act 1927 (17 & 18 Geo. 5. c. 36)
- The Landlord and Tenant (War Damage) Act 1939 (2 & 3 Geo. 6. c. 72)
- The Landlord and Tenant (Rent Control) Act 1949 (12, 13 & 14 Geo. 6. c. 40)
- The Landlord and Tenant Act 1954 (2 & 3 Eliz. 2. c. 56)

Landlord and Tenant Act 1962 (Note: Section 7(1).)
- Act of Parliament
- Parliament of the United Kingdom
- Long title: An Act to require the giving of information by landlords to tenants; and for purposes connected therewith.
- Citation: 10 & 11 Eliz. 2. c. 50
- Territorial extent: England and Wales (Note: Section 7(3).)

Dates
- Royal assent: 1 August 1962
- Commencement: 1 November 1962 (Note: Section 7(2).)
- Repealed: 1 April 1986

Other legislation
- Amends: Rent and Mortgage Interest Restrictions (Amendment) Act 1933; Increase of Rent and Mortgage Interest (Restrictions) Act 1938; Rent Act 1957; Housing Act 1957
- Amended by: Statute Law (Repeals) Act 1978
- Repealed by: Housing (Consequential Provisions) Act 1985

Status: Repealed

Text of statute as originally enacted

- The Landlord and Tenant Act 1962 (10 & 11 Eliz. 2. c. 50)
- The Landlord and Tenant Act 1985 (c. 70)
- The Landlord and Tenant Act 1987 (c. 31)
- The Landlord and Tenant Act 1988 (c. 26)
- The Landlord and Tenant (Covenants) Act 1995 (c. 30)

The Landlord and Tenant Acts 1927 and 1954 means the Landlord and Tenant Act 1927 and the Landlord and Tenant Act 1954.

=== United States ===
- The Uniform Residential Landlord and Tenant Act (1972)

== See also ==
- List of short titles
- Section 8 notice
