= James v United Kingdom =

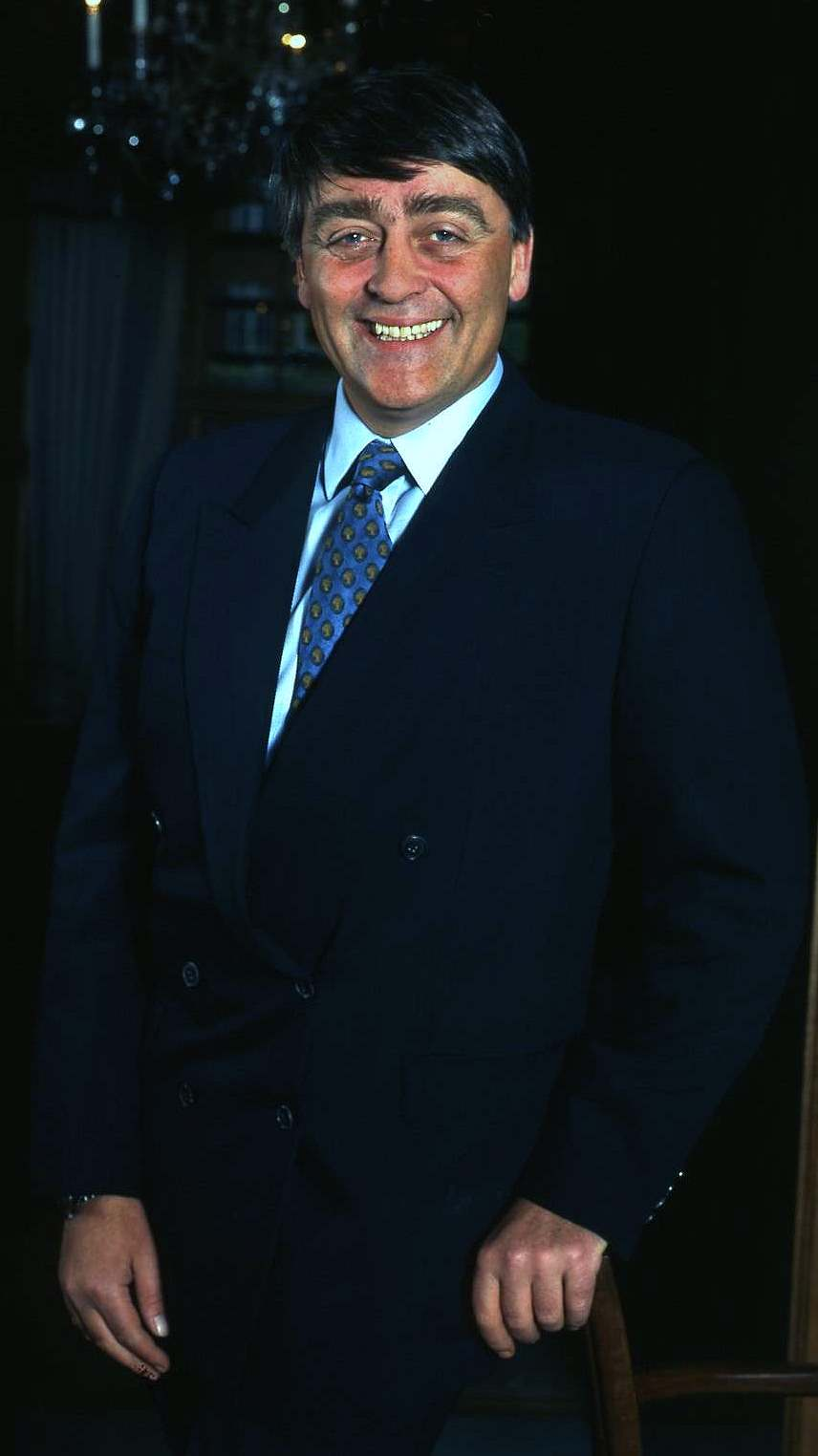
- Gerald Grosvenor, 6th Duke of Westminster (d.2016) one of the four appellants, the trustees of the Will of Hugh Grosvenor, 2nd Duke of Westminster (d.1953)
- Court: European Court of Human Rights
- Full case name: James and Others v United Kingdom
- Decided: 21 February 1986
- Citations: [1986] ECHR 2 (1986) 8 EHRR 123
- Transcript: ECHR 2

Court membership
- Judges sitting: Plenary Session (18 judges "and also of" Registrar and Deputy Registrar)

Case opinions
- "for the reasons given...above, there are no grounds for finding that the enfranchisement of the applicants’ properties was arbitrary because of the terms of compensation provided for under the leasehold reform legislation. For the rest, in the Court’s opinion, such other requirements as may be included in the phrase "subject to the conditions provided for by law" were satisfied in the circumstances of the taking of the applicants’ properties..."

Keywords
- Right to buy further interest in housing; private compulsory purchase; landlord and tenant (long lessee); validity of the Leasehold Reform Act 1967; Human Rights Law; enforced sale of residual property rights in houses and to collectives.

James v United Kingdom [1986] is an English land law case, concerning tenants' (lessees') statutory right to enfranchise a home from their freeholder (ultimate landlord) and whether specifically that right, leasehold enfranchisement, infringes the freeholder's human rights in property without being in a valid public interest.

The plenary session of the court unanimously confirmed that even if it can be shown such enfranchisement deprives a natural or legal person of their "peaceful enjoyment of their possessions" (Note: At paragraph 38: the freeholder's interest in its properties which is known as its reversions were not doubted in this case to be "in possession" for the purposes of Human Rights Law.) the above procedure is in the public interest and strictly subject to the conditions provided for by the law of England and Wales. The rights are effected (enacted) in pursuance of legitimate social policies and so meet the exception expressly in Article 1 of Protocol No. 1 to the (European) Convention on Human Rights.

The court clarified on housing policy: "Eliminating what are judged to be social injustices is an example of the functions of a democratic legislature. More especially, modern societies consider housing of the population to be a prime social need, the regulation of which cannot entirely be left to the play of market forces."

== Facts ==
All the trustees of a monetarily vast, multi-property estate passing under the will of Hugh Grosvenor, 2nd Duke of Westminster, including Gerald Grosvenor, 6th Duke of Westminster, argued they had been deprived in law of their underlying (reversionary) ownership of about 215 residential properties. They alleged the law of England and Wales contravened their human right to property under ECHR Protocol 1, article 1. Tenants had exercised statutory right to buy outright their long leasehold property converting it to a freehold. In this case expensive property being part of Grosvenor's estates in Mayfair and Belgravia in London. They did so as permitted and procedurally governed by the Leasehold Reform Act 1967.

The Act has remained in effect since Labour's Second Wilson Ministry. It enables leasehold houses to be converted, without objection, to freeholds (also known as "enfranchised") if the occupier (commonly considered the owner as a matter of practice under English long leases but not in law) follows a procedure. The procedure includes payment of the theoretical value on the market for that freehold (if sold to a third party subject to the remaining occupier's term of years — the lease). The Act seeks to enable lessees to compensate for expensive property loss (or cost of lease renewal) experienced by each lessee over a long period, as in paragraph 13 of the Court's judgment:

"The lease, however, is a wasting asset. As a lease progresses, the value of the tenant’s interest in the property diminishes, whilst the value of the landlord’s interest increases. At the end of the lease, the tenant’s interest ceases to exist and the buildings, including improvements and repairs made, revert to the landlord without any compensation to the tenant."

== Judgment ==
The European Court of Human Rights held the Leasehold Reform Act 1967 did not breach the Convention since the Act is within the limits that a national legislature has in implementing social policies.

40. The Court agrees with the applicants that a deprivation of property effected for no reason other than to confer a private benefit on a private party cannot be "in the public interest". Nonetheless, the compulsory transfer of property from one individual to another may, depending upon the circumstances, constitute a legitimate means for promoting the public interest. In this connection, even where the texts in force employ expressions like "for the public use", no common principle can be identified in the constitutions, legislation and case-law of the Contracting States that would warrant understanding the notion of public interest as outlawing compulsory transfer between private parties. The same may be said of certain other democratic countries; thus, the applicants and the Government cited in argument a judgment of the Supreme Court of the United States of America, which concerned State legislation in Hawaii compulsorily transferring title in real property from lessors to lessees in order to reduce the concentration of land ownership (Hawaii Housing Authority v Midkiff 104 S.Ct.2321 [1984]).

41. Neither can it be read into the English expression "in the public interest" that the transferred property should be put into use for the general public or that the community generally, or even a substantial proportion of it, should directly benefit from the taking. The taking of property in pursuance of a policy calculated to enhance social justice within the community can properly be described as being "in the public interest". In particular, the fairness of a system of law governing the contractual or property rights of private parties is a matter of public concern and therefore legislative measures intended to bring about such fairness are capable of being "in the public interest", even if they involve the compulsory transfer of property from one individual to another.

[...]

45. ...a taking of property effected in pursuance of legitimate social, economic or other policies may be in the public interest, even if the community at large has no direct use or enjoyment of the property taken. [...]

47. The aim of the 1967 Act, as spelt out in the 1966 White Paper, was to right the injustice which was felt to be caused to occupying tenants by the operation of the long leasehold system of tenure (see paragraph 18 above). The Act was designed to reform the existing law, said to be "inequitable to the leaseholder", and to give effect to what was described as the occupying tenant’s "moral entitlement" to ownership of the house (ibid.).

Eliminating what are judged to be social injustices is an example of the functions of a democratic legislature. More especially, modern societies consider housing of the population to be a prime social need, the regulation of which cannot entirely be left to the play of market forces. The margin of appreciation is wide enough to cover legislation aimed at securing greater social justice in the sphere of people’s homes, even where such legislation interferes with existing contractual relations between private parties and confers no direct benefit on the State or the community at large. In principle, therefore, the aim pursued by the leasehold reform legislation is a legitimate one.

== See also ==
- English land law
