= Elector's Photo Identity Card =

Indian identity document

- Front side of an Elector's Photo Identity Card issued by the Election Commission of India
- Type: Identity document
- Issued by: Election Commission of India
- First issued: 1993
- In circulation: yes
- Purpose: Voter identification
- Valid in: India
- Eligibility: Indian citizens who are at least 18 years old
- Expiration: Lifetime
- Cost: Free
- Website: www.eci.gov.in

Elector's Photo Identity Card (EPIC), commonly referred to as Voter ID Card, is an identity document issued by the Election Commission of India that primarily serves as voter identification for voting in the Indian elections. Indian citizens who are above 18 years of age are eligible to obtain the card. It was trialed in phases in the 1960s to 1980s, and was introduced nation wide in 1993. While used primarily for voter identification, it also serves as identity, address, and age proof for certain purposes, and accepted as a valid travel document by select countries.

== History ==
The idea of issuing a voter identification document was first proposed in 1957. The Representation of the People (Amendment) Bill was introduced in the Parliament of India on 27 November 1958 and was enacted into law on 30 December 1958. The amended bill provided for the introduction of photo identification cards for voter identification. Photo identity cards were first trialed in two assembly segments during a bypoll to the Calcutta South-West parliamentary constituency in 1960. However, in the ten months leading up to the polls, the Election Commission of India (ECI) issued identity cards to 213,000 electors out of the 342,000 registered electorate. The commission reported that a section of voters failed to appear and a proportion of women voters refused to take photographs, which resulted in the commission being unable to issue the cards to the entire electorate.

The ECI report on the 1962 Indian general election suggested the implementation of the project on pan India basis was considered to counter electoral maleficence and voter impersonation. It estimated that issuing voter identity cards for the electorate in Calcutta alone would cost ₹2.5 million (equivalent to ₹250 million or US$2.5 million in 2026). Though the expenditure was justified in its view, it concluded that it was not feasible to implement the project nationwide during the time. Photo identification cards were later trialed during the 1979 Sikkim Legislative Assembly election and subsequent assembly elections in Assam, Meghalaya, and Nagaland.

The Electors Photo Identity Card (EPIC) was introduced nation wide in 1993. An electronic version of the EPIC was introduced in 2021.

== Description ==
When first introduced, Electors Photo Identity Cards consisted of voter details printed in black ink on plain white paper and then laminated. In the mid-2010s, the Election Commission of India (ECI) introduced PVC-based cards printed in colour, conforming to the ISO/IEC 7810 standard. The EPIC contains the voter's name, the name of a relative (father, mother, or spouse), date of birth, gender, address, photograph, electoral constituency details, and signature. Each EPIC is assigned a unique 10-character alphanumeric number and incorporates security features such as a hologram and a barcode. The electronic cards introduced in 2021 includes a scannable QR code.

== Eligibility and process ==
An EPIC is issued to eligible Indian citizens enrolled to vote in the relevant constituency. Indian citizens aged 18 years and above, who ordinarily reside in the constituency, and are not disqualified under the law are eligible for enrollment in the electoral roll. Individuals declared to be of unsound mind, those convicted by law, and those found guilty of certain election-related offenses are ineligible to vote.

To obtain the card, applicants must submit a form prescribed by the ECI, along with valid proof of identity, Indian citizenship, age, and residence. Applications, accompanied by copies of the relevant supporting documents, may be submitted in person or sent by post to the Electoral Registration Officer or Assistant Electoral Registration Officer. Alternatively, they may be handed over to the designated Booth Level Officer for the applicant's area. It can also be filed online through the National Voters' Service Portal. The applications are generally processed within 15 days after submission. The application can be tracked by an acknowledgment reference number and the ECI reaches out to the applicant in case of discrepancies or additional information required. While the initial application is free of cost, the ECI may charge a nominal fee for the replacement of lost cards. The cards are delivered to the applicant through India Post.

== Uses ==
The EPIC primarily serves for voter identification for casting votes in the Indian elections. (Note: The Election Commission of India also accepts 12 other documents as alternatives for voter identification during polling.) It also serves as proof of identity, address, and age for other purposes, such as buying a mobile phone SIM or applying for an Indian passport. EPIC is also accepted as a valid travel document for Indian citizens to travel to Nepal and Bhutan. There have been instances where fake voter ID cards were misused for fraudulent purposes, such as obtaining SIM cards through impersonation.

== See also ==
- Aadhaar
