= Landlord and Tenant (Covenants) Act 1995 =

Act of the Parliament of the United Kingdom

Landlord and Tenant (Covenants) Act 1995 (Note: Section 32(1).)
- Act of Parliament
- Parliament of the United Kingdom
- Long title: An Act to make provision for persons bound by covenants of a tenancy to be released from such covenants on the assignment of the tenancy, and to make other provision with respect to rights and liabilities arising under such covenants; to restrict in certain circumstances the operation of rights of re-entry, forfeiture and disclaimer; and for connected purposes.
- Citation: 1995 c. 30
- Territorial extent: England and Wales (Note: Section 32(2).)

Dates
- Royal assent: 19 July 1995
- Commencement: 1 January 1996 (Note: Section 31(1). The Landlord and Tenant (Covenants) Act 1995 (Commencement) Order 1995 (SI 1995/2963).)

Other legislation
- Amends: Trustee Act 1925; Law of Property Act 1925; Land Registration Act 1925; Landlord and Tenant Act 1927; Landlord and Tenant Act 1954
- Amended by: Housing Act 1996 (Consequential Provisions) Order 1996; Land Registration Act 2002; Crime and Courts Act 2013; Digital Economy Act 2017; Renting Homes (Wales) Act 2016 (Consequential Amendments) Regulations 2022

Status: Amended

Text of statute as originally enacted

Revised text of statute as amended

Text of the Landlord and Tenant (Covenants) Act 1995 as in force today (including any amendments) within the United Kingdom, from legislation.gov.uk.

The Landlord and Tenant (Covenants) Act 1995 (c. 30) is an act of the Parliament of the United Kingdom relating to covenants.

== Provisions ==
The act abolished the privity of contract for all new leases.

The act includes covenants in collateral agreements.

The act provided that if the lease was varied in such a way that it is deemed to be a surrender and a regrant, then it is considered a new tenancy for the purposes of the act.

== Commencement ==
The act came into force on 1 January 1996.

== See also ==
- Landlord and Tenant Act
