= Ratio decidendi =

Principle of the case

Ratio decidendi (US: /ˌreɪʃioʊ ˌdɪsaɪˈdɛndi, -daɪ/; Latin plural rationes decidendi) is a Latin phrase meaning "the reason" or "the rationale for the decision". The ratio decidendi is "the point in a case that determines the judgement" or "the principle that the case establishes".

In a court judgment, the ratio decidendi is the legal rule derived from, and consistent with, those parts of its reasoning on which the outcome of the case depends. It refers to the legal, moral, political, and social principles used by the court to compose the rationale of a particular judgment. In contrast to obiter dicta, the ratio decidendi is usually binding on lower courts through the doctrine of stare decisis. Certain courts can overrule decisions of a court of coordinate jurisdiction, but they generally try to follow earlier rationes out of interests of judicial comity.

The process of determining the ratio decidendi is an analysis of what the court actually decided, based on the legal points about which the parties in the case actually fought. All other statements about the law in the text of the judgment — all pronouncements that do not form a part of the court's ruling on the issues decided in that particular case (whether they are correct statements of law or not) — are obiter dicta, and are not rules on which that particular case stands.

== Synopsis ==
The ratio decidendi is one of the most powerful tools available to a lawyer. With a proper understanding of the ratio of a precedent, the advocate can in effect force a lower court to come to a decision which that court may otherwise be unwilling to make, considering the facts of the case.

The search for the ratio of a case is a process of elucidation; one searches the judgment for the abstract principles of law which have led to the decision and which have been applied to the facts before the court. As an example, the ratio in Donoghue v. Stevenson would be that a person owes a duty of care to those who he can reasonably foresee will be affected by his actions.

All decisions are, in the common law system, decisions on the law as applied to the facts of the case. Academic or theoretical points of law are not usually determined. Occasionally, a court is faced with an issue of such overwhelming public importance that the court will pronounce upon it without deciding it. Such a pronouncement will not amount to a binding precedent, but is instead called an obiter dictum.

Ratio decidendi also involves the holding of a particular case, thereby allowing future cases to build upon such cases by citing precedent. However, not all holdings are given equal merit. Factors that can either strengthen or weaken the strength of the holding include:

- Rank of the court (Supreme Court versus an appellate court)
- Number of issues decided in the case (multiple issues may result in a so-called "multi-legged holdings")
- Authority or respect of the judge(s)
- Number of concurring and dissenting judges
- New applicable statutes
- Similarity of the environment as opposed to the age of the holding judge.

== Challenges ==
The difficulty in the search for the ratio becomes acute when in the decisions of the Court of Appeal or the House of Lords, more than one judgment is promulgated. A dissenting judgment on the point is not binding and cannot be the ratio. However, one will sometimes find decisions in which, for example, five judges are sitting the House of Lords, all of whom purport to agree with one another but in each of whose opinions one is able to discern subtly different ratios. An example is the case of Kay v Lambeth LBC, on which a panel of seven of their Lordships sat and from whose opinions emerged a number of competing ratios, some made express by their Lordships and others implicit in the decision.

Another problem may arise in older cases where the ratio and obiter are not explicitly separated, as they are today. In such a case, it may be difficult to locate the ratio, and on occasion, the courts have been unable to do so.

Such interpretative ambiguity is inevitable in any word-bound system. Codification of the law, such as has occurred in many systems based on Roman law, may assist to some extent in clarification of principle but is considered by some common law lawyers anathema to the robust, pragmatic, and fact-bound system of English law.

== See also ==
- Dictum
