= Kay v Lambeth LBC =

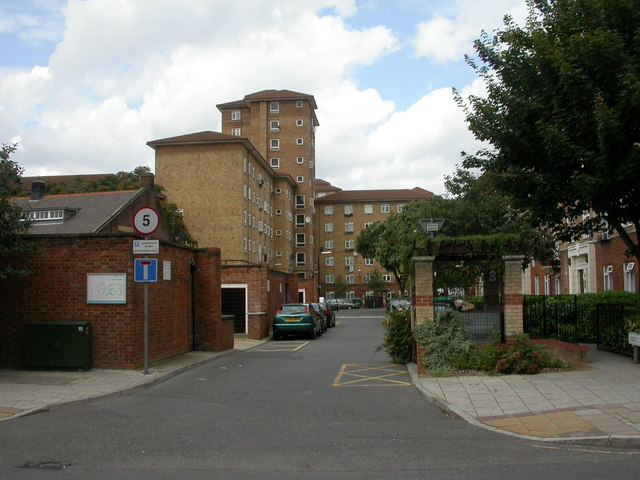
- Homes used for social/assisted housing at low rents in Lambeth.
- Court: Judicial Committee of the House of Lords
- Full case name: Kay v Lambeth London Borough Council; Price and others and others v Leeds City Council
- Decided: 8 March 2006
- Citations: [2006] UKHL 10; [2006] 2 Incorporated Council of Law Reporting Appeal Cases 465; [2006] 2 WLR 570; The Times (weekly legal report), 10 March 2006
- Transcript

Case history
- Prior actions: The sets of appellants, the occupiers, also failed at first instance and on appeal to the Court of Appeal ([2004] EWCA Civ 926 and [2005] EWCA Civ 289)

Court membership
- Judges sitting: Lord Bingham; Lord Nicholls; Lord Hope; Lord Scott; Lord Walker; Lord Brown; Baroness Hale

Case opinions
- Para 110 explicitly approved by four judges: McPhail v Persons, Names Unknown [1973] approved "a defence which does not challenge the law under which the possession order is sought as being incompatible with the article 8 but is based only on the occupier's personal circumstances should be struck out. Where domestic law provides for personal circumstances to be taken into account, as in a case where the statutory test is whether it would be reasonable to make a possession order, then a fair opportunity must be given for the arguments in favour of the occupier to be presented. But if the requirements of the law have been established and the right to recover possession is unqualified, the only situations in which it would be open to the court to refrain from proceeding to summary judgment and making the possession order are these: (a) if a seriously arguable point is raised that the law which enables the court to make the possession order is incompatible with article 8 ... in the exercise of ... jurisdiction under the Human Rights Act 1998 ... deal with the argument in one or other of two ways: (i) by giving effect to the law, so far as it is possible for it do so under section 3, in a way that is compatible with article 8, or (ii) by adjourning the proceedings to enable the compatibility issue to be dealt with in the High Court; (b) if the defendant wishes to challenge the decision of a public authority to recover possession as an improper exercise of its powers at common law on the ground that it was a decision that no reasonable person would consider justifiable, he [can] provided again that the point is seriously arguable: Wandsworth London Borough Council v Winder [1985] AC 461. The common law as explained in that case is, of course, compatible with article 8. It provides an additional safeguard."
- Concurrence: All seven judges.

Kay v Lambeth London Borough Council; Price and others and others v Leeds City Council [2006] were two, conjoined appeals in the final court of appeal (Note: At the time the final court of appeal was the Judicial Committee of the House of Lords) relevant for English property law, UK human rights and English tort law (trespass). It involved claims for possession by two landlords (in each case local authorities) against former short-term occupiers, heavily placing reliance in their defence on article 8 of the European Convention on Human Rights, with circumstances outside the other laws.

The House of Lords noted that the European Court of Human Rights accords a generous margin of appreciation to the national authorities, attaching much importance to the facts of the case. Thus, it was for the courts to decide how in the first instance the principles expounded in Strasbourg should be applied in the special context of national legislation, practice and social and other considerations. To those decisions the ordinary rules of precedent should apply.

== Facts ==
Lambeth and Leeds Councils owned flats and a park (respectively) with differing, successive short-term residential occupiers.

The facts, essentially unchanged, at the time of the hearings of the Leeds first hearing, appeal and final appeal – two days of possession – fell so far short of the threshold for establishing article 8 rights laid down in the binding appeal decision, Harrow LBC v Qazi and jurisprudence of the European Court of Human Rights, that its facts and its decision against the squatters/trespassers were closely interwoven in all the final judgments (therefore presented together in one section below).

=== Lambeth Council ===
The homes were scheduled for demolition or redevelopment. The council did not have sufficient funds to redevelop them. For more than two decades they made informal arrangements with a housing trust ("the Trust") under which the trust was able to make the properties available for occupation, among others, by homeless persons to whom the authority owed no existing duty (to rehouse or assist in finding accommodation). The trust on the face of it granted sub-licences (as opposed to sub-leases) to such people as occupiers.

The council and the trust made between each other agreements a few years into the arrangements, intended to formalise the terms: the council granted the trust licences of all the properties.

The 1999 ruling in Bruton v London & Quadrant Housing Trust [2000] UKHL meant that all standard, typical professed "licences" granted by such a trust/entity to individuals as their home such as by the trust – including those granted to the defendant occupiers – were, in law, tenancies (short leases).

During or after Bruton, the council replaced its licences with leases, but with break clauses permitting termination by either party on written notice. The council exercised these by serving notice and the trust did not contest their validity which left the council to seek possession against the occupiers on the ground that, on termination of the leases, they (the defendants) had become trespassers; they were never its tenants, nor its licensees.

The defendants (now appellants) contended, foremost, that even if they had become trespassers, they could remain by reference to their human rights as the owners had to apply article 8 (right to respect for private and family life) of the European Convention on Human Rights. Their arguments were struck down in the county court and appeals to the Court of Appeal. They appealed on the basis of the Convention, arguing that there had been a violation of Article 8 as there had been no determination by the court of the proportionality of the interference. They argued that the approach of the majority who decided the earlier legal decision as to the "width" of "gateway (b)" was incompatible with the article.

== Facts and judgment in the Leeds appeal ==
Lord Scott combined the fact pattern and legal consequences, as others in their opinions did. Concatenating his paragraphs 123–128:

The appellants were the five-adult Maloney family, travellers, whose home was in one or more caravans, often on the move from one place to another. The respondent was Leeds City Council ("Leeds"). Leeds is the owner of a recreation ground (at Spinkwell Lane). On 13 June 2004 the Maloneys moved onto it, after successively at least two other groups of travellers entered and parked there since the previous month. Two days later, on 15 June, Leeds sued in the County Court for possession. The particulars of claim said that the travellers were trespassers and refused to vacate the recreation ground. 24 June 2004 was the return date specified on the claim form. The Maloney family were the only occupiers of the recreation ground to attend court on that date and they contested. They were formally joined as defendants. The case was adjourned to be heard in October. Leeds' claim to possession was based on its ownership (not in dispute). Nor disputed was that the Maloneys were trespassers who had entered onto and remained on the land without any licence or consent from Leeds. They sought to defend by relying on article 8 and by contending that Leeds was in breach of its statutory obligations to provide suitable sites where gypsies could park their caravans. They said, also, that their personal circumstances were "exceptional" in that several members of the family suffered from medical and psychiatric problems, three members of the family were school-age children and in the twelve months preceding their trespass the family had been evicted or forced to move under threat of eviction more than fifty times. Leeds responded by notifying the family that their status as unintentionally homeless and in priority need was accepted and by accepting a duty to help them obtain accommodation.

On 22 September the case was transferred to the High Court. The article 8 issue was dealt with as a preliminary issue and, on 25 October, HHJ Bush, following Harrow LBC v Qazi, held that contractual and proprietary rights to possession could not be defeated or qualified by reliance on article 8. So he made an order for possession forthwith. He refused a stay of execution but gave leave to appeal to the Court of Appeal. Following the order for possession and the refusal of the stay of execution the Maloneys and their caravans left the recreation ground. The family gave notice of appeal to the Court of Appeal apparently "for ... ventilating the article 8 issue". Tactically this was a misuse both of public (legal aid) money and of court time on a point rendered moot as an appellate court would have no power to order Leeds to permit the Maloneys and their caravans to re-enter the recreation ground, trespassers again as they had been before. No one found any legal argument for any money compensation either.

It was common ground that the article did not give any protection to the occupation of land or a building unless the land or building is the occupier's "home". If a traveller with his caravan enters as a trespasser upon a piece of land, by what process does the small area of land on which he happens to station his caravan and, presumably, a few square yards surrounding that small area of land, become identified as his "home"? If a homeless person enters an unoccupied building, places his few possessions in one of the rooms and spends the next night or two there, does the room become his "home" in relation to which he is entitled to an article 8 "right of respect"? The answer must, I think, be 'No'. It is clearly possible for a trespasser to establish a "home" in property that belongs to someone else but whether and when he has done so must be matters of degree. In Buckley v United Kingdom (1996) the Strasbourg commission (para 63), said that

"whether or not a particular habitation constitutes a 'home' which attracts the protection of article 8(1) will depend on the factual circumstances, namely, the existence of sufficient and continuous links."

It could not credibly be suggested that in the two days between the entry by the Maloneys on the recreation ground and the commencement by Leeds of possession proceedings the Maloneys had established "sufficient and continuous links" with the piece of land on which their caravan stood so as to constitute that singular piece of land their article 8(1) "home".

The facts therefore in the Leeds case made it "a very bad one to choose for the purpose of revisiting the correctness of Qazi since ... it is grotesque to suppose that the Maloneys could claim that the commencement by Leeds of possession proceedings to recover its recreation ground was an interference with their right to respect for a "home" that they had established on Leeds' land.

Be that as it may, the Lambeth [appeal], by contrast, seems to me a very good test case.

Both Judge Bush and the Court of Appeal, following Qazi, rejected the Maloneys' reliance on article 8.

— Lord Scott of Foscote, paras 128–131.

As shown above, the House of Lords confirmed that this rejection based on the facts themselves was the only non-absurd solution; to permit the family to re-enter would be permitting them to trespass onto a public recreation ground.

== Judgment in the Lambeth appeal ==
In the House of Lords, Lord Bingham gave the leading 49 paragraphs of the judgment. He held that the European Court accorded a generous margin of appreciation to the national authorities, attaching much importance to the facts of the case. Thus, it was for the courts to decide how in the first instance the principles expounded in Strasbourg should be applied in the special context of national legislation, practice and social and other considerations. To those decisions the ordinary rules of precedent should apply.

The ruling applies generally to homeless people who are being fairly treated as against other of their status and to whom a local authority fairly would find as lower priority in its duty to assist in finding housing. If such people are granted a sub-licence by a real estate investment trust allowing them to occupy accommodation temporarily they do not, become secured (i.e. tenants) of the local authority. Any earlier transfer (by document) by a local authority is not relevant. Also irrelevant is that the licence may be interpreted in law as an assured shorthold tenancy, as against the real estate investment trust.

== See also ==
- Ratio decidendi
