= Landlord and Tenant Act 1987 =

Act of the Parliament of the United Kingdom

Landlord and Tenant Act 1987 (Note: Section 62(1).)
- Act of Parliament
- Parliament of the United Kingdom
- Long title: An Act to confer on tenants of flats rights with respect to the acquisition by them of their landlord’s reversion; to make provision for the appointment of a manager at the instance of such tenants and for the variation of long leases held by such tenants; to make further provision with respect to service charges payable by tenants of flats and other dwellings; to make other provision with respect to such tenants; to make further provision with respect to the permissible purposes and objects of registered housing associations as regards the management of leasehold property; and for connected purposes.
- Citation: 1987 c. 31
- Territorial extent: England and Wales (Note: Section 62(4).)

Dates
- Royal assent: 15 May 1987
- Commencement: various (Note: Section 62(2).)

Other legislation
- Amends: Land Registration Act 1925; Local Government Act 1985; Housing Act 1985; Housing Associations Act 1985; Landlord and Tenant Act 1985
- Amended by: Land Registration Act 2002; Commonhold and Leasehold Reform Act 2002; Policing and Crime Act 2017; Digital Economy Act 2017

Status: Amended

Text of statute as originally enacted

Revised text of statute as amended

Text of the Landlord and Tenant Act 1987 as in force today (including any amendments) within the United Kingdom, from legislation.gov.uk.

The Landlord and Tenant Act 1987 (c. 31) is an act of the Parliament of the United Kingdom.

== Overview ==
The act is, amongst other things, very significant to leaseholders in England and Wales. Significant alterations were made to sections 18 - 30 of the Landlord and Tenant Act 1985. The 1987 act also introduced three new things of lasting significance to long leaseholders of particular relevance in relation to their service charge liabilities. Firstly, it gave leaseholders and landlords specific rights to apply to a court or tribunal to vary the terms of a lease. Secondly, it introduced specific rules about retaining service charge contributions in designated trust accounts. Thirdly, it introduced an obligation for Landlords to provide their name and address when issuing service charge demands. Sections 47 and 48 of the 1987 Act state that without this information, service charge demands to leaseholders in England and Wales are invalid.

== Section 62 - Short title, commencement and extent ==
Orders made under section 62(2)

- The Landlord and Tenant Act 1987 (Commencement No. 1) Order 1987 (SI 1987/2177 (C.66))
- The Landlord and Tenant Act 1987 (Commencement No. 2) Order 1988 (SI 1988/480 (C.12))
- The Landlord and Tenant Act 1987 (Commencement No. 3) Order 1988 (SI 1988/1283 (C.48))

== See also ==
- Landlord and Tenant Act
