= R (on the application of Coughlan) v Minister for the Cabinet Office =

UK voter ID legal case

- Court: Supreme Court of the United Kingdom
- Argued: 15 February 2022
- Decided: 27 April 2022
- Neutral citation: [2022] UKSC 11

Case history
- Appealed from: England and Wales Court of Appeal

Court membership
- Judges sitting: Lord Reed, Lord Sales, Lord Hamblen, Lord Stephens, Dame Siobhan Keegan

Case opinions
- Pilot schemes for voter ID are not ultra vires section 10 of the Representation of the People Act 2000
- Decision by: Lord Stephens (joined by Lord Reed, Lord Sales, Lord Hamblen and Dame Siobhan Keegan)

Area of law
- Election law

R (on the application of Coughlan) v Minister for the Cabinet Office [2022] UKSC 11 was a decision of the Supreme Court of the United Kingdom regarding whether the introduction of voter ID pilot schemes was legal under section 10 of the Representation of the People Act 2000. The court held unanimously that it was legal and dismissed the appeal.

== Background ==
At the 2017 general election, the Conservative Party pledged in their manifesto to "legislate to ensure that a form of identification must be presented before voting". The Conservatives remained in government and piloted voter ID in five local authorities at the 2018 local elections: Bromley, Gosport, Swindon, Watford and Woking.

The government sought further local authorities to pilot the scheme in the 2019 local elections. In November 2018, it was announced that Braintree, Broxtowe, Derby, East Staffordshire, Mid Sussex, North Kesteven, North West Leicestershire, Pendle and Ribble Valley would be joining the pilot scheme, although East Staffordshire and Ribble Valley later pulled out. The Minister for the Cabinet Office, David Lidington, then made orders under Section 10 of the Representation of the People Act 2000 (RPA) to allow the pilot schemes to go ahead in those areas.

== Case ==
Neil Coughlan, a voluntary worker, former district councillor and resident of Witham (part of Braintree District Council), did not have access to photo ID which would have rendered him unable to vote. In December 2018, he began crowdfunding £10,000 to fund a legal case to challenge the pilot schemes.

In January 2019, Coughlan sought judicial review of the schemes, arguing that voter ID requirements would "disenfranchise the poor and vulnerable who already have their voices heard". Coughlan suggested that the orders which implemented the pilot schemes were ultra vires (outside the legal power given to the Minister) because they were not schemes within the meaning of section 10(2)(a) of the RPA, and that the schemes themselves were not authorised for a legal purpose under section 10(1).

The case had several interveners: the Runnymede Trust, Operation Black Vote and Voice4Change England all expressed concerns that voter ID measures would create barriers for ethnic minority communities to vote and Stonewall and the LGBT Foundation expressed similar concerns that it would impact voting access for LGBTQ+ people.

=== Previous proceedings ===
In March 2019, High Court judge Michael Supperstone ruled that the schemes had been "made lawfully". Coughlan gained permission to appeal the decision in October 2019. In June 2020, his case was rejected in a Court of Appeal judgement by Lord Justice McCombe (joined by Lords Justice Underhill and Green).

== Judgment ==
The appeal was dismissed unanimously, with all judges agreeing that pilot schemes were within the meaning of section 10(2)(a) of the RPA and were authorised for a lawful purpose under section 10(1).

== Reaction ==
Labour Shadow Minister for Voter Engagement and Youth Affairs Cat Smith said the challenge was "vital for defending British democracy". Sam Coates from Unlock Democracy said the case was "an important response to attempts to rig the next election in the government's favour".

After the judgment, Coughlan said he was "very disappointed by the outcome" of the case, but noted that the fact it had made its way to the Supreme Court "reflects the importance of the issues".

== See also ==
- Elections in the United Kingdom
- 2022 judgments of the Supreme Court of the United Kingdom
