= Landlord and Tenant Act 1988 =

- Act of Parliament
- Parliament of the United Kingdom
- Long title: An Act to make new provision for imposing statutory duties in connection with covenants in tenancies against assigning, underletting, charging or parting with the possession of premises without consent.
- Citation: 1988 c. 26
- Territorial extent: England and Wales

Dates
- Royal assent: 29 July 1988
- Commencement: 29 September 1988

Status: Amended

Text of statute as originally enacted

Text of the Landlord and Tenant Act 1988 as in force today (including any amendments) within the United Kingdom, from legislation.gov.uk.

The Landlord and Tenant Act 1988 (c. 26) is an act of the Parliament of the United Kingdom.

== Section 7 - Short title, commencement and extent ==
Section 7(2) provides that the act came into force at the end of the period of two months that began on the date on which it was passed. The word "months" means calendar months. The day (that is to say, 29 July 1988) on which the act was passed (that is to say, received royal assent) is included in the period of two months. This means that the act came into force on 29 September 1988.

== See also ==
- Landlord and Tenant Act
