= Right to manage =

Right of some leasehold property owners to manage their building

In England and Wales, the Commonhold and Leasehold Reform Act 2002 provides a right for leaseholders to change the appointment of the management of their building to another provider, by setting up a special company to take over from the freeholder those rights of appointment of management of the building. This right to manage (RTM) allows some leasehold property owners to take over management of the building, even without the agreement of the landlord. To use the right, leaseholders must set up an RTM company and follow certain procedures. The RTM company can manage the building directly, or pay a managing agent to do it. An RTM company is a way to deal with the issue of absentee landlords. [1]

== One right to manage company per block ==
In the March 2015 case Triplerose Ltd v 90 Broomfield Road RTM Co Ltd, the Court of Appeal found in favour of Triplerose Ltd (freeholder) against 90 Broomfield Road (residents/lessees) in what was a landmark case. The court ruled:

An RTM company can only acquire one building. If it was permissible for an RTM company to acquire the management of more than one building, it could lead to absurdities whereby the RTM company managed different blocks on different estates in different parts of the country. Furthermore, in an RTM company comprising members of two different sized blocks, the members of the larger block could always outvote the smaller block and act contrary to its interests (e.g. by consenting to sub-letting even if the smaller block did not wish this).

The result of this ruling is that no right-to-manage company can apply to manage multiple blocks on an estate.

The right relates to a building, so, in an estate of separate blocks, each block would need to qualify separately and an individual RTM notice served. In the case of an estate of flats under the same management, it would be sensible to take over the management of the whole estate, but this would have to be accomplished by application in respect of each separate block.

== The duty to transfer funds ==
The legal obligation of the freeholder or previous management company is to pass forward any unspent funds. In practice, if these are less than £2,000, it may not be economic to pursue them through the courts, but ultimate determination can be made by a leasehold valuation tribunal.

== Freeholder's membership of the right-to-manage company ==
Immediately upon the RTM company taking over on the acquisition date, the landlord (freeholder) becomes entitled to membership of the company, with full voting rights as a company member (if they wish to take it up). The landlord's votes are, in the first instance, determined according to the units they hold in the building, flats or non-residential parts. In cases where they hold no units, and therefore would have no votes, they are allocated one vote as the landlord.

As the right to manage is not default-based, there is no reason why the landlord, who retains an interest in the building, should not have some input to the practicalities of its management. It is different where the manager has been appointed by a tribunal to replace a poor or incompetent manager – there the landlord is removed entirely as a consequence of his mismanagement. With the right to manage, it is assumed that the landlord is not necessarily at fault and so there is no justification for his exclusion from the management process.
