= Landlord and Tenant Act 1985 =

Act of the Parliament of the United Kingdom

Landlord and Tenant Act 1985 (Note: Section 40(1).)
- Act of Parliament
- Parliament of the United Kingdom
- Long title: An Act to consolidate certain provisions of the law of landlord and tenant formerly found in the Housing Acts, together with the Landlord and Tenant Act 1962, with amendments to give effect to recommendations of the Law Commission.
- Citation: 1985 c. 70
- Territorial extent: England and Wales (Note: Section 40(3).)

Dates
- Royal assent: 30 October 1985
- Commencement: 1 April 1986 (Note: Section 40(2).)

Other legislation
- Amended by: Housing and Planning Act 1986; Commonhold and Leasehold Reform Act 2002; Policing and Crime Act 2017; Renters' Rights Act 2025
- Relates to: Landlord and Tenant Act 1962; Housing Act 1985; Housing Associations Act 1985; Housing (Consequential Provisions) Act 1985; Renting Homes (Wales) Act 2016; Social Housing (Regulation) Act 2023

Status: Amended

Text of statute as originally enacted

Revised text of statute as amended

Text of the Landlord and Tenant Act 1985 as in force today (including any amendments) within the United Kingdom, from legislation.gov.uk.

The Landlord and Tenant Act 1985 (c. 70) is an act of the Parliament of the United Kingdom on English land law. It sets minimum standards in tenants' rights in relation to their landlords.

== Background ==
The reason for the introduction of the act was not as might be assumed to help the existing private residential landlords who were in 1985 obliged by law to have regulated tenancies. Their regulated tenancies gave all tenants a tenancy for life which they could pass onto other occupants in the home when they died. Rents were set typically 50% of market value. They could not be re-mortgaged because of the sitting tenant and if sold were worth 50% of vacant possession value because of the regulated tenant being in place.

At this time regulated tenancies were the only tenancy available to private landlords and made up just 5% of housing stock. Private rent levels were set by 'fair rent officers'. With insufficient rent to make a profit or pay expensive property repairs, private landlords sold up as soon as a tenant moved out, as there were better investments elsewhere. The reason the Landlord and Tenant Act was passed was in preparation for the privatisation of the housing associations (who had been deliberately excluded from the Right to Buy Scheme although they had 400,000 dwellings). This legislation should be seen in context with the Housing and Planning Act 1986 which gave councils the option of transferring housing stock to another private landlord (registered social landlord) and the Housing Act 1988 that deregulated the private rental sector for a few years until re-instated in 1991 by the Labour Party on regulated tenancies only, so now housing associations could charge what they liked, raise private investment, sell council houses etc.

The Act was not fundamentally altered by either the Major, Blair, Brown or Cameron governments in reference to fair rents, rights to fair reasons for ending a tenancy, or prohibiting estate agent fees. However, amendments were inserted by the Landlord and Tenant Act 1987, Housing Act 1996, the Commonhold and Leasehold Reform Act 2002, the Localism Act 2011, and the Homes (Fitness for Human Habitation) Act 2018, and in Wales the Renting Homes (Wales) Act 2016.

== Contents ==
Sections 1 to 3A require that landlords give basic information to tenants regarding their identity, including directors if the landlord is a company. Under section 3A, landlords must disclose whether there is a right (statutory or otherwise) of the tenant to acquire the landlord's interest.

Sections 4 to 7 require information to be contained in rent books. Section 5 requires this include the name and address of the landlord, the rent, terms and conditions of the contract, or matters prescribed by the Secretary of State in regulations.

Sections 8 to 10 state it is an implied contract term that the property will be fit for human habitation, which under section 10 includes the state of "repair, stability, freedom from damp, internal arrangement, natural lighting, ventilation, water supply, drainage and sanitary conveniences, facilities for preparation and cooking of food and for the disposal of waste water".

Sections 11 to 17 place mandatory duties on landlords to repair properties in leases under 7 years that are dwelling houses (where people live). Section 11 specifies the repair obligation includes "the structure and exterior of the dwelling-house (including drains, gutters and external pipes)", installations for "water, gas and electricity and for sanitation (including basins, sinks, baths and sanitary conveniences", and "for space heating and heating water".

Sections 18 to 30 limit any "service charges" that a landlord can charge a tenant. These are designed to stop landlords, who receive rent, from imposing further unreasonable charges, and under section 19 any such charges must be strictly related to cost. Offences are committed by the landlord for not at all times providing relevant information, and certifying the relevant information by a qualified accountant. Section 20 provides for leaseholders to be consulted before maintenance and improvement costs can be recovered from leaseholders and assured tenants. Where the landlord is a contracting authority for public procurement purposes, the conduct of compliant consultation needs to be interwoven with a procurement exercise compliant with the Public Contract Regulations 2015. It is possible to apply to the Property Chamber of the First Tier Tribunal for a dispensation from the requirement to consult, for example in an urgent situation.

Section 30A and the Schedule to the act, inserted by the Commonhold and Leasehold Reform Act 2002, give tenants rights to summaries of any insurance policy contained in a service charge. Under section 30B a "recognised tenants’ association" (by the First-tier Tribunal in England) has a right to be consulted about anyone working as a managing agent.

Under section 31, the Secretary of State still has a "reserve power" to limit rents by order. Specifically, anywhere in England or Wales, an order may be passed "(a) restricting or preventing increases of rent for dwellings which would otherwise take place, or (b) restricting the amount of rent which would otherwise be payable on new lettings of dwellings" for any homes, anywhere. This power has not been used in any significant way.

Sections 31A to 39 set out "supplementary" provisions. Sections 31A-C concern the jurisdiction of the leasehold valuation tribunal. Section 33 states directors of companies are jointly liable with companies for offences committed with their consent. Sections 36 to 39 contain definitions.

Sections 18 to 30 form the basis of the legal rights and responsibilities of English and Welsh leaseholders in respect of variable residential service charges.

== Proposed amendments ==
Significant political discussion has revolved around the reintroduction of genuine rent regulation, to assure a legislative charter of tenants rights. This includes, first, regulation of the maximum increases of rent by a landlord, as operates in most OECD countries such as Canada and Germany. Second, there have been calls to ensure tenants have the right to remain in their home unless the landlord has a good reason to evict them, particularly so that landlords cannot evict old tenants and raise rent on new tenants. Thirdly, various proposals have been made to stop estate agents charging fees to tenants, in the same way that employment agencies are banned from charging fees to people seeking work by the Employment Agencies Act 1973.

== See also ==
- English land law
- Landlord and Tenant Acts
- Section 8 notice

== Bibliography ==
- S Bright, Landlord and Tenant Law in Context (2007)
- K Gray and SF Gray, Land Law (OUP 2011)
