= Landlord and Tenant Act 1927 =

Act of the Parliament of the United Kingdom

Landlord and Tenant Act 1927 (Note: Section 26(1).)
- Act of Parliament
- Parliament of the United Kingdom
- Long title: An Act to provide for the payment of compensation for improvements and goodwill to tenants of premises used for business purposes, or the grant of a new lease in lieu thereof; and to amend the law of landlord and tenant.
- Citation: 17 & 18 Geo. 5. c. 36
- Territorial extent: England and Wales (Note: Section 26(3).)

Dates
- Royal assent: 22 December 1927
- Commencement: 25 March 1928 (Note: Section 26(2).)
Other legislation
Amended by	Statute Law Revision Act 1950; Landlord and Tenant Act 1954; Rent Act 1957; Charities Act 1960; Crown Estate Act 1961; Recorded Delivery Service Act 1962; Finance Act 1963; Land Charges Act 1972; Endowments and Glebe Measure 1976; Rentcharges Act 1977; Housing Act 1980; Agricultural Holdings Act 1986; Water Act 1989; Electricity Act 1989; Landlord and Tenant (Covenants) Act 1995; Agricultural Tenancies Act 1995; Gas Act 1995; Trusts of Land and Appointment of Trustees Act 1996; Gas Act 1986; Civil Procedure (Modification of Enactments) Order 2001; Charities Act 2006; Charities Act 2022; Renting Homes (Wales) Act 2016 (Consequential Amendments) Regulations 2022

Status: Amended

Text of statute as originally enacted

Revised text of statute as amended

Text of the Landlord and Tenant Act 1927 as in force today (including any amendments) within the United Kingdom, from legislation.gov.uk.

The Landlord and Tenant Act 1927 (17 & 18 Geo. 5. c. 36) is an act of the Parliament of the United Kingdom that regulates the relationship between landlords and tenants.

While much of the act has been superseded by the Landlord and Tenant Act 1954 (2 & 3 Eliz. 2. c. 56), some provisions remain in force.
