= Marriage Value =

Concept in property valuation

Marriage value, also called synergistic value, is a concept in property valuation. It is defined by the Royal Institution of Chartered Surveyors as "an additional element of value created by the combination of two or more assets or interests where the combined value is more than the sum of the separate values".

In England and Wales, the term is most often encountered in leasehold enfranchisement where a valuation is undertaken with a view to extending a residential lease or purchasing the freehold of a residential property held on a ground lease. The issue arises as it had been common practice in England until June 2022 for flats – and occasionally houses – to be sold on the basis that the purchaser obtains a lease usually of 99 years or longer at a modest rent – described as a ground rent – and pays close to a freehold price for doing so. The Leasehold Reform (Ground Rent) Act 2022 which came into force on 30 June 2022 changed this practice by requiring almost all new residential leases to have a zero ground rent (often referred to as a "peppercorn"). .

A ground lease is a wasting asset to the leaseholder because the value of the property declines relative to its long lease value as the lease becomes shorter. In the absence of legislation allowing leaseholders to extend their lease the property would revert to the freeholder upon expiry of the lease at which point the value of the leaseholder's interest would be nil. Legislation provides that a qualifying leaseholder may extend their lease on payment of compensation to the freeholder. Part of that compensation is a proportion of the increase in value to the flat resulting from the lease extension. For example, a property may have a value of £300,000 if it has a 99 year lease but only be worth 85% of that value if the lease has only 70 years remaining. If the leaseholder with 70 years unexpired is entitled to extend the lease to 99 years or more, they have the opportunity to increase the value of their interest in the property by £45,000. This figure is the marriage value. Leasehold legislation in the UK recognises that this marriage value would result in a windfall to the lessee when the lease extends and therefore provides that this marriage value is split, generally on a 50/50 basis, between the freeholder and leaseholder - although there is specific provision in the legislation that if there is more than 80 years remaining on the lease at the time of application to extend, the leaseholder is not under an obligation to pay any marriage value to the freeholder.

Following the passing of the Leasehold and Freehold Reform Act in Parliament on 24 May 2024 the requirement upon leaseholders to pay marriage value to freeholders will be removed once a statutory instrument is introduced to give effect to the relevant provision within the Act, although no time frame is currently available for when this will occur.

The term marriage value is likely a misnomer in residential lease extension as two interests are not being combined, rather one is being extended, but the term remains widely used in the valuation of leasehold property in the UK. There are other circumstances where marriage value may be applicable and the term synergistic value is more often used in those contexts.
