= Voter identification laws =

Laws requiring proof of identity to vote

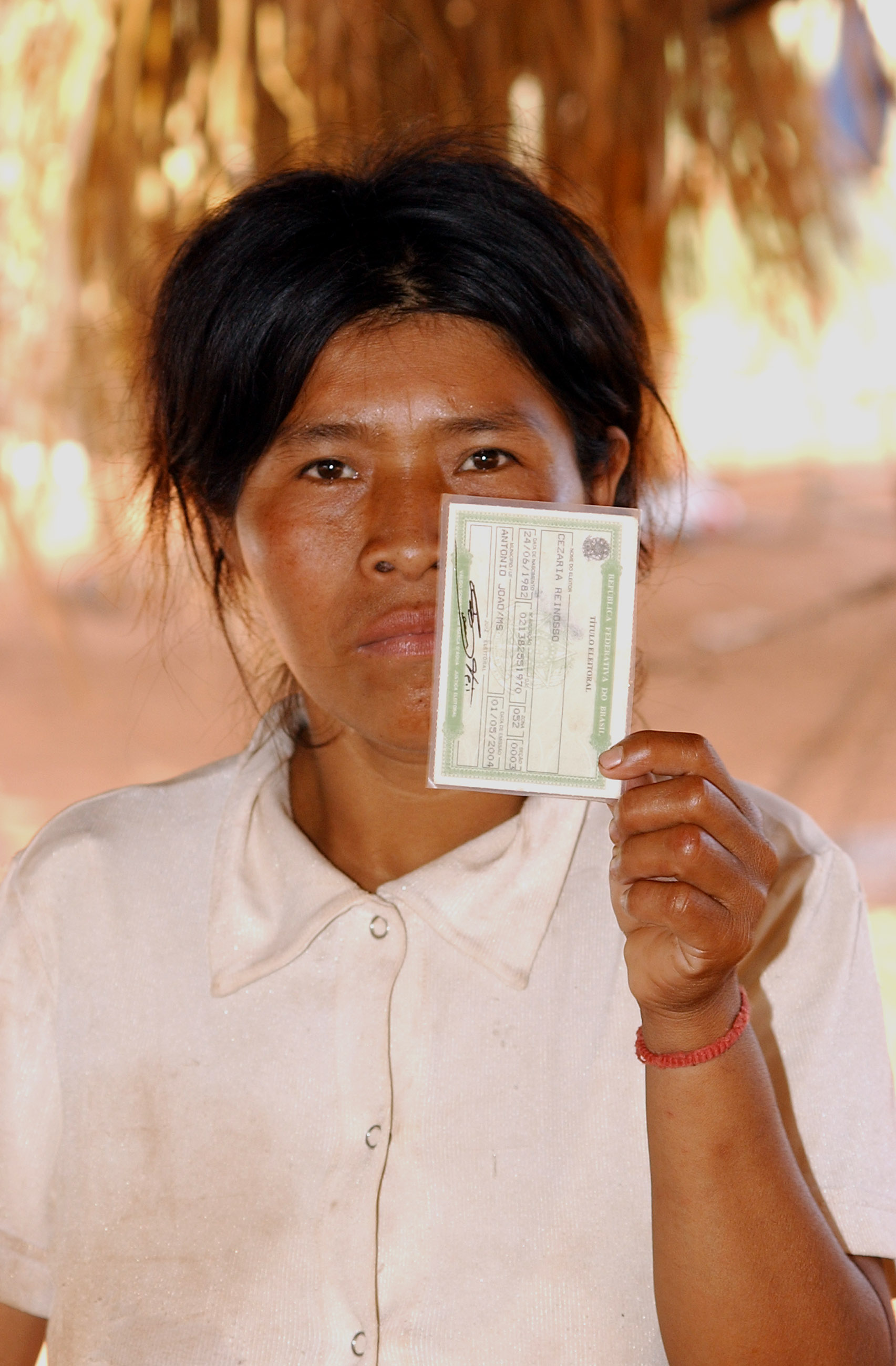
A Guarani-Kaiowá indigenous woman shows her Carteira de identidade Nacional (National Identity Card) in the municipality of Antônio João, Mato Grosso do Sul, Brazil.

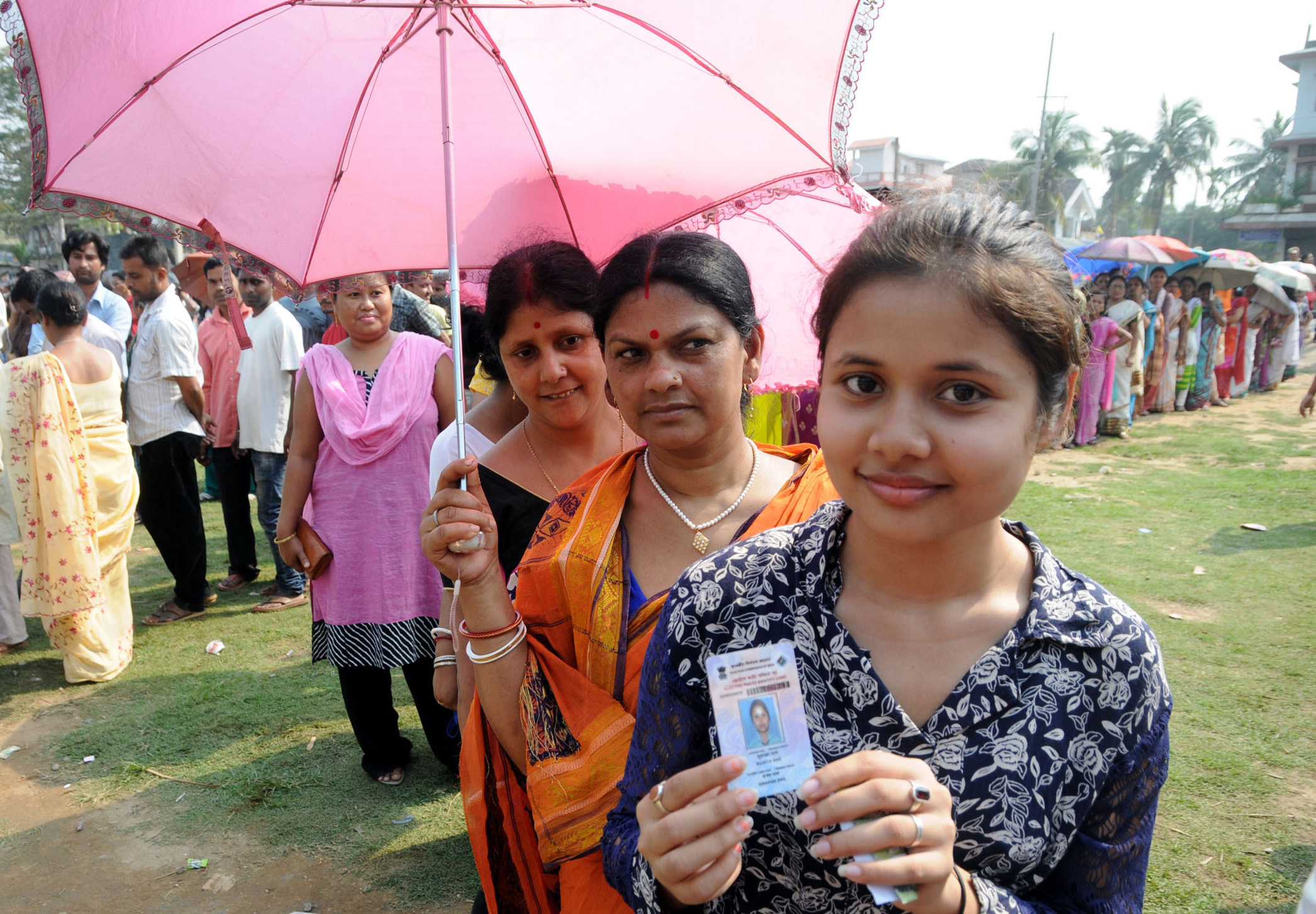
A young girl showing a Elector's Photo Identity Card (EPIC) at a polling booth during the 2016 Assam Legislative Assembly election at Maidamgaon, in Kamrup Metropolitan district, Assam, India.

A voter identification law is a law that requires a person to show some form of identification to vote. In some jurisdictions requiring photo IDs, voters who do not have photo ID often must have their identity verified by someone else (such as in Sweden) or sign a Challenged Voter Affidavit (such as in New Hampshire) to receive a ballot to vote. In 2008, the US Supreme Court ruled in Crawford v. Marion County Election Board that free or affordable voter or photo identification proving citizenship put no significant burden on voters in the United States. Voter ID was found to have no negative impact on voter turnout. Photo ID was required by 176 countries or jurisdictions for voting as of 2021.

== By country ==
=== Argentina ===
In Argentina, voting is compulsory for all citizens between 18 and 70 years old, non-compulsory for those older than 70 and between 16 and 18, and citizens with domiciles in foreign countries. To vote they must present a valid Documento Nacional de Identidad at the corresponding voting center.

Other countries in Latin America have similar policies.

=== Australia ===
In Australia, voting is compulsory for all adult citizens. Failure to cast a ballot in a federal election without a valid reason may as of 2023 attract a fine of A$20, and each state imposes its own fines for the same offence in state elections.

No form of ID is required to cast a ballot in person at a polling location; instead, voters are asked three questions before being issued a ballot, so that they can be checked off the electoral roll: name, residence address, and if they have voted before in this election. On election day, voters can vote at any polling place in their state of residence, and at selected polling places in other states.

If a person is voting by mail, they are required to include their Australian driver's licence or Australian passport number and the address they are currently enrolled at.

To register to vote, Australians must fill out a form, provide identification, and send it in the mail. After submission, the form's contents, in particular the registered voter's identity in most states, are not double checked by the government.

In October 2021, the Liberal Morrison government had plans for a Voter ID Law: under the proposed voter integrity bill, a voter unable to produce ID can still vote if their identity can be verified by another voter, or by casting a declaration vote, which requires further details, such as date of birth and a signature.

=== Brazil ===
In Brazil, voting is compulsory for all citizens between 18 and 70 years old. To vote, all citizens must:

- Be registered to vote, get a voter ID card, called "Título Eleitoral" aka "Título de Eleitor" in Brazil. Presenting the voter ID card when voting is optional.
- Report in person to the voting section.
- Present an official identity document with photo, usually the regular ID card (cédula de identidade).

Since 2006, the Brazilian Electoral Justice has been re-registering voters with biometric identification. For the 2014 elections, it was predicted that more than 22 million voters out of 141 million would be identified by fingerprints.

=== Canada ===
==== Federal elections ====
In Canada, the Federal government mails an Elections Canada registration confirmation card, which the voter takes to the polling station. The card tells the individual where and when to vote. Voters must prove their identity and address with one of three options:

- Show one original government-issued piece of identification with photo, name and address, like a driver's license or a health card.
- Show two original pieces of authorized identification. Both pieces must have a name and one must also have an address. Examples: student ID card, birth certificate, public transportation card, utility bill, bank/credit card statement, etc.
- Take an oath and have an elector who knows the voter vouch for them (both of whom must make a sworn statement). This person must have authorized identification and their name must appear on the list of electors in the same polling division as the voter. This person can only vouch for one person and the person who is vouched for cannot vouch for another elector.

==== Provincial elections ====
Voter identification regulations vary from province to province. In Ontario, "ID is required to vote or to add or update your voter information on the voters list" and a substantial number of acceptable IDs, which do not need to be photo IDs, are accepted. In Quebec, the voter must show one of five government-issued photo IDs, and if lacking any of these, will be directed to the identity verification panel. In British Columbia, "all voters must prove their identity and residential address before voting", with three options offered for identification.

=== Czech Republic ===
In the Czech Republic, voter registration of Czech citizens is automatic and requires no action from the eligible person; citizens of other EU countries residing in the Czech Republic have to actively visit a local government office if they wish to register. All voters have to present an eligible form of photo ID, such as a passport or compulsory Czech national identity card at a polling station before they are allowed to vote. Not all photo IDs are eligible (for example, a driver's license is not allowed). No person is allowed to vote before presenting an eligible photo ID. The legal requirement to present a photo ID has been in effect since 1 August 2000.

=== Finland ===
In Finnish elections, eligible voters are sent a notice of the right to vote (notification of eligibility) to their home address by mail. The notification of eligibility will designate a voter's polling station, where voters must cast their vote, if voting on election day. Advance voting is possible at any of the general advance polling stations in Finland or abroad. Voters must present an identity document when voting.

=== France ===
In France, voters must prove their identity when registering to vote, with proof of address (phone, water or electricity bill) and an identity document that proves your nationality: National Identity Card or Passport. On the day of the vote, in towns larger than 1,000 inhabitants, an identity document is required.

=== Germany ===
In Germany, due to compulsory registration of residence with the municipality, the voter roll is kept automatically without any need to register to vote. Everyone eligible to vote receives a personal polling notification by mail, 4 to 8 weeks before the election. The notification indicates the voter's precinct polling station. Voters must present their polling notification and, if asked, a piece of photo ID (identity card or passport issued by the government). If the voter cannot present the notification, a valid photo ID and an entry in the register of voters can qualify for voting.

=== Greece ===
Voters identify themselves by their ID cards and are given the full number of ballot papers for the constituency, plus a blank ballot paper and an empty envelope.

=== Hungary ===
Voting is voluntary for all citizens 18 years or older. All voters should show a photo ID and an address card. To prevent duplicate voting, they need to register themselves if they want to vote at a different place to the residence on their address card.

=== Iceland ===
Voting is voluntary for all citizens 18 years or older in Iceland. All voters must present photo ID to vote for their preferred candidate. To prevent duplicate voting fraud, every voter is checked against the national voter database before their ballot is placed into the ballot box.

=== India ===
Front side of an Elector's Photo Identity Card issued by the Election Commission of India

The Elector's Photo Identity Card (EPIC) is an identity document issued by the Election Commission of India (ECI) to registered electors, that is, Indian citizens aged 18 or above enrolled in the electoral roll. Introduced in 1993 during the tenure of Chief Election Commissioner T. N. Seshan, it is used mainly to establish identity at the polling station and is also widely accepted as general proof of identity and address. An EPIC is also among the documents accepted for travel by Indian citizens to Nepal and Bhutan.

==== Identification at polling stations ====
The ECI may direct the issue of EPICs under the Representation of the People Act, 1951 to prevent impersonation at polling stations. Electors on the roll who cannot produce their EPIC may present one of 12 alternative photo identity documents, including Aadhaar, an Indian passport, a driving licence, a PAN card, an MGNREGA job card, a photo passbook issued by a bank or post office, and a Unique Disability ID card. An EPIC issued by another constituency is also accepted if the elector's name appears in the roll of the polling station where they are voting.

==== Aadhaar linking ====
The Election Laws (Amendment) Act, 2021 amended the Representation of the People Act, 1951 to allow Electoral Registration Officers to ask electors for their Aadhaar number on a voluntary basis, to authenticate roll entries and identify duplicate registrations; no entry may be deleted for failure to furnish it. Electors submit the number using Form 6B, and the ECI began collecting it from 1 August 2022.

==== Special Intensive Revision ====
Since June 2025 the ECI has carried out a phased Special Intensive Revision (SIR) of electoral rolls, beginning in Bihar, in which electors whose eligibility cannot be traced to an earlier roll must submit documents. In September 2025 the Supreme Court of India directed that Aadhaar be accepted as one such document, though not as proof of citizenship. A third phase covering 16 states and three union territories was announced in May 2026. Petitioners argued that the requirements could disenfranchise genuine voters, particularly migrants and marginalised groups. On 27 May 2026 the Supreme Court upheld the ECI's power to conduct the exercise and directed that persons deleted over doubtful citizenship have their cases referred to the competent authority.

=== Ireland ===
In Ireland, voters receive a polling card in advance of any election or referendum. While it is not necessary to bring this along to vote, voters are required to bring identification with them to vote. Acceptable forms of identification include passports (including Irish passport cards), driving licences, workplace identity cards (with a photograph), student identity cards (with a photograph), travel documents (with a photograph), Public Services Cards or a bank or credit union account book with an address in the constituency. If the individual does not have one of these, they can also present a cheque book or card, a credit card or birth or marriage certificate, together with proof of address in the constituency (e.g. a utility bill).

=== Israel ===
Similar to Germany, there is a national voters' database, and photo ID is required (identity card, passport or driving licence).

=== Italy ===
Italy requires voters to present a photo ID (ID card, driver license, passport) and a voter card ("Tessera elettorale"), which can also be issued on election day.

=== Luxembourg ===
In principle, Luxembourg requires voters to present their passport, identity card, residence permit or visa when voting. However, a derogation allows for this requirement to be waived if a member of staff at the polling station can personally vouch for the identity of the voter.

=== Mexico ===
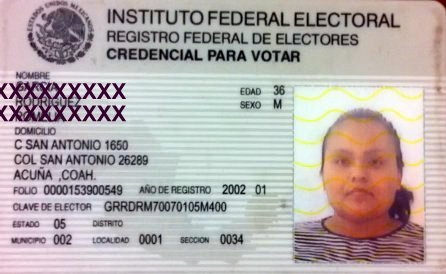
Mexican voter ID

In Mexico, voting is a voluntary right and is exercised protected by secrecy. Electoral laws are created by the federal government through the INE: National Electoral Institute (formerly IFE: Instituto Nacional Electoral 1990–2014). A free photo ID called the Voter Credential card is issued by right to all citizens of Mexico over the age of 18, but sometimes months prior. Being allowed to commence paperwork before turning 18 is decided upon the day and month of birth, and how it plays in the current year's electoral calendar, as the institute suspends all new registries several months prior to any election. This allows young Mexicans turning 18 within an inactive period to still enroll and guarantee their right to participate in the coming election. The full legal age in Mexico is 18 for both born and naturalized citizens.

The voter ID card was introduced in 1990 by the now inactive IFE as a tool to "properly identify electors in a country with a history of voters casting multiple ballots and curious vote counts resulting in charges of fraud." After 2014 the IFE was deemed permanently inactive due to minor constitutional reforms; therefore, the INE was simultaneously created. Although both institutes carry out almost exactly the same tasks and duties, this change allowed for yet further homogenization of elections in the country and opening way to what many Mexicans and members of the international community call the first ever legal elections in the country, in 2017. While there is no single official identity document in Mexico, the INE voter's ID is currently the most widely accepted identity document in the country for legal, commercial and financial purposes, making it a vital document for all Mexicans over the age of 18, and consequently broadening the chance for more citizens participating on election day.

=== Namibia ===
In Namibia, voter ID is needed to cast a ballot. Voter registration cards include a photo and evidence of citizenship.

=== Netherlands ===
The registration office of each municipality in the Netherlands maintains a registration of all residents. Every eligible voter receives a personal voting notification by mail some weeks before the election, indicating the voting stations in the voter's municipality. Voters must present their voting notification and a photo ID (passport, identity card, or drivers license (a passport or ID is mandatory from the age of 14)). Such photo ID may be expired, but not by more than five years.

=== New Zealand ===
Identification does not need to be presented when voting, or enrolling to vote, in elections in New Zealand. When voting, voters need to confirm their name, and sometimes their address and occupation, and will then be marked off the electoral roll. In more recent elections (such as in 2017 and 2020), Easyvote cards were mailed to enrolled voters to make the process faster.

=== Norway ===
Citizens must bring an ID to vote. A polling card or simply stating a name and date of birth is not sufficient. Voting is voluntary, but to be eligible for parliamentary elections, a person must be a Norwegian citizen, at least 18 years old, and either currently or previously registered as a resident in Norway's Population Register. Voting must take place at a polling station or a Norwegian embassy (for those abroad). Voters who cannot access a polling station due to illness or disability may apply to vote from home or another location. In such cases, an electoral officer will come to the voter, and the process will follow the same procedure as at a polling station.

Poland

Voting is voluntary in Poland, and citizens become eligible to vote at 18. At the age of 18, every citizen is issued a mandatory national photo ID, which has to be renewed every 10 years. At the polling station voters must provide either this ID or a valid Polish passport.

=== Sweden ===
When physically voting on election day or during early voting, every voter must provide a valid identification document (such as a passport, drivers license, or an international ID card, issued by the Swedish police). If a voter is missing valid identification, another person with valid ID-documents can certify the identity of the documentless voter.

=== Switzerland ===
There are up to three different ways to vote at the national and cantonal level in Switzerland: 1) directly at the polling station, bringing along the voting material sent by mail three to four weeks before election day; 2) postal voting, by following the instructions included in the voting material sent by mail; 3) voting online, offered in 10 cantons at the beginning of 2019, but not yet at the national level. E-voting is a contentious issue, particularly with regard to a projected digital ID, which raises concerns regarding confidentiality, security and verifiability.

=== United Kingdom ===
Photographic identification is mandatory to vote in elections in England and Northern Ireland, and in general elections since 2023.

In Scotland and Wales, there is no requirement to present photo ID, outside of general elections. Before any election, all eligible voters are sent a poll card by their local authority, but it is not a requirement to be in possession of a poll card to vote. Voters are asked to give their name and address at the polling station.

A voter ID trial was held for the 2018 United Kingdom local elections by the then Conservative government. Voters in five local authorities in England (Bromley, Gosport, Swindon, Watford and Woking) were required to show ID before voting. The legal basis for the trial was contested, but upheld in R (on the application of Coughlan) v Minister for the Cabinet Office.

Voter ID legislation was part of the 2021 Queen's Speech. In 2022, the Conservative government passed the Elections Act 2022. The Act introduces voter photo identification for in-person voting to Great Britain for the first time. The requirement applies to UK general elections, English local elections, and police and crime commissioner elections in England and Wales.

In June 2023, the UK Electoral Commission found that 14,000 people were turned away from voting during the local elections in May for not having a required form of ID. The Commission stated that there were "concerning" signs that voters with disabilities, unemployed people and people from particular ethnic groups could be disproportionately affected by the new ID rules. The Commission also carried out separate polling which found that 4% of people who did not vote did not because of the new ID rules; it estimated that at least 400,000 people could not or chose not to vote due to the new ID rules.

=== United States ===
Voter ID laws by state, as of August 2025: Photo ID required (strict) Photo ID requested (non-strict) Non-photo ID required (strict) Non-photo ID requested (non-strict) No ID required to vote on election day, photo ID may be used as an option on election day and may be the primary way voters register prior to the election. Alternate forms of identification may be allowed for those without a government issued photo ID.

Many states have some form of voter ID requirement, which has been allowed to stand by the Supreme Court. As of April 2023, nineteen states have a requirement for a photo ID.

Public opinion polls have shown broad support for voter ID laws among voters in the United States. A 2011 Rasmussen poll found that 75% of likely voters "believe voters should be required to show photo identification, such as a driver's license, before being allowed to vote." A 2012 Fox News poll produced similar results, revealing that 87% of Republicans, 74% of independent voters, and 52% of Democrats supported new voter ID laws. A 2021 Pew Research poll showed that 93% of Republicans and 61% of Democrats (Note: Figures include Independents who reported leaning towards either party.) favor requirements that voters show government-issued photo ID to vote.

== See also ==
- Voter invitation card
- Voter registration
- Biometric voter registration
