= Landlord and Tenant Act 1954 =

Act of the Parliament of the United Kingdom

Landlord and Tenant Act 1954 (Note: Section 70(1).)
- Act of Parliament
- Parliament of the United Kingdom
- Long title: An Act to provide security of tenure for occupying tenants under certain leases of residential property at low rents and for occupying sub-tenants of tenants under such leases; to enable tenants occupying property for business, professional or certain other purposes to obtain new tenancies in certain cases; to amend and extend the Landlord and Tenant Act, 1927, the Leasehold Property (Repairs) Act, 1938, and section eighty-four of the Law of Property Act, 1925; to confer jurisdiction on the County Court in certain disputes between landlords and tenants; to make provision for the termination of tenancies of derelict land; and for purposes connected with the matters aforesaid.
- Citation: 2 & 3 Eliz. 2. c. 56
- Territorial extent: England and Wales (Note: Section 70(3).)

Dates
- Royal assent: 30 July 1954
- Commencement: 1 October 1954 (Note: Section 70(2).)
Other legislation
Amends	Landlord and Tenant Act 1927; Leasehold Property (Repairs) Act 1938; Law of Property Act 1925
Amended by	Rent Act 1957; Crown Estate Act 1961; Leasehold Reform Act 1967; Rent Act 1968; Industry Act 1972; Statute Law (Repeals) Act 1974; Statute Law (Repeals) Act 1976; Rent Act 1977; Housing (Consequential Provisions) Act 1985; Coal Industry Act 1987; Coal Industry Act 1994; Landlord and Tenant (Covenants) Act 1995; Trusts of Land and Appointment of Trustees Act 1996; National Health Service (Consequential Provisions) Act 2006; Policing and Crime Act 2017; Digital Economy Act 2017

Status: Amended

Text of statute as originally enacted

Revised text of statute as amended

Text of the Landlord and Tenant Act 1954 as in force today (including any amendments) within the United Kingdom, from legislation.gov.uk.

The Landlord and Tenant Act 1954 (2 & 3 Eliz. 2. c. 56) is an act of the Parliament of the United Kingdom extending to England and Wales. Part I of the act (sections 1-21), which dealt with the protection of residential tenancies, is now largely superseded. Part II of the act (sections 22-46) is a statutory code governing business tenancies. Various other matters are covered in Parts III and IV.

Part II of the act gives business tenants a degree of security of tenure. A business tenant protected by the act may not be evicted simply by the giving of notice to quit or by the ending of a fixed term of the tenancy. The landlord must serve a notice on the tenant, stating which of the seven grounds of opposition they wish to rely upon to oppose a new tenancy.

== Applicability ==
Part II of the act applies to any tenancy where the property "is or includes premises which are occupied by the tenant and are so occupied for the purposes of a business carried on by him or for those and other purposes". There are some exceptions under the act, which are included in section 43. These include mining leases and agricultural premises. The act does not protect leases with a term of less than 6 months which hold no scope to renew. Both parties can agree not to be covered. Additionally, a tenancy granted by reason of employment by the grantor is excluded from the act, providing that there is clear agreement in writing which states the purpose of the tenancy.

== Case law ==
In Graysim Holdings Ltd v P.& O. Property Holdings Ltd., the House of Lords considered the situation of a lease of a market hall to a tenant who then let individual market stalls to market traders. The question considered was whether the tenant could take advantage of the protection offered by the act. The House of Lords decided that the tenant could not be said to occupy the premises for the purposes of the business that was being carried on there by the market traders.

This decision was followed in Bassairi Limited v London Borough of Camden, where the tenant let out the bulk of the premises as furnished apartments. Again, it was held that the tenant did not occupy for the purposes of a business.

Esselte AB v Pearl Assurance plc in 1997 established that when a tenant ceases to occupy the property for business purposes then their security of tenure will cease.

== Amendments ==
The 1954 act was amended by the Regulatory Reform (Business Tenancies) (England and Wales) Order 2003 (SI 2003/3096), which was made on 1 December 2003 and came into effect on 1 June 2004. This order was adopted under the UK's regulatory reform agenda, which aimed at removing legislative burdens on businesses. The order implemented many of the recommendations of a Law Commission report of 1992 on business tenancies. The main changes adopted under this order were:

- Where landlords are proposing to renew a tenancy under section 25 of the act they must state their proposed rent and other terms
- the previous requirement for a tenant to serve a counter-notice was withdrawn
- tenancies can be extended at the continuing existing rent
- either landlord or tenant can apply to a court for an interim rent, and
- a contracting-out procedure which existed under section 38(1) of the act was abolished.

A consultation draft for a revised form of section 25 notice was issued in January 2004. This required a landlord to set out the terms proposed for the new lease: without the inclusion of proposed terms, the notice would not be valid. Lawyer Malcolm Dowden commented that landlords who simply wanted a section 25 notice "to contain a wish list of terms" would need to beware, arguing that a 2003 court ruling in Mount Cook v Rosen, which addressed the meaning of the term "proposal" as used in the Leasehold Reform, Housing and Urban Development Act 1993, was likely to be applied in Landlord and Tenant Act cases. This would require "proposed terms" to be read as "realistic" terms or terms based on expert valuation advice.

== Reform ==
In December 2024, the Law Commission published an initial consultation on reforming Part 2 of the Act. The consultation was open from 19 November 2024 to 19 February 2025 and received more than 160 responses. The Commission provisionally concluded that the existing model should be retained but that the six-month threshold should be increased.

== Subsequent developments ==
Sections 45 and 68(1) of, and schedule 7 to, the act were repealed by section 1 of, and part XI of the schedule to, the Statute Law (Repeals) Act 1974, which came into force on 27 June 1974.

== See also ==
- English land law
- Rent regulation
- Rent regulation in England and Wales
