= Commonhold and Leasehold Reform Act 2002 =

Act of the Parliament of the United Kingdom

Commonhold and Leasehold Reform Act 2002 (Note: Section 183.)
- Act of Parliament
- Parliament of the United Kingdom
- Long title: An Act to make provision about commonhold land and to amend the law about leasehold property.
- Citation: 2002 c.15
- Territorial extent: England and Wales (Note: Section 182.)

Dates
- Royal assent: 1 May 2002
- Commencement: Various (Note: Section 181.)
Other legislation
Amends	Law of Property Act 1922; Land Registration Act 1925; Law of Property Act 1925; Leasehold Reform Act 1967; Land Compensation Act 1973; Housing Act 1980; Limitation Act 1980; Housing Act 1985; Landlord and Tenant Act 1985; Insolvency Act 1986; Landlord and Tenant Act 1987; Local Government and Housing Act 1989; Tribunals and Inquiries Act 1992; Leasehold Reform, Housing and Urban Development Act 1993; Law of Property (Miscellaneous Provisions) Act 1994; Trusts of Land and Appointment of Trustees Act 1996; Housing Act 1996; Housing Grants, Construction and Regeneration Act 1996

Status: Amended

Text of statute as originally enacted

Revised text of statute as amended

The Commonhold and Leasehold Reform Act 2002 (c. 15) is an act of the Parliament of the United Kingdom. It introduced commonhold, a new way of owning land similar to the Australian strata title or the American condominium, into English and Welsh law. Part 1 deals with commonhold and part 2 deals with leasehold reform. Some supplementary material is covered in part 3.

Commonholds were introduced to deal with the perceived unfairness of the existing leasehold system, and England and Wales being unique in not offering a legal option for ownership of common areas of shared buildings. It gives leaseholders the right to manage their properties more actively, by taking control of some rights otherwise held by the freeholder. Commonhold ownership has not become popular, and in 2018 the Law Commission launched a consultation into ways to expand usage of commonhold estates.

== See also ==
- Leasehold estate
- Leasehold Reform Act 1967
- Leasehold valuation tribunal
