= Leasehold Reform Act 1967 =

Act of the Parliament of the United Kingdom

Leasehold Reform Act 1967 (Note: Section 41(1).)
- Act of Parliament
- Parliament of the United Kingdom
- Long title: An Act to enable tenants of houses held on long leases at low rents to acquire the freehold or an extended lease; to apply the Rent Acts to premises held on long leases at a rackrent, and to bring the operation of the Landlord and Tenant Act 1954 into conformity with the Rent Acts as so amended; to make other changes in the law in relation to premises held on long leases, including amendments of the Places of Worship (Enfranchisement) Act 1920; and for purposes connected therewith.
- Citation: 1967 c. 88
- Territorial extent: England and Wales (Note: Section 41(3).)

Dates
- Royal assent: 27 October 1967
- Commencement: 27 October 1967 (sections 34–36, part III); 27 November 1967 (part II); (part II); (Note: Section 41(5).)
Other legislation
Amends	Places of Worship (Enfranchisement) Act 1920; Reserve and Auxiliary Forces (Protection of Civil Interests') Act 1951; Landlord and Tenant Act 1954; Rent Act 1957; Rent Act 1965
Amended by	Rent Act 1968; Statute Law (Repeals) Act 1976; Housing (Consequential Provisions) Act 1985; Statute Law (Repeals) Act 1993; Trusts of Land and Appointment of Trustees Act 1996; Statute Law (Repeals) Act 1998; Land Registration Act 2002; Commonhold and Leasehold Reform Act 2002; Mental Capacity Act 2005; National Health Service (Consequential Provisions) Act 2006; Charities Act 2011; Infrastructure Act 2015; Policing and Crime Act 2017

Status: Amended

Text of statute as originally enacted

Revised text of statute as amended

Text of the Leasehold Reform Act 1967 as in force today (including any amendments) within the United Kingdom, from legislation.gov.uk.

The Leasehold Reform Act 1967 (c. 88) is an act of the Parliament of the United Kingdom, which concerns English land law and compulsory purchase. A government bill, the law remains largely intact. It was passed by both Houses and had been tabled by ministers of the Labour government, 1964–1970.

== Provisions ==
The act grants the right to long leaseholders of houses let at low and moderately low rents to buy their homes compulsorily from their landlords at a fair price.

Initially the 1967 act applied only to homes below these rateable values: £400 p.a. in London and £200 p.a. elsewhere (thus targeting low-to-middle income homeowners); the reform coincided with lower wages becoming less of a bar to access to loans from major mortgage lenders. The act has since been amended on a number of occasions to expand these rights, to homeowners having higher rateable values.

Tenants had the choice to purchase a freehold or extend their lease by 50 years under the act.

== Background ==
English law and lending eschews the concept of flying freehold entire properties, such as flats. The solution was to set up a standard model of any flat ownership based on landlord and tenant but which is not seen in much of Europe where a more commonhold system of ownership is common, as long-term flat owners wish to gain a greater than 'transient' or 'time-barred' interest in their home. Such long leases were already in use in housing, as before purpose-built apartments were built, an aristocratic or other large capitalist landlord could co-steer the successful, competitive development of their urban estates; these took the initial form of "building leases" then leases to allow the flexibility of the landlord deciding whether to create apartments, extensions, shorter-term lettings all of which liberties have been tempered by law or by secured lending codes to enhance the status of long-term lessees. The dozen or so private great collections of reversions continue the landlord-tenant relation with piecemeal reductions, across the Central London grander residential zones, in the leasehold valuation tribunals referred to as "Prime Central London".

== See also ==
- Commonhold and Leasehold Reform Act 2002
- Compulsory purchase
- Director of Buildings and Lands v Shun Fung Ironworks Ltd [1995] UKPC 7
- English land law
- Re Ellenborough Park [1955] EWCA Civ 4, [1956] Ch 131

== Bibliography ==
- K Gray and SF Gray, Land Law (7th edn 2011) Ch 11
- K Gray and S Gray, ‘Private Property and Public Propriety’, in J McLean (ed), Property and the Constitution (Hart 1999) 36-7
