= Wardleworth =

Former civil parish in Manchester, England

Coordinates: 53.6276°N 2.1532°W

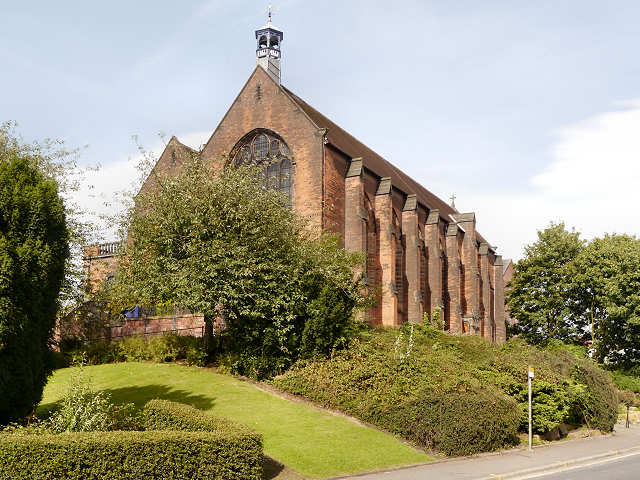

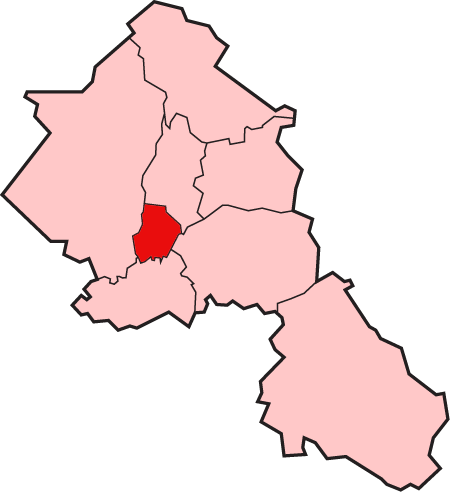
- Wardleworth shown within the parish of Rochdale
- Population
  - 1830: 6,451
  - 1891: 19,238
- History
  - Abolished: 1894
  - Succeeded by: County Borough of Rochdale
- Status: Township (? - 1894), Civil parish (1866–94)
  - HQ: Buckley

Wardleworth was a township at the geographic centre of the parish of Rochdale, in Salford hundred, Lancashire (now Greater Manchester), England and later a separate civil parish. The principal estate of the township was Buckley. Though the administrative territory has long been abolished, the name continues as a geographic reference frame for that part of Rochdale.

Wardleworth was a township that included territory to the northeast of the town of Rochdale, including the hamlets of Buckley, Crankey Shaw and Hamer Fold, and, although close to the village of Wardle, Wardleworth did not contain the settlement, which was instead within the neighbouring township of Wuerdle and Wardle.

The Buckley and Entwistle families are recorded to have been the principal landowners of this township, with Buckley Hall being the seat of the estate holders for many years.

== History ==
Wardleworth was formerly a township in the parish of Rochdale, in 1866 Wardleworth became a separate civil parish, in 1894 the parish was abolished to form Rochdale. In 1891 the parish had a population of 19,238.

== See also ==
- Butterworth (ancient township)
- Wardleworth railway station
