= Buckley =

Buckley may refer to:

== Businesses ==
- Buckley's, a Canadian pharmaceutical corporation
- Buckley Aircraft, an American aircraft manufacturer
- Buckley Broadcasting, an American broadcasting company

== Places ==
=== United Kingdom ===
- Buckley, Greater Manchester, England
- Buckley, Flintshire, Wales
- Buckley Barracks, a military barracks in Wiltshire, England

=== United States ===
- Buckley, Illinois
- Buckley, Michigan
- Buckley, Washington
- Buckley Creek, a river in Nebraska
- Buckley Island, Ohio River, West Virginia
- Buckley Space Force Base, a military base in Aurora, Colorado

=== Other places ===
- Buckley Bay (Antarctica)
- Buckley Island (Antarctica)
- Buckley, Victoria, Australia
- Buckley River Important Bird Area, Queensland, Australia
- Buckley Bay, British Columbia, Canada
  - Buckley Bay station
- Buckley Park, a stadium in Kilkenny, Ireland

== People and fictional characters ==
- Buckley (name), includes people and fictional characters
- List of people with surname Buckley

== Schools in the United States ==
- Buckley School (California)
- Buckley School (New York City)
- Buckley Country Day School, Roslyn, New York

== Ships ==
- Buckley-class destroyer escort
  - USS Buckley, lead ship of the class, in commission from 1943 to 1946
- USS Dennis J. Buckley (DE-553), a destroyer escort canceled in 1944
- USS Dennis J. Buckley (DD-808), a destroyer in commission from 1945 to 1973

== See also ==
- Buckley & Nunn, a store in Melbourne, Victoria, Australia
- Buckley & Taylor, a British engineering company
