= Buckley (name) =

Buckley – Ó Buachalla
- Pronunciation: Irish (/oː bˠuːaxal̪ˠl̪ˠa/) Old English (/bʌkliː/)

Origin
- Meaning: Irish: buachall meaning boy Old English: bucc and leah meaning goat and wood
- Region of origin: Ireland and England

Buckley is a surname, first recorded in England in the 13th Century with separate English and Irish origins, the latter anglicised to Buckley, It is common in both countries, as well as Canada and the United States.

Being two separate names originally, the Irish name was anglicised to Buckley at a later date. The Irish name origin, The English Surname and placename Old English origin.

Spelling variations include Bucklie, Buckly, Bulkley, Buhilly, Ó Buachalla, and Boughla.

== Origins ==
The English surname is credited by some unknown sources as being of Old English origin, either as a habitation surname derived from settlements named Buckley, Buckleigh or Bugley, or as an occupational surname from the Anglo-Saxon words Bucc and Leah, meaning goat and wood.

A branch of the Buckley family lived in Buckley in Rochdale, England for many centuries. They gave their name to Buckley Hall, a manor house found within the locality. Their name is said to derive from "bleak hill" and they can be traced back to a "Geoffrey de Buckley".

In Ireland, Ó Buachalla, taken from the Irish word 'buachaill' originally meaning 'herdsman' (in modern Irish it has come to mean 'boy'), was anglicised early as Ó Boughelly, Boughla, Buhilly and later as Buckley.

The German surnames Büchle and Bücheli have been anglicised as Buckley.

== Notable Buckleys ==
People and fictional characters with the name include:

=== Surname ===
- List of people with surname Buckley

=== Given name ===
- Buckley Belanger (born 1960), Canadian politician
- Buckley Machin (1901–1963), Australian politician
- P. Buckley Moss (1933–2024), American painter
- Buckley Roderick (1862–1908), Welsh solicitor and international rugby union forward

=== Fictional characters ===
- Buckley, a dog in The Royal Tenenbaums
- Buckley (King of the Hill)
- Evan Buckley, or Buck, from 9-1-1
- Robin Buckley, from Stranger Things
- Buckley, an Irish soldier in the British army during the Crimean War, who features in Joyce's novel Finnegans Wake

== See also ==
- List of Old English (Anglo-Saxon) surnames
- Buckley (disambiguation)
- Buckby (surname)
- Buckbee
