= Buckley, Greater Manchester =

Suburb of Rochdale, Greater Manchester, England

Buckley
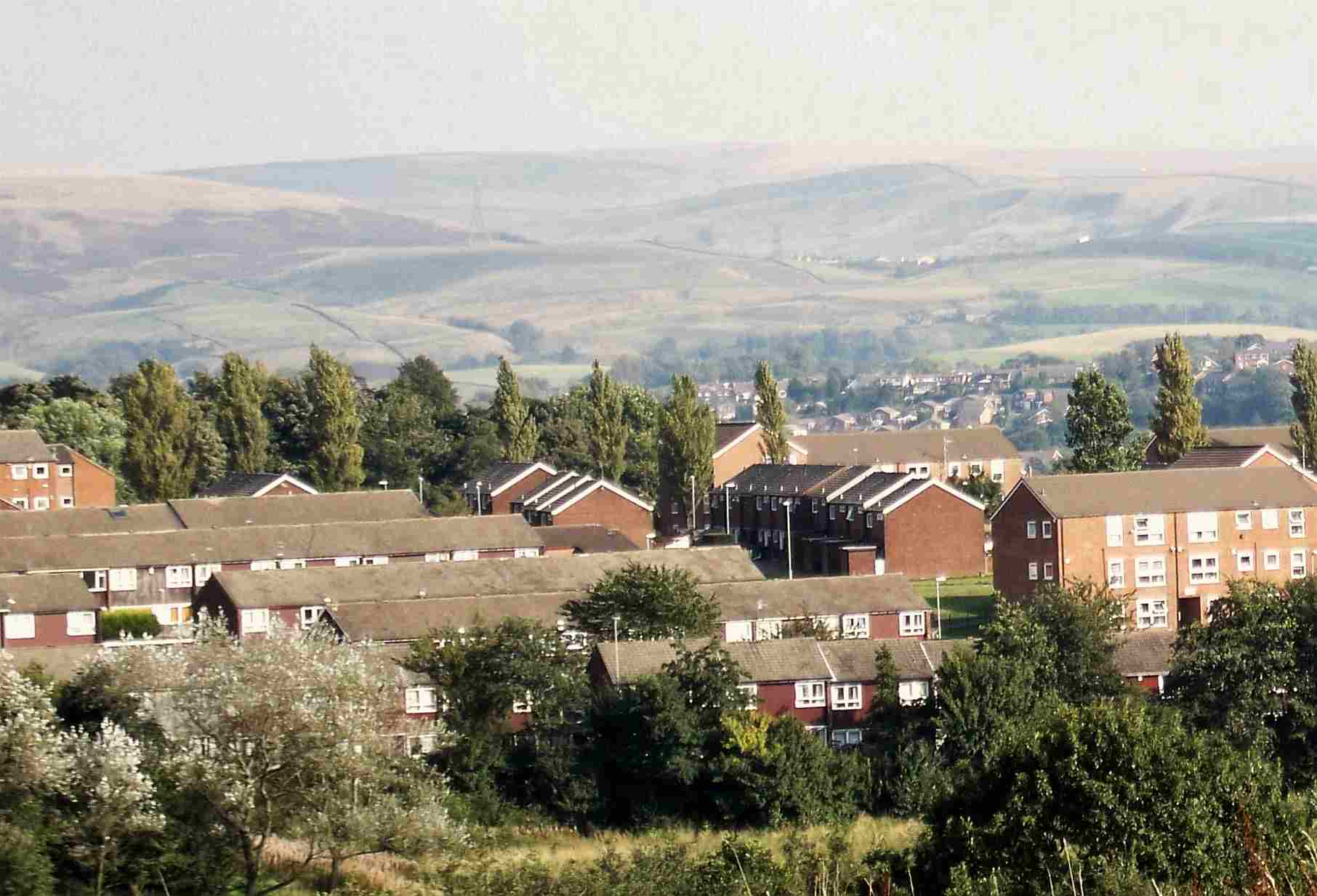
- A view over Buckley towards the South Pennines

- Location within Greater Manchester
- OS grid reference: SD906150
  - London: 170 mi (270 km) SSE
- Metropolitan borough: Rochdale
- Metropolitan county: Greater Manchester
- Region: North West
- Country: England
- Sovereign state: United Kingdom
- Post town: ROCHDALE
- Postcode district: OL12
- Dialling code: 01706
- Police: Greater Manchester
- Fire: Greater Manchester
- Ambulance: North West
- UK Parliament: Rochdale

Buckley is a suburban area within the Metropolitan Borough of Rochdale, in Greater Manchester, England. It lies at the northern fringe of Rochdale, along the course of Buckley Brook, "upon an eminence of ground" by the South Pennines. It is 1.2 miles (1.9 km) south-southwest of the village of Wardle and 1.3 miles (2.1 km) north-northeast of Rochdale's town centre. Buckley spans a watercourse, a prison, farmland and residential properties.

Buckley emerged as a constituent community of the manor of Hundersfield following the Anglo-Saxon settlement of Britain. Although the name Buckley is of Old English derivation, the settlement's medieval history is tied closely to a Norman family who were granted the estate as a gift for their services given in the Norman conquest of England; they subsequently adopted the surname 'de Buckley'. Members of the Buckleys of Buckley family appear throughout the High Middle Ages in legal charters related to Buckley, the surrounding area, and its manor house Buckley Hall.

Throughout the Late Middle Ages and the Early Modern Period, Buckley was the principal estate of the township of Wardleworth. The Buckleys of Buckley Hall continued to hold positions of regional importance, such as priests, gentry and military officers, but their size and influence diminished through death and migration prompting the obsolescence of the Buckley estate. Industrialisation resulted in the neighbouring town of Rochdale to encroach on Buckley; the area was absorbed into the Municipal Borough of Rochdale in the 1870s.

Although continuously occupied and revamped during the 18th and 19th centuries, Buckley Hall became unoccupied in the 1880s. The Brothers of Charity, an institute of the Catholic Church, successfully agitated for the purchase of Buckley Hall and its conversion into an orphanage for Catholic boys. The orphanage was operational from 1888 until 1947. The original building was demolished in the early-1990s and HM Prison Buckley Hall was opened in its place.

== History ==
Buckley emerged as a settlement following the Anglo-Saxon settlement of Britain in the Early Middle Ages. The name Buckley is derived from the Old English term æblæc hlæw, which translates as "bleak hill". This Old English term became corrupted to "Blakelow", and then into the variants of "Bucklegh", "Bulkey", "Bukklegh", and "Bucley" before settling on "Buckley".

The medieval hamlet of Buckley lay within the Anglo-Saxon manor of Hundersfield, in the parish of Rochdale. It remained in obscurity until the 11th century, when it is believed that Normans loyal to William the Conqueror were given the estate as a reward for their services given during the Norman conquest of England. It is from this exchange that the "ancient" and "local" family of Buckley — the progenitors of the Buckley surname in North West England — was founded. "Geoffrey de Buckley" is the earliest known member of the Buckley family, who appeared during the 12th century in charters relating to Stanlow Abbey, Whalley Abbey and land exchange in and around the hamlet of Buckley. Although Buckley is a term of Old English derivation, the given name Geoffrey is of Old French origin, and the use of the nobiliary particle 'de' indicates the Norman origins of the Buckley family. Geoffrey de Buckley served as the Dean of Whalley, and his nephew, also called Geoffrey de Buckley, was killed at the Battle of Evesham in 1265 and is commemorated in windows at Worcester Cathedral and Lichfield Cathedral.

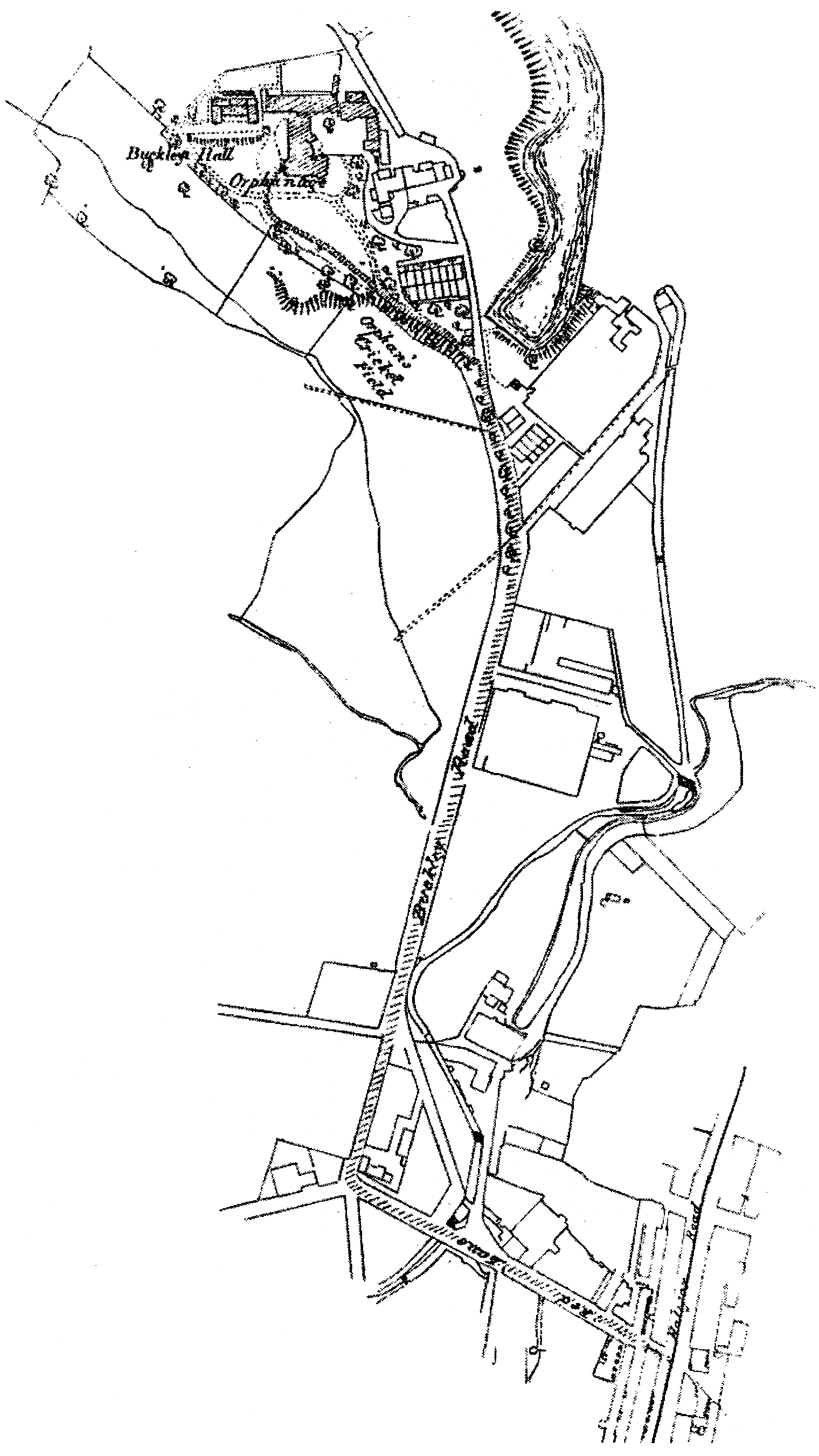
Buckley, as mapped by the Ordnance Survey between 1888 and 1947.

At the centre of the Buckley estate was a watermill used for grinding grain, which existed at least as early as 1335, and Buckley Hall, which first appears in written records in a description dated 1626. Buckley Hall was noted as a "faire mansion house", and was owned by a family or families surnamed Buckley, after the locality. The Buckleys of Buckley used Buckley Hall as a chapel and residence and continued to have influence over local and regional affairs as priests, yeomen, esquires and other gentry into the Early Modern Period; Geoffrey Buckley of Buckley was the Rector of St Alban's Church in London during the 1470s, and John Buckley of Buckley, son of Abel, was a Lieutenant Colonel with the Roundheads at the Siege of Lathom House during the English Civil War. When the manor of Hundersfield was abolished and its territory subdivided amongst new townships, Buckley Hall and its surrounding area fell within the bounds of Wardleworth. Buckley appears to have been the "principal estate" of Wardleworth and encompassed land in the outlying areas of Foxholes and Fieldhouse. The main line of the Buckley family continued to own Buckley Hall and its estates, while other members founded new families in Saddleworth, and Shaw and Crompton. The lineal descendants of the Buckleys of Buckley gradually diminished in number and influence through death and migration; the last member of the main branch of the Buckleys of Buckley was a Captain William Buckley. In 1722, Captain Buckley had a lethal dispute with Major Samuel Crooke, the High Sheriff of Lancashire, regarding a right of way in Higher Walton, Lancashire. Buckley and Cooke entered a duel at Rochdale in which Cooke was killed. Buckley was tried at the assizes in Lancaster and found guilty of manslaughter, but received "only a light sentence". He died in 1730.

The demise of the Buckleys of Buckley, combined with the urbanisation of the expanding market town of Rochdale, brought about the gradual obsolescence of the Buckley estate. Buckley Hall passed from Captain William Buckley to his nephew Thomas Foster (who assumed the surname of Buckley), and his son, Edward Buckley, who in 1786 sold the hall and estate to Robert Entwisle. Although by 1626 a "considerable part of the town of Rochdale was built on the southern side of Wardleworth", the industrialisation of Rochdale advanced its encroachment upon the bounds of Buckley. In 1825 part of Wardleworth was included in the area of the commissioners for the improvement of the town of Rochdale, and an act of parliament in 1839 allowed Rochdale's Water Works Company to construct a reservoir in Buckley to supply water to Rochdale. Buckley Wood Reservoir was completed in December 1841 and held 24,271,312 imperial gallons (110,339,570 L; 29,148,630 US gal) of water. By 1851 Rochdale had expanded well into the bounds of Wardleworth, and in 1872 the remaining area of Wardleworth was subsumed into the Municipal Borough of Rochdale, effectively abolishing Wardleworth and bringing Buckley entirely into the bounds of Rochdale.

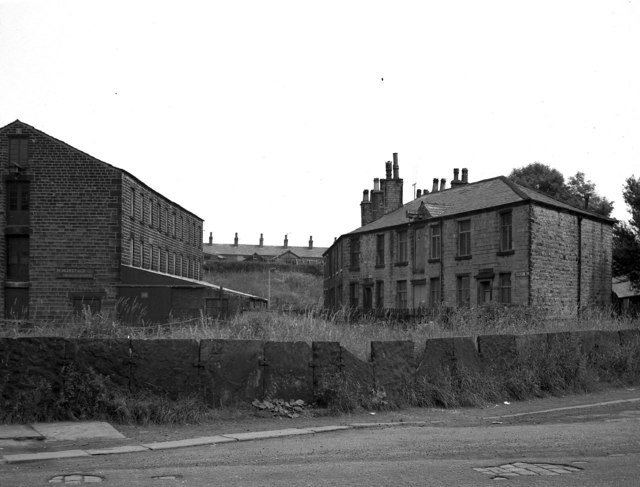
Buckley Mill (right), seen here in 1968, was part of a Victorian era factory complex in Buckley.

Although the Buckley family was said to be one of the founders of the cotton trade in the area, industrial scale textile processing was introduced to Buckley with the construction of Buckley Mills. Buckley became "a Victorian ensemble of a mill, workers' housing" and Buckley Hall as "the mill owners house", which in 1860 fell to the Schofields, a family of merchants and traders. Buckley Mills were visited by Henry Pelham-Clinton, 6th Duke of Newcastle in September 1873. Buckley Hall was demolished in the 1860s by the Schofields and rebuilt "to the highest standards of comfort and opulence for the time ... four storeys high of red brick with yellow brick arches in an Italianate style with an Elizabethan bow". However, in 1882 Buckley Hall became unoccupied as a result of William Schofield's death, and stayed unoccupied until brought to the attention of Herbert Vaughan and the Roman Catholic Diocese of Salford in 1887. Buckley Hall was found to be suitable for conversion into an orphanage and Poor Law School operated by the Brothers of Charity, a Catholic institute from Ghent in Belgium. Buckley Hall Orphanage officially opened on 19 March 1888 with 28 Catholic boys in residence. Construction of Eclipse Mill at Buckley began in 1899.

== Geography ==
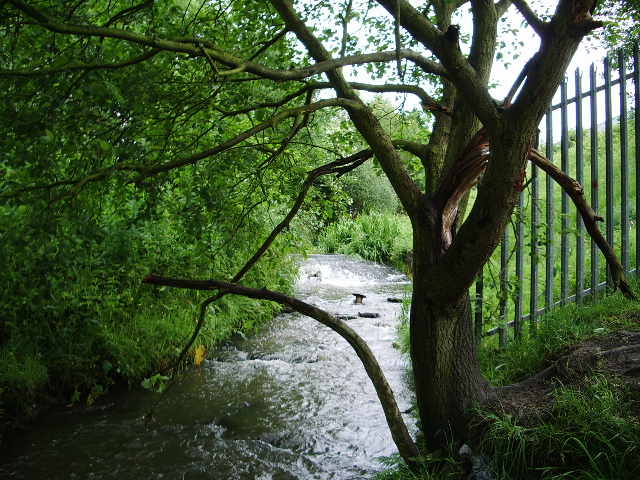
Buckley Brook is a watercourse in Buckley, and a tributary of the Hey Brook, which in turn is a tributary of the River Roch.

Buckley lies along the northern edge of both Rochdale, and the Greater Manchester Urban Area, "upon an eminence of ground" at the foothills of the South Pennines. It is located at 53°37′52″N 2°8′31″W (53.6312°, -2.1421°), which is 11.1 miles (17.9 km) north-northeast of Manchester city centre and 170 miles (274 km) north-northwest of central London. The A58 road runs southeast-to-northwest along the southern edge of Buckley. The Buckley Brook runs southerly along Buckley's eastern fringe until it discharges into Hey Brook, a tributary of the River Roch. Buckley Brook is so named because it passes through Buckley.

There is a mixture of suburbs, semi-rural and rural locations in Buckley—which has no formal boundary—and is fringed by Great Howarth (to the northeast), Low Hill and Smallbridge (to the east), Howarth Cross (to the southeast), Fieldhouse and Wardleworth (to the south), Cronkeyshaw and Foxholes (to the southwest), Nook Farm (to the west), Healey (to the north east), and Birchin Head and rural land (to the north). Foxholes and Fieldhouse have been documented as being a part of Buckley.

== Governance ==
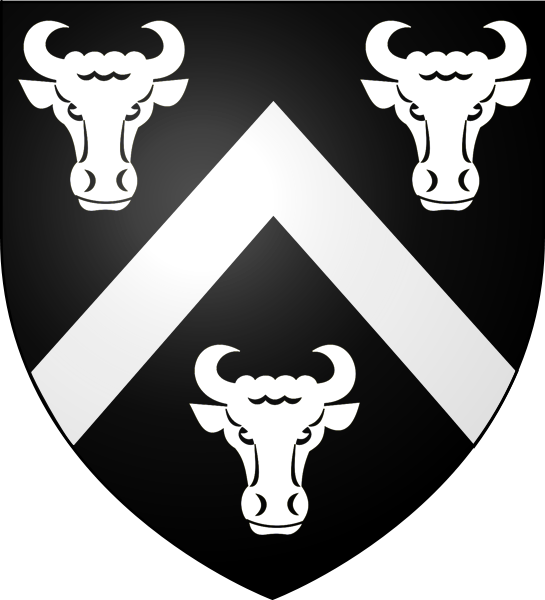
The coat of arms of Buckley of Buckley, the area's ruling family following the Norman conquest. The heraldic description is given as "Sable a cheveron between three bulls' heads cabossed argent".

In the Early Middle Ages, Buckley was governed as a part of the Anglo-Saxon manor of Hundersfield in the Rochdale ecclesiastical parish and hundred of Salford. Following the Norman conquest of England, Buckley fell into Norman ownership, and was governed as a private estate consisting of "messuage and lands" held by the 'de Buckley' family. In 1576, Buckley was described as a "manor", still held by the Buckleys of Buckley, albeit under the overlordship of Sir John Byron, Jr. When Hundersfield was subdivided into townships, Buckley became part of Wardleworth township in the county of Lancashire; east of watercourse of Buckley Brook was Wardleworth's boundary with Wuerdle and Wardle.

In 1825, well after the demise of the Buckleys of Buckley, part of Wardleworth was included in the area of the police commissioners who were tasked with the improvement of the encroaching market town of Rochdale. In 1872 the remaining area of Wardleworth became part of the Municipal Borough of Rochdale; Buckley became Rochdale's northeastern boundary with the Wardle Urban District in 1894. Local governance continued on this basis until after the Local Government Act 1972, when in 1974, the then County Borough of Rochdale was abolished and replaced by the Metropolitan Borough of Rochdale, a local government district of Greater Manchester.

Buckley falls within the Rochdale constituency in the House of Commons, currently represented in parliament by the Labour and Co-operative Party MP Paul Waugh MP.

== Landmarks ==
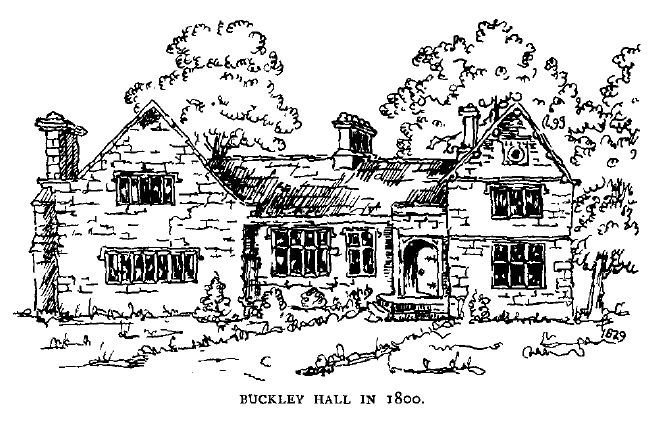
An illustration of Buckley Hall as it appeared in 1800. The hall was a mansion house of ancient origin, located in the heart of Buckley.

Buckley Hall and has been the only significant landmark in Buckley. It first makes an appearance in record in a written description dated 1626, but was at that time noted as being an ancient hall. It held a collection of vertu until it was dispersed in 1884. The Brothers of Charity, an institute of the Catholic Church, successfully agitated for the purchase of Buckley Hall and its conversion into an orphanage for Catholic boys. The orphanage was operational from 1888, until 1947.

As a means to replace "crumbling Victorian prisons", and to cope with an increasingly large prison population of England and Wales, the government of the United Kingdom turned to the private sector and gave contracts to companies for the operation of private prisons. HM Prison Buckley Hall was the fourth privately managed prison in the United Kingdom, and the first privatised Category C establishment holding medium security prisoners. Between 1966 and 1989 it operated as a senior detention centre. It reopened in 1994 before a demolition of the Buckley Hall mansion and rebuilding programme took place. The present prison buildings opened in 1995. In 2002, HMP Buckley Hall reopened as a prison for female offenders; the first prisoners arrived in April that year. As a result of increases in the size of Britain's male prison population, HMP Buckley Hall was reverted to a male Category C prison in September 2005 with prisoners arriving in December 2005. In 2009, HMP Buckley Hall had a maximum prisoner capacity of 381.

== Public services ==
Buckley is policed by the Greater Manchester Police force, and falls within the Healey community area of Rochdale North. Rochdale Police Station is the closest police station. Statutory emergency fire and rescue service is provided by the Greater Manchester Fire and Rescue Service, from fire stations at Rochdale and Littleborough. Hospital services are provided by The Pennine Acute Hospitals NHS Trust who provide an accident and emergency (CLOSING in April 2011) service at Rochdale Infirmary and Mental Health Services are provided by Pennine Care NHS Foundation Trust at Birch Hill Hospital. Community health services, including GPs, district and community nurses, dentists and pharmacists, are co-ordinated by NHS Heywood, Middleton and Rochdale. Waste management is co-ordinated by the Greater Manchester Waste Disposal Authority, which is a statutory waste disposal authority. Buckley's Distribution Network Operator for electricity is Electricity North West Ltd. United Utilities manages Buckley's drinking and waste water.
