= Rochdale Way =

Walking route in Greater Manchester, England

Coordinates: 53.6341°N 2.0925°W

The Rochdale Way is a circular 45-mile (72 km) walking route around the Metropolitan Borough of Rochdale in Greater Manchester, England, which provides a view of the scenery and buildings of the area.

Areas covered include the following:

- Hollingworth Lake
- Blackstone Edge on the Pennine Way
- Watergrove Reservoir
- Healey Dell
- Knowl Hill
- Naden Valley
- Queen's Park in Heywood
- Rhodes
- Alkrington
- Middleton
- Hopwood
- Tandle Hill
- Piethorne Valley

== Bibliography ==
- The Rochdale Way by Richard Catlow, John Cole and Martin Riley
