= Borough of Rochdale =

Borough of Rochdale may refer to three things associated with Rochdale, England:

- Metropolitan Borough of Rochdale, a current borough of Greater Manchester, covering the town of Rochdale and the surrounding area
  - Rochdale Borough Council, local government for the current borough
- County Borough of Rochdale (1856–1974), former local government district of Lancashire, covering just the town of Rochdale
