= Globe Inn =

Globe Inn may refer to:

- Globe Inn, Wardle, a listed pub in Greater Manchester, England
- Globe Inn, Washington, Pennsylvania, a former inn and tavern in the United States
