= Dearnaley =

Dearnaley is an English surname. Notable people with the surname include:

- George Dearnaley (born 1969), South African soccer player
- Irvine Dearnaley (1877–1965), British cricketer

== See also ==
- Dearnley
