= St John the Baptist's Church, Smallbridge =

Coordinates: 53.6338°N 2.1320°W

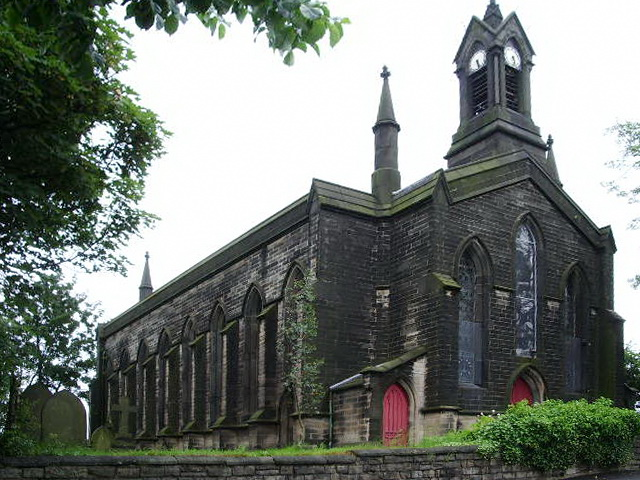
- St John the Baptist's Church, Smallbridge, from the northwest

- Location in Greater Manchester
- OS grid reference: SD 914,153
- Location: Halifax Road, Smallbridge, Rochdale, Greater Manchester
- Country: England
- Denomination: Anglican
- Website: St John, Smallbridge

History
- Status: Parish church
- Dedication: Saint John the Baptist

Architecture
- Functional status: Redundant
- Heritage designation: Grade II
- Designated: 29 June 1966
- Architect: Lewis Vulliamy
- Architectural type: Church
- Style: Gothic Revival
- Completed: 1834

Specifications
- Materials: Stone, slate roof

Administration
- Province: York
- Diocese: Manchester
- Archdeaconry: Rochdale
- Deanery: Rochdale
- Parish: Wardle and Smallbridge

Clergy
- Vicar: Revd Andrew J. Howell

St John the Baptist's Church is in Halifax Road, Smallbridge, Rochdale, Greater Manchester, England. It is a redundant Anglican parish church in the benefice of Wardle and Smallbridge, the deanery of Rochdale, the archdeaconry of Rochdale, and the diocese of Manchester. The church is recorded in the National Heritage List for England as a designated Grade II listed building. It was a Commissioners' church, having received a grant towards its construction from the Church Building Commission.

== History ==
St John's was built in 1834 to a design by Lewis Vulliamy. A grant of £3,253 (equivalent to £370,000 as of 2025) was given towards its construction by the Church Building Commission. The church was declared redundant in March 2008 due to a declining congregation

== Architecture ==
The church is constructed in ashlar stone with a slate roof. Its architectural style is Gothic Revival. The plan consists of an eight-bay nave with a projection at the west end, and a single-bay chancel with a vestry. The projection at the west end contains three stepped lancet windows with a doorway under the central window. On each side is a low porch. Rising from the gable is a tall bellcote with columns at the corners and louvred bell openings on each side. Above these is a clock face on each side under a gable. On the summit of the bellcote is a finial. In the corners between the projection and the nave are pinnacles with conical roofs and cross finials, and there is a similar pinnacle at the east end. Along the sides of the church, each bay contains a lancet window. The east window has four lights. Inside the church are galleries carried on cast iron columns. Over the chancel arch is a painting of a choir of angels. The furniture is described as "fine and ornately carved timberwork of various dates", and includes pews with poppyheads, and a hooded priest's chair with a misericord. The stained glass includes an 18th-century roundel by William Wailes.

== See also ==
- List of churches in Greater Manchester
- List of Commissioners' churches in Northeast and Northwest England
- Listed buildings in Wardle, Greater Manchester
