= Smallbridge =

Smallbridge may refer to:

- Smallbridge, Greater Manchester, England
- Smallbridge, Suffolk, England
