= Larrabee, Wisconsin =

- Town
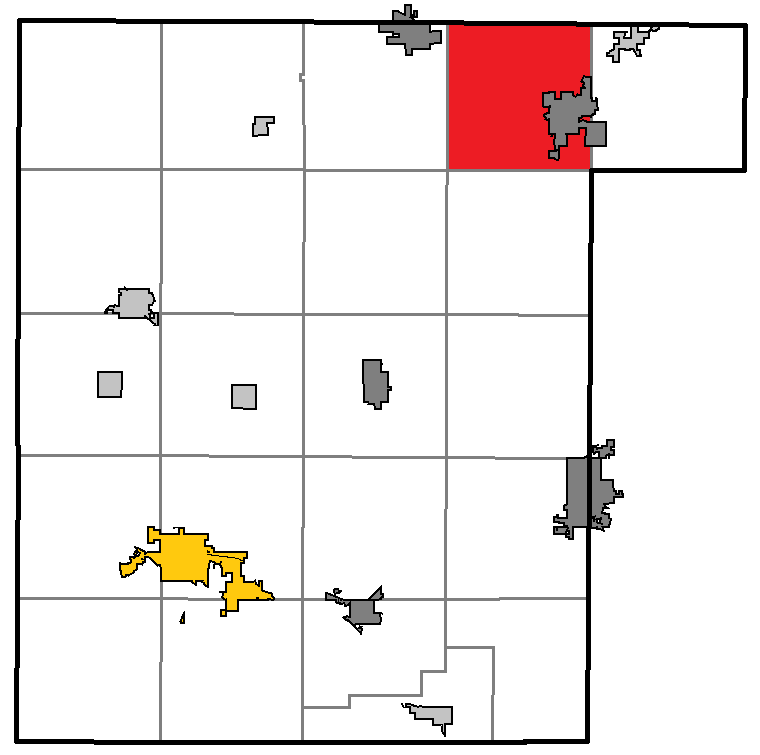
- Location of Larrabee, within Waupaca County
- Coordinates: 44°38′3″N 88°47′52″W
- Country: United States
- State: Wisconsin
- County: Waupaca

Area
  - Total: 33.6 sq mi (87.0 km^{2})
  - Land: 33.4 sq mi (86.4 km^{2})
  - Water: 0.23 sq mi (0.6 km^{2})
- Elevation: 833 ft (254 m)

Population (2020)
  - Total: 1,286
  - Density: 38.6/sq mi (14.9/km^{2})
- Time zone: UTC-6 (Central (CST))
  - Summer (DST): UTC-5 (CDT)
- FIPS code: 55-42650
- GNIS feature ID: 1583531
- Website: https://www.townoflarrabeewi.com/

Larrabee is a town in Waupaca County, Wisconsin, United States. The population was 1,286 at the 2020 census. The unincorporated community of Buckbee is located in the town.

== History ==
The town is named for Charles H. Larrabee, who was a U.S. Representative from Wisconsin at the time the town was formed.

== Geography ==
According to the United States Census Bureau, the town has a total area of 33.6 square miles (87.0 km^{2}), of which 33.4 square miles (86.5 km^{2}) is land and 0.2 square mile (0.6 km^{2}; 0.68%) is water.

== Demographics ==
As of the census of 2000, there were 1,301 people, 473 households, and 384 families residing in the town. The population density was 39.0 people per square mile (15.0/km^{2}). There were 492 housing units at an average density of 14.7 per square mile (5.7/km^{2}). The racial makeup of the town was 99.00% White, 0.08% African American, 0.08% Native American, 0.31% Asian, 0.15% from other races, and 0.38% from two or more races. Hispanic or Latino of any race were 0.54% of the population.

There were 473 households, out of which 35.9% had children under the age of 18 living with them, 70.6% were married couples living together, 4.9% had a female householder with no husband present, and 18.8% were non-families. 15.0% of all households were made up of individuals, and 4.9% had someone living alone who was 65 years of age or older. The average household size was 2.75 and the average family size was 3.04.

In the town, the population was spread out, with 27.5% under the age of 18, 6.4% from 18 to 24, 26.9% from 25 to 44, 27.3% from 45 to 64, and 11.9% who were 65 years of age or older. The median age was 39 years. For every 100 females, there were 105.5 males. For every 100 females age 18 and over, there were 107.3 males.

The median income for a household in the town was $45,119, and the median income for a family was $48,026. Males had a median income of $32,000 versus $21,310 for females. The per capita income for the town was $18,044. About 3.6% of families and 5.9% of the population were below the poverty line, including 6.8% of those under age 18 and 9.7% of those age 65 or over.

== Notable people ==
- George W. Meggers, Wisconsin State Representative and farmer, was born in the town
