= John Rosworm =

John Rosworm or Rosworme (fl. Unknown – 1660) was a Dutch or German soldier and military engineer who served the Parliamentarian cause during the English Civil War. He was Active in Europe and the Civil wars between [1630 – 1660] Date of Birth is Unknown

== Life ==
After serving throughout Europe, Rosworm settled in Manchester in 1642 where the town engaged him on a £ 30, six-month contract to lead their defence against the Royalist Lord Strange. Despite an approach from Strange to defect to the Royalists, Rosworm completed the town's makeshift fortifications on 23 September 1642. The siege began the following day and the town was defended until Strange's withdrawal on 1 October.

Rosworm marshalled a counter-attack against the Royalists, capturing Leigh as a base for Parliamentarian forces in Lancashire. Now made lieutenant colonel in Ralph Ashton's regiment, he organised the fortification of Preston, following its capture on 9 February 1643.

His original contract with Manchester having ended, he was retained on an annual salary of £60, forgoing his commission from Ashton and committing himself to the garrison in Manchester, improving its fortification. During service in the capture of Wigan, Rosworm claimed that Colonel Richard Holland had endangered his safety but Holland escaped censure owing to his strong political influence. A bitter enmity lingered between the two men.

Rosworm was in action in the assault on Warrington and in the fortification of Liverpool before returning to Manchester, then under threat of attack by the William Cavendish, 1st Duke of Newcastle. Rosworm's strategy included defences as far afield as Blackstone Edge and Blackgate in the Pennines above Manchester. Newcastle thought better of his plan.

Rosworm subsequently fought with Sir Thomas Fairfax at Nantwich and Sir John Meldrum at Liverpool as director of the siege to regain the town. Liverpool was won by Parliament on 1 November 1644. The years 1644 and 1645 saw renewed approaches from the Royalist faction, friction with Holland and increasing pay arrears. The Manchester townspeople petitioned parliament to help Rosworm's financial situation but to no avail.

By 1648, Rosworm was in financially straitened circumstances and he visited London to press his cause. Over the next decade he enjoyed sporadic and reluctant reward from the people of Manchester, though he had firmly established his family there. In reply to his repeated petitions of parliament, in 1651, he was rewarded with a post in New Yarmouth to oversee preparations for defence against feared enemy landings. He was subsequently appointed engineer-general for England.

After being appointed engineer-general of the army on 19 July 1659, there is no further record of him. It is thought that he died in exile following the Restoration.
