= Listed buildings in Wardle, Greater Manchester =

Wardle is a village in the Metropolitan Borough of Rochdale, Greater Manchester, England, and it is unparished. The village, together with the nearby settlement of Smallbridge and the surrounding countryside, contains 27 listed buildings that are recorded in the National Heritage List for England. All the listed buildings are designated at Grade II, the lowest of the three grades, which is applied to "buildings of national importance and special interest". The area is largely rural and agricultural, although the textile industry came to the town as a result of the Industrial Revolution. Included in the listed buildings are houses containing multi-light mullioned weavers' windows, and a mill. Most of the listed buildings are houses and associated structures, farmhouses and farm buildings. The other listed buildings include churches, a public house, a bridge and two war memorials.

== Buildings ==
Name and location	Photograph	Date	Notes
Clough House; 53.64902°N 2.14028°W	—	1622	A stone house on a plinth, with quoins and a stone-slate roof. There are two storeys, two bays, a rear outshut, and a right wing. The windows are mullioned with hood moulds. In the right wing is a datestone on a Tudor arched lintel.
Ashbrook Hey; 53.63847°N 2.13232°W	—	1673 (probable)	A stone farmhouse with quoins and a stone-slate roof with coped gables. There are two storeys, two bays, and outbuildings at the rear. The doorway has a chamfered surround and a stone lintel. The windows are mullioned, those on the ground floor having hood moulds.
Vineyard Cottages; 53.65066°N 2.13516°W	—	1703	A stone house with a stone-slate roof, later altered and extended and divided into two dwellings. It has two storeys, two bays, and a later rear range resulting in a double-depth plan. There are quoins in the left part and a porch on the left gable end. The doorway and porch have monolithic jambs and lintels and cornice hoods. The windows are mullioned, and contain 20th-century casements.
The Rochdale Children's Moorland Home; 53.65210°N 2.15968°W	—	1756	Originally a farmhouse and farm buildings, later used for other purposes, it is in stone with a stone-slate roof. The former farmhouse has two storeys and three bays, a projecting porch, and mullioned windows. The former farm buildings to the left have three bays, a cart entry and a porch.
Green Farmhouse, Cottage and farm buildings 53.63481°N 2.12779°W	—	1757	The two houses, barn and farm buildings are in line, they are in stone with quoins, and have a stone-slate roof. The houses have a double-depth plan, two storeys, three bays, and a rear lean-to extension. The windows are mullioned, but some mullions have been lost. The barn to the right has a segmental-arched entry with a keystone, and to the right of that the shippon has two doors with chamfered surrounds and two semicircular openings above. In the gable is an owl hole.
Globe Inn and shop 53.65042°N 2.13420°W		Mid to late 18th century	The public house and attached shop are in stone on a rendered plinth with a stone-slate roof. There are two storeys, a double-depth plan, the pub has two bays and the shop has one. There is an extension to the right and a brick lean-to at the rear. The pub has a doorway with a moulded architrave and a pediment, and the other door has a plain surround. The windows are mullioned, and there is a blocked taking-in door in the gable end.
2 and 4 Lawflat; 53.64487°N 2.13490°W		Late 18th century	A pair of stone houses with a stone-slate roof, three storeys, a double-depth plan, and one bay in each house. The doorways have monolithic jambs and lintels. The windows are mullioned containing casements, those on the top floor have multiple panes replacing workshop windows.
Dob Wheel Mill; 53.63178°N 2.12937°W		Late 18th century	A textile mill to which buildings were added until the late 19th century. The earliest is a stone water mill with a slate roof. In about 1800 a brick three-storey range for hand-loom weaving was built. In 1854 the mill became steam-powered, with an engine house and a boiler house. The main range is in brick, and has two storeys and eleven bays.
Howarth Knowl Farmhouse; 53.64383°N 2.13452°W	—	Late 18th century	A stone farmhouse with quoins and a slate roof. It has a double-depth plan, two storeys, and two bays. In the centre is a single-storey brick porch, and the windows are mullioned, including a twelve-light workshop window on the upper floor.
Lower Eafield Cottages, barn and stables 53.62995°N 2.12592°W	—	Late 18th century	The two cottages were later combined into one house, and the barn and stable were added later at right angles to the right; they are in stone. The house has quoins, a double-depth plan, two storeys and three bays. The two doorways have square-cut lintels and three-piece jambs, and the windows are mullioned. The barn has moulded eaves corbels, and contains doorways, windows, vents with triangular heads, hay doors with pointed voussoirs, and an owl hole. In the stable are a door, two windows, and a square pitching hole.
Stid Fold Farmhouse; 53.65279°N 2.15078°W	—	Late 18th century	A stone farmhouse with quoins and a stone-slate roof. There are two storeys and two bays. On the front is a single-storey porch, and the windows are mullioned, with a former multi-light workshop window on the upper floor.
Stid Fold; house at southeast 53.65243°N 2.15066°W	—	Late 18th century	A stone house with quoins and a stone-slate roof. There are two storeys with an attic, a double-depth plan, and one bay. The doorway has square-cut jambs and lintel, and the windows are mullioned.
Wardle Fold Cottage and barn 53.65112°N 2.13314°W	—	Late 18th century	The house and attached barn are in stone with stone-slate roofs. The house has three storeys, a double-depth plan, and a central doorway with monolithic jambs and lintel. The windows are mullioned, those on the upper two floors are former workshop windows with eight lights. The barn to the left has rear outshuts, and a central cart entrance with long and short jambs and a timber lintel.
2 and 4 Wardle Fold and 224 Ramsden Road; 53.65053°N 2.13426°W	—	c. 1800	Three stone houses with a hipped roof, partly in stone-slate and partly in tiles. There are three storeys, the doorways have monolithic jambs and lintels, and there is a blocked taking-in door. The windows are mullioned, some mullions have been removed, those on the upper floors were originally multi-paned workshop windows.
20 and 22 Knowl Syke Street; 53.65090°N 2.13678°W	—	c. 1800	A pair of stone houses with a roof of 20th-century concrete tiles. They have a double-depth plan, three storeys, and one bay each. The doorways have monolithic jambs and lintels. The windows were mullioned, some mullions have been removed, and on the upper floors they were multi-paned workshop windows.
Stid Fold; house south of Stid Fold Farmhouse; 53.65248°N 2.15157°W	—	Late 18th to early 19th century	A stone house with quoins and a stone-slate roof. It has a double-depth plan, two storeys, two bays, a three-storey extension, a lean-to, and a single-storey rear extension. There is a central doorway with a monolithic surround, and most of the windows are mullioned, with two sash windows in the left gable end.
1 and 2 Pot House Lane; 53.64375°N 2.15308°W	—	1809	A pair of stone cottages with a stone-slate roof. They have a double-depth plan, two storeys, one bay each, and a right lean-to. The doorways have monolithic jambs and lintels, and the windows are mullioned with former workshop windows on the upper floor.
Scout Headquarters; 53.65041°N 2.13498°W	—	1809	Originally a chapel, later used for other purposes, it is in stone on a plinth, with quoins, a band, and a stone-slate roof. There are two storeys, and an entrance front of three bays. The doorway, windows, and an opening in the gable have semicircular heads, impost blocks, and keystones. On the left side is a gabled porch.
Wardle House and Whitaker Mill Farmhouse; 53.65048°N 2.13579°W	—	1815	Originally a mill and a mill owner's house, later two houses. They are in stone with a stone-slate roof, three storeys and ten bays. The doorway has monolithic jambs and lintel, and on the ground floor are mullioned windows with square windows above. In the sixth bay are former loading doors.
Pottery Cottage; 53.64366°N 2.15000°W	—	1825	Originally a Sunday school, later a house, it is in stone with a stone-slate roof. There is one storey and three bays, with timber porches at the front and the rear. The windows have semicircular arches with impost blocks and contain casements.
Bridge over River Roch; 53.63063°N 2.13035°W	—	Early 19th century	The bridge carries Clegg Hall Road over the River Roch. It is in stone and consists of a single arch with lugged voussoirs, a belt, and iron cramped coping to the parapet, which is almost circular in plan, and which has square terminal piers.
Great Howarth House; 53.63677°N 2.13586°W	—	Early 19th century	A stone house with a sill band, a cornice and a parapet. There are two storeys, five bays, a single-storey extension on the right, and a two-storey stone extension at the rear. The central doorway has columns, a fanlight and an open pediment. The windows are sashes, and there are semicircular windows in the gables.
St John the Baptist's Church; 53.63381°N 2.13194°W		1834	A Commissioners' church by Lewis Vulliamy, it is in stone with a slate roof. The church consists of a nave with an entrance at the west flanked by lean-to porches leading to the galleries, and a small chancel with an east vestry. At the west end are octagonal pinnacles, and on the gable is a gabled bellcote with clock faces and a finial. The nave is on a plinth, and along the sides are a continuous hood mould, lancet windows, a parapet, and corner buttresses with gablets. The east window has four lights. Inside the church are galleries, with two tiers at the west end.
St James' Church; 53.64980°N 2.13386°W		1856–58	The church, designed by George Shaw in Early English style, now redundant, is in stone on a plinth, with a sill band, continuous hood moulds, and a slate roof with coped gables. It consists of a nave with a clerestory, north and south aisles, a chancel with a north organ chamber and vestry, and a southwest steeple. The steeple has a four stage tower, angle buttresses, and a broach spire with two tiers of lucarnes.
Methodist Church; 53.65022°N 2.13489°W		1874	The church, in Italianate style, is in stone on a plinth, with bands and a slate roof. There are two storeys and an entrance front of four bays with flanking pilasters. In the centre is a portico with three pairs of Doric columns, an entablature and a parapet. Over this are three round-arched windows with keystones and pilasters, and above them is a gable pediment containing a semicircular window with a carved foliated surround. The outer bays contain windows with semicircular heads, those on the ground floor with entablatures.
Smallbridge war memorial 53.63387°N 2.13202°W	—	c. 1920	The war memorial is in the churchyard of St John the Baptist's Church. It is in sandstone, and consists of a cross on a square plinth on a two-stepped base. On the cross is sculpted foliate decoration and a monogram. On the plinth are an inscription and the names of those lost in both World Wars, and on the base is another inscription. The memorial is surrounded by a low bronze railing.
Wardle war memorial 53.63848°N 2.13529°W		Early 1920s	The war memorial stands in a memorial garden, and is in granite and marble. It consists of a square three-stepped plinth, a pedestal in polished granite, a Doric column in grey marble, and a stylised Celtic cross in granite. There are inscriptions on the pedestal, and plaques containing the names of those lost in both World Wars.
