= George W. Meggers =

American farmer and politician

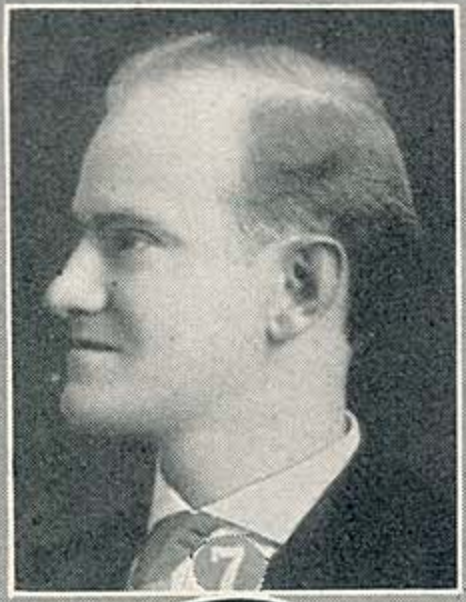
George W. Meggers of Clintonville, Wisconsin

George W. Meggers (May 15, 1888 – March 21, 1969) was an American farmer and politician from Clintonville, Wisconsin.

== Background ==
Born in the town of Larrabee, Waupaca County, Wisconsin, Meggers was educated in the Clintonville public schools and became a dairy farmer. He married Barbara Schernick on March 22, 1914, in Milwaukee.

== Public office ==
Meggers first entered politics when elected in 1910 to serve on the Waupaca County board of supervisors. He was also elected to Clintonville's common council. He was elected in the Wisconsin State Assembly from Waupaca County in 1922 as an independent La Follette Progressive, with 3,667 votes to 3,125 for regular Republican Lila Matteson. (Republican incumbent Fred Hess was not a candidate.) Meggers was assigned to the standing committee on agriculture. He was re-elected in 1924 as a Republican, with 5,619 votes to 2,836 for independent George Millard (or Millerd) and 531 for Socialist R. I. Anderson. He remained on the agriculture committee, and was also assigned to the committees on excise and fees (of which he was chairman) and on rules. He was not a candidate for re-election, and was succeeded by Republican Adam Schider.

== After the Assembly ==
After leaving the Assembly, he was briefly employed as an agent of the state treasury by governor John J. Blaine but was fired when Fred R. Zimmerman became governor. In 1927 he bought and rebuilt a lakeside resort which he would operate until 1946. In 1931, he started Meggers Dairy, which he would hand over to his daughter in 1948. Throughout this period, he continued to manage his farm and its herd of purebred dairy cattle. He also spent 13 years on the board of directors of the Clintonville Federal Savings and Loan. Meggers was elected as mayor of Clintonville in 1954. His wife Barbara died February 6, 1969, and Meggers died on March 21, 1969, in Clintonville due to an illness he had begun fighting in December 1955.
