= Hundersfield =

Former township in Lancashire, England

Hundersfield (/ˈhɒnərzfiːld/ HON-ərz-feeld; also more anciently known as Honersfield and Honnersfield) was a manor, parish and, from 1746, township, within the parish of Rochdale, in the hundred of Salford, England. It straddled the historic county boundary between Lancashire and the West Riding of Yorkshire. There are written references to the parish dating back to 1202.

Hundersfield lay on high moorland around Blackstone Edge, containing the settlements of Todmorden, Walsden, Littleborough, Wardle, Smallbridge and parts of Rochdale. The name Hundersfield is a corruption of Honorsfield; and that was derived from the word "Honore", signifying a Saxon lord. Hundersfield was originally one of four townships within Rochdale, but was itself split into four. Hundersfield was divided into four townships or civil parishes which were all originally within the ancient ecclesiastical parish of Rochdale. The divisions were Blatchinworth and Calderbrook, Wardleworth, and Wuerdle and Wardle in Lancashire and Todmorden and Walsden which became part of the West Riding of Yorkshire in 1889. After 1894 Hundersfield was divided between the Wardle and Littleborough Urban Districts and Rochdale Borough.
