= Entwisle =

Entwisle is a surname. Notable people with the surname include:

- Gertrude Lilian Entwisle (1892–1961), British electrical engineer;
- Edmund Entwisle (1660–1707), English clergyman;
- Joseph Entwisle (1767–1841), English Methodist minister;
- Peter Entwisle (1948–2018), New Zealand art historian;
- Richard William Entwisle (born 1986), namesake of the minor planet 21522 Entwisle;
- Timothy John Entwisle (born 1965), Australian botanist;
- William Entwisle (1808–1865), British politician.

== See also ==
- Bertine Entwisle Sutton (1886–1946), British pilot and Air Marshall
- Entwistle (disambiguation)
- Entwistle (surname)
