= Buckley Hall =

Coordinates: 53°38′6.9″N 2°8′40.1″W

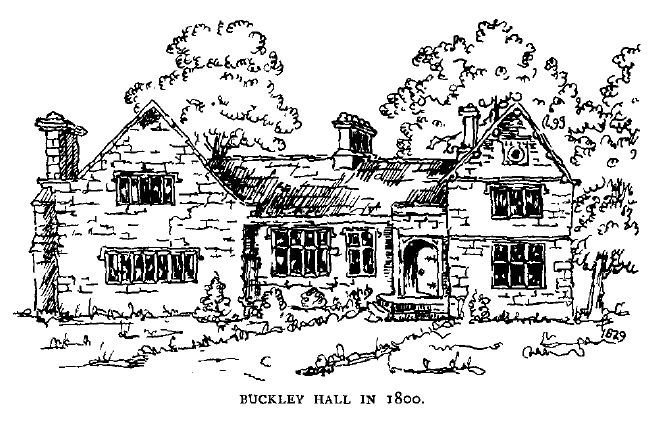
Buckley Hall in 1800

Buckley Hall was a historic house in Buckley near Rochdale, Lancashire, England which was the family seat of the Buckley family and later home of the Entwistle family. The building was a Catholic boys' orphanage from 1888 to 1947, when it was demolished; Buckley Hall Prison now occupies the site.

== History ==
The surname Buckley in its various spellings was first recorded in the 12th century and was supposed to have descended from a supporter of William the Conqueror. The original Hall was in existence before 1626 and was demolished in 1860, and rebuilt to "the highest standards of opulence and comfort" by William Whitworth Schofield, a local mill owner.

=== Orphanage ===
After the death of the owner, William Schofield, in 1882, the Hall remained unoccupied for five years. Herbert Vaughan, the Bishop of Salford, enlisted the help of the Congregation of the Brothers of Charity, an organisation already active in the welfare and education of children in Belgium and France, to initiate a similar service in the Roman Catholic Diocese of Salford. They agreed to do and eventually purchased the Hall as an orphanage in 1887. Following a year spent making alterations and adaptations to render the building fit for its intended use, the orphanage was officially opened in 1888 with 28 boys. Six months later, the number increased to 80 and the original building was extended. Subsequent increases required further building with extensions on a much larger scale to provide accommodation for a total of 300. This also involved the provision of premises for the industrial training of the boys, completed in 1905.

The trades taught included plumbing, printing, bookbinding, joinery and woodcarving and boot and shoe repairs. The latter department also developed a manufacturing section which produced boots and shoes for the boys and members of the staff. Master craftsmen were employed in each of these disciplines in order to ensure that the boys received expert tuition.

Extramural activities included the formation of a band and choir, both of which performed outside the orphanage, and the organisation of football and cricket teams.

Thousands of Catholic boys lived there and many of them grew up, found jobs, got married and settled in Rochdale. Some, however, took ill and did not survive. They were buried in adjoining plots in the cemetery, along with some of Buckley Hall's teachers and servants. The last boy to die there was buried in 1941.

=== Prison ===
Although the orphanage ceased to exist in 1947? the buildings including Buckley Hall. Buckley Farm and Ball Barn Farm were later acquired by the Prison Service and operated as a senior detention centre for young men aged 18 to 21. Additional workshops and farm buildings were added in this period. The Hall and associated buildings remained intact until the site of the Hall and orphanage was redeveloped as a senior prison in the late 1980s /early 1990s.

Member of staff 1968 -1979
