= Buckbee =

Buckbee is a surname. Notable people with the surname include:

- Bill Buckbee, American politician
- John T. Buckbee (1871–1936), American politician

== See also ==
- Buckbee, Wisconsin
- Buckby (surname)
