= Entwistle =

Entwistle may refer to:

== People ==
- Entwistle (surname)
- John Entwistle (1944–2002), English singer, songwriter, musician, composer and record producer; bassist of the Who
- Peg Entwistle (1908–1932), British stage and film actress
- Entwisle, a related surname

== Places ==
- Entwistle, Alberta, a hamlet in Alberta, Canada, within Parkland County
- Entwistle, Lancashire, a village in North Turton, England
  - Entwistle railway station

== See also ==
- Entwhistle Books, American small book publisher
- Entwisle, a minor planet discovered in 1998
