= HM Prison Buckley Hall =

Prison in Rochdale, England

Buckley Hall Prison
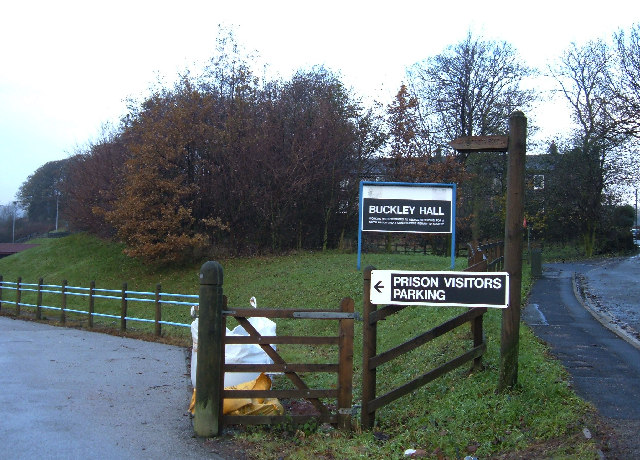
- Buckley Hall Prison entrance

- Location in Greater Manchester
- Location: Rochdale, Greater Manchester; 53°38′06″N 2°08′42″W
- Security class: Adult Male/Category C
- Capacity: 445
- Population: ~450 (21 April 2020)
- Former name: HM Prison Buckley Hall
- Managed by: HM Prison Service
- Governor: David McGurrell
- Website: Buckley Hall at justice.gov.uk

Buckley Hall Prison is a Category C male prison in the Buckley district of Rochdale in North West England. It is operated by His Majesty's Prison and Probation Service.

== History ==
Buckley Hall takes its name from Buckley Hall, a historic house which previously occupied the site. After the Second World War, the old mansion was demolished and Buckley Hall Young Offenders Institution built in its place. The site acted as a prison for young males until 1989 and after that as a venue for Prison Service Control and Restraint training.

In 1994, the majority of the old prison was demolished and a new Category C prison for adult males constructed in its place. The new Buckley Hall prison was initially operated by Group 4 Prison Services, the fourth private prison to be run in the UK. However, after a tendering process in 2000 the establishment reverted to H.M. Prison Service control.

In 2001, the Prison Service announced that Buckley Hall would be converted to take female inmates after increased demand for women's places in prison. The first female prisoners arrived in 2002. In 2004, the prison was criticised for not being adequately prepared after it was converted from a men's prison.

In 2005, as a result of population pressures in prisons for men, it was announced that Buckley Hall would be converted back to a Category C male prison. Male prisoners began arriving at Buckley Hall on 5 December 2005.

Since its conversion back to a Male Category C establishment, the prison has met the Prison Service's Key Performance Targets (KPTs). The establishment offers prisoners various programs prior to their release.

== The prison today ==
Buckley Hall Prison houses sentenced male Category C prisoners, primarily from the Manchester area. Buckley hall is now a long term cat C, housing inmates with sentences of four years or over. All prisoners with under 6 months left to serve are transferred back to local prisons for local release.

Accommodation at the prison is split into four units, with an additional Care and Separation Unit for vulnerable prisoners. Due to the residential units at Buckley Hall being on a 1:15 incline, the prison is unable to accept prisoners with mobility or heart problems. All cells have full integral sanitation and in-cell TV.

Education and training at the prison is contracted out to Novus. Courses and workshops include adult basic education, open learning, information technology, art and design, key skills, life and social skills and construction. The prison also has a library.

Other facilities at Buckley Hall include tables for pool, table football and table tennis, as well as board games and a video library. There is also a gym and sports pitches, as well as a full-time prison chaplaincy. There is also a health centre for prisoners on site.

The capacity of the establishment increased in 2011 with the introduction of a new accommodation unit built in the grounds housing an additional 60 men and increasing capacity to 445.
