= Wardle Academy =

Coordinates: 53.6421°N 2.1278°W

Location
- Birch Road; Wardle, Rochdale, Greater Manchester, OL12 9RD; United Kingdom

Information
- Type: Academy
- Motto: The Wardle Way
- Established: c. 1877
- Trust: Watergrove Trust
- Department for Education URN: 140055 Tables
- Ofsted: Reports
- Headteacher: James Glennie
- Gender: Mixed
- Age: 11 to 16
- Enrolment: 1247
- Former name: Wardle High School
- Website: https://www.wardleacademy.co.uk/

Wardle Academy is a coeducational secondary school with academy status, located in Wardle, Greater Manchester, England. It was founded in September 1877..

== History ==
Since its inauguration, the school has gained a good reputation within the local communities of Littleborough, Rochdale and Wardle in which its students reside. Despite problems with previous management in 2004, it has now made progress in the rebuilding of the infrastructure and education, however was judged to be good in the most recent OFSTED report. It currently has 1200+ students on roll.

The school achieved Performing Arts status in 2003 which generated the standard additional financial resources due to schools with "specialist" status. The school applied for and achieved Artsmark Gold Award, it has maintained its Artsmark and is about to apply for Artsmark Gold again in the next round of applications. The school is notable for its musical provision both in house and in local Primary Schools, which has been noted in Ofsted reports. The school currently has four brass bands of different age groups, which have played at major venues such as the South Bank, Royal Festival Hall and Birmingham Symphony Hall, as well as boasting performances at the Royal Albert Hall and several Televisual credits including an appearance in 'Brassed Off' and one on Blue Peter. In April 2007 the School Youth Band won the title of National School's Champions of Great Britain and again more recently in 2011. The Youth Band have also won the European Youth Championships' Development Section in 2015, 2018, 2019 and 2022. The band has also recently won Youth Brass in Contest in 2024 and 2025 and the National Youth Brass Band Championships (Championship section) in 2024.

The school converted to academy status on 1 September 2013 and formed The Watergrove Trust when Matthew Moss High School joined in 2019.

== Sources ==
1. Ofsted Report on Wardle High School.
2. Rochdale Observer - School passes the OFSTED test
3. 4barsrest.com - Wardle delight at National Title
1. Manchester Evening News - Brass with a touch of class
