= County Borough of Rochdale =

Coordinates: 53°37′N 2°10′W

Rochdale
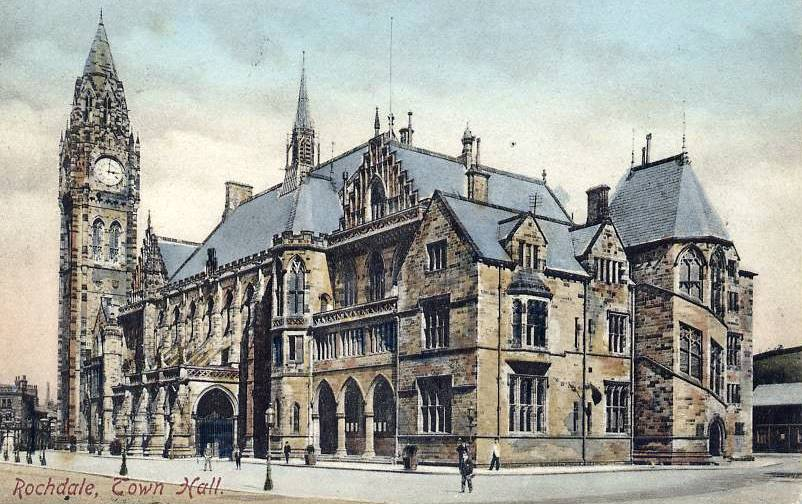
- Rochdale Town Hall
- Area
  - 1911: 6,446 acres (26.09 km^{2})
  - 1961: 9,556 acres (38.67 km^{2})
- Population
  - 1901: 83,114
  - 1971: 91,428
- History
  - Created: 1856
  - Abolished: 1974
  - Succeeded by: Metropolitan Borough of Rochdale
- Status: Municipal borough 1856–1889; County borough 1889–1974
- Government
  - HQ: Rochdale Town Hall
  - Motto: Crede Signo (Believe in this sign)

Rochdale was, from 1856 to 1974, a local government district coterminate with the town of Rochdale in the northwest of England.

== Municipal borough ==
Rochdale Improvement Act 1825
- Act of Parliament
- Parliament of the United Kingdom
- Long title: An Act for lighting, cleansing, watching and regulating the Town of Rochdale, in the County Palatine of Lancaster.
- Citation: 6 Geo. 4. c. cxxviii

Dates
- Royal assent: 10 June 1825

Other legislation
- Repealed by: Rochdale Improvement Act 1844

Status: Repealed

Text of statute as originally enacted

In January 1856 the inhabitant householders of the Parliamentary Borough of Rochdale, Lancashire, petitioned the Privy Council for the grant of a charter of incorporation under the Municipal Corporations Act 1835 constituting the town as a municipal borough. The petition was successful and the charter was granted in September 1856. In 1858 the borough corporation took over the powers of the Rochdale Improvement Commissioners, which had been established by a local act of parliament, the Rochdale Improvement Act 1825 (6 Geo. 4. c. cxxviii) in 1825 to watch, light and cleanse the town. The borough was extended in 1872.

== County borough ==
The Local Government Act 1888 constituted all municipal boroughs with a population of more than 50,000 as "county borough"s. Accordingly, the County Borough of Rochdale came into existence in 1889, with the powers of both a borough and a county council. Rochdale remained within Lancashire for certain purposes such as lieutenancy and administration of justice.

In 1900 the county borough absorbed the bulk of the neighbouring Castleton Urban District by mutual agreement. The borough boundaries were extended again in 1933 by a county review order.

The county borough was abolished in 1974 by the Local Government Act 1972. Its area formed part of the Metropolitan Borough of Rochdale in the new county of Greater Manchester.

== Borough council ==
Under the charter of 1856 the borough was governed by a town council consisting of a mayor, ten aldermen and thirty councillors. The borough was divided into three wards: Castleton and Wardleworth represented by twelve councillors and four aldermen each, and Spotland with six councillors and two aldermen. One third of the councillors in each ward were elected annually by the burgesses or local government electors. The aldermen were elected to a six-year term by the council itself, with half the aldermanic bench retiring every three years. The mayor was elected annually by the council from among their membership.

When the borough was extended in 1872, the council seats were redistributed and the borough was divided into ten wards, each with three councillors and one alderman, with the size of the council remaining at forty. When Castleton Urban District was absorbed in 1900, an eleventh ward of Castleton Moor was added, and the council increased to thirty-three councillors and eleven alderman. In 1933 the bulk of Norden Urban District was added to the borough as a twelfth ward, and the council consisted of thirty-six councillors and twelve aldermen until its abolition in 1974.

=== Politics ===
For the first seven decades of the borough's existence it was dominated by the Liberal Party, who maintained a large majority. Conservatives formed an opposition grouping, and Socialist and Independent Labour Party councillors appeared from the end of the nineteenth century. From the nineteen thirties the Liberal hegemony began to be challenged, with an increase in the number of Labour and Conservative members, and there was no one grouping in control. By the nineteen sixties control alternated between Liberals/Conservative and Labour administrations.

==== Election results 1933–1972 ====
The following list shows the numbers of councillors and aldermen of each party following the annual borough elections. There were no elections from 1939 to 1944 due to the Second World War. Elections due in November 1948 were postponed until May 1949, with municipal elections held in that month from then on. The final elections to the county borough council were held in 1972, with members holding office until abolition two years later.

Election	Liberal Party	Conservative Party	Labour Party	Independents	Control
1933	24 (-1)	16 (-1)	6 (+2)	1	Liberal hold
1934	23	17 (-1)	7 (+1)	1	No overall control
1935	24	17	7	0	Liberal hold
1936	25 (+2)	15 (-1)	7 (-1)	1	Liberal gain form no overall control
1937	24 (-1)	17 (+2)	6 (-1)	1	Liberal hold
1938	23 (-1)	18	6	1 (+1)	Liberal lose to no overall control
1945	23 (-1)	16 (-2)	10 (+3)	1	No overall control
1946	21 (-1)	17	9 (+1)	1	No overall control
1947	25 (+4)	14 (-3)	8 (-1)	1	Liberal gain from no overall control
1949	27 (+1)	14 (+1)	6 (-2)	1	Liberal hold
1950	23 (-2)	17 (+2)	7	1	Liberal lose to no overall control
1951	22 (-1)	16 (-1)	9 (+2)	1	No overall control
1952	18 (-3)	12 (-4)	17 (+7)	1	No overall control
1953	16 (-1)	12 (-1)	19 (+2)	1	No overall control
1954	14 (-2)	12 (-1)	22 (+3)	0 (-1)	No overall control
1955	16 (+2)	13 (+3)	17 (-5)	0	No overall control
1956	16	13 (-1)	19 (+1)	0	No overall control
1957	16	12	20	0	No overall control
1958	15 (-1)	11 (-1)	22 (+2)	0	No overall control
1959	16 (+2)	12 (+1)	20 (-3)	0	No overall control
1960	17	11 (-1)	20 (+1)	0	No overall control
1961	17 (+1)	11	19 (-1)	1	No overall control
1962	15 (-2)	8 (-3)	23 (+4)	2 (+1)	Liberal with Conservative support
1963	14 (-1)	7 (-1)	26 (+3)	1 (-1)	Labour gain from Liberal - Conservative
1964	12 (-1)	5 (-2)	30 (+3)	1	Labour hold
1965	13 (+1)	10 (+5)	25 (-5)	0 (-1)	Labour hold
1966	13	11	24	0	Labour lose to no overall control
1967	14 (+1)	14 (+3)	15 (-4)	5	No overall control
1968	19 (+1)	18 (+3)	11 (-3)	0 (-1)	No overall control
1969	20 (+1)	21 (+3)	7 (-4)	0	No overall control
1970	15 (-2)	19 (-4)	12 (+6)	1	No overall control (1 vacancy)
1971	11 (-2)	14 (-5)	22 (+7)	1	No overall control
1972	9 (-4)	11 (-1)	28 (+6)	0 (-1)	Labour gain from no overall control

== Coat of arms ==
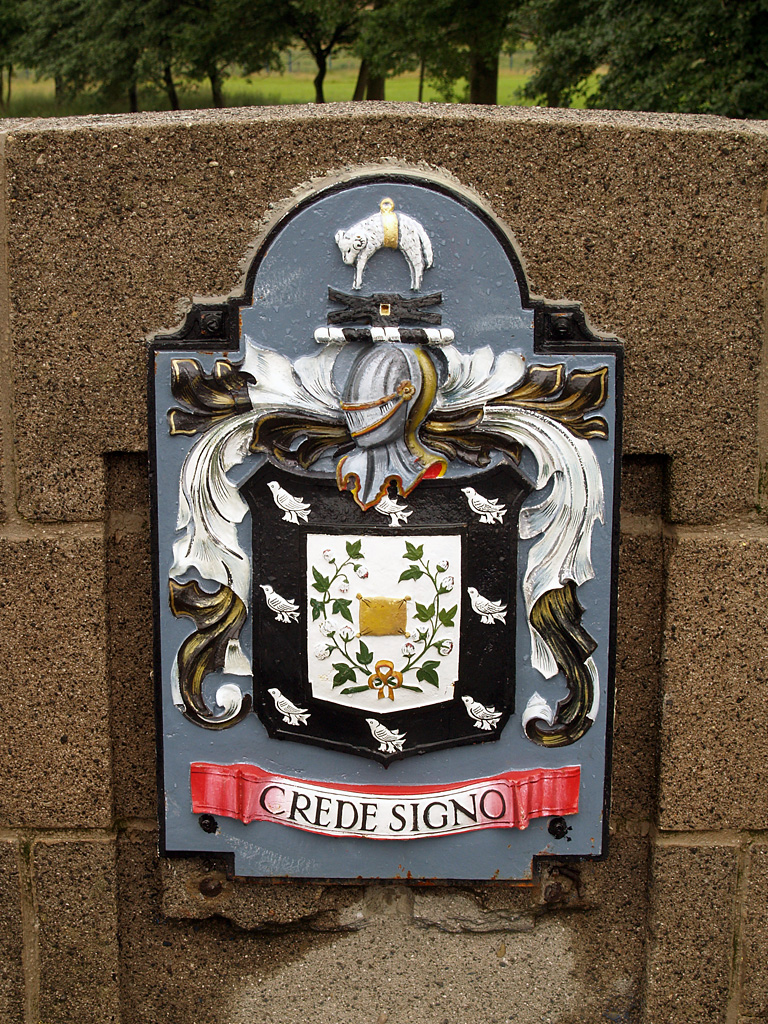
The coat of arms of the former Rochdale County Borough Council.

The Mayor, Aldermen and Burgesses of Rochdale were granted armorial bearings by letters patent dated 20 February 1857 sealed by Sir Charles George Young, Garter Principal King of Arms; James Pulman, Clarenceux King of Arms; and Robert Laurie, Norroy King of Arms.

The blazon was as follows:

Argent a wool-pack encircled by two branches of the cotton-tree flowered and conjoined proper, a bordure sable, charged with eight martlets of the field. And for the Crest: Upon a wreath of the colours, a mill-rind sable, and above a fleece argent banded or.

The emblems in the centre of the shield represented the industries of the borough: a fleece for the woollen industry; the cotton branches for the cotton industry; and the millrind for the iron industry. The black border bore six martlets or heraldic swallows. The martlets and black and silver colouring were derived from the arms of the Rashdale and Dearden families. James Dearden purchased the manor of Rochdale from Lord Byron in 1823.

The crest, placed on a helm above the shield, represented the wool and iron industries with a fleece and millrind.

The Latin motto adopted was Crede Signo or "Trust in this sign". It was based on that of Baron Byron of Rochdale: Crede Byron.

The coat of arms continue to appear on the crest of Rochdale A.F.C., the town's football club.

== Utilities ==
Rochdale, in common with many British municipalities, took over the ownership and provision of a number of utility services.

=== Gas supply ===
Rochdale Gas Act 1823
- Act of Parliament
- Parliament of the United Kingdom
- Long title: An Act for lighting with Gas the Town of Rochdale, and the Neighbourhood thereof, within the Parish of Rochdale in the County Palatine of Lancaster.
- Citation: 4 Geo. 4. c. xxxvi

Dates
- Royal assent: 23 May 1823

Other legislation
- Repealed by: Rochdale Gas Act 1844

Status: Repealed

Text of statute as originally enacted

Rochdale Gas Act 1844
- Act of Parliament
- Parliament of the United Kingdom
- Long title: An Act for more effectually lighting with Gas the Borough and Parish of Rochdale in the County of Lancaster.
- Citation: 7 & 8 Vict. c. cii

Dates
- Royal assent: 10 May 1844

The Rochdale Gas Light and Coke Company was incorporated by the Rochdale Gas Act 1823 (4 Geo. 4. c. xxxvi). In 1824 it opened a gasworks at what would later be Dane Street. Following a dispute with the Rochdale Police Commissioners over the price of providing public street lighting, the commissioners promoted the Rochdale Gas Act 1844 (7 & 8 Vict. c. cii) and acquired the undertaking, which in 1858 they passed to the borough. In 1871 the corporation began rebuilding and enlarging the gasworks. In the 1930s the Whitworth Vale and Milnrow gas companies were acquired. By 1948 the undertaking supplied the County Borough of Rochdale and the urban districts of Milnrow, Wardle and Whitworth. The corporation lost control of the undertaking to the North Western Gas Board when gas supply was nationalised by the Gas Act 1948.

=== Water supply ===
Rochdale Water Act 1809
- Act of Parliament
- Parliament of the United Kingdom
- Long title: An Act for better supplying the Inhabitants of the Town of Rochdale and the Neighbourhood thereof with Water.
- Citation: 49 Geo. 3. c. xxv

Dates
- Royal assent: 28 April 1809

Other legislation
- Repealed by: Rochdale Water Act 1839

Status: Repealed

Text of statute as originally enacted

A supply of drinking water was introduced to the town by a private company, the Company of Proprietors of the Rochdale Waterworks, or Rochdale Waterworks Company, incorporated by the Rochdale Water Act 1809 (49 Geo. 3. c. xxv).

Rochdale Corporation Water Act 1898
- Act of Parliament
- Parliament of the United Kingdom
- Long title: An Act to authorise the Mayor Aldermen and Burgesses of the County Borough of Rochdale to acquire the undertaking of the Todmorden Waterworks Company to construct additional waterworks and for other purposes.
- Citation: 61 & 62 Vict. c. ccxxxvi

Dates
- Royal assent: 12 August 1898

Text of statute as originally enacted

In 1866 the borough corporation took control. The original reservoir at Leyland Brow proved insufficient for the town, and under the Rochdale Corporation Water Act 1898 (61 & 62 Vict. c. ccxxxvi) the Todmorden Waterworks Company was acquired, and the corporation was given power to construct Ramsden Clough Reservoir. As the town grew it was clear that a larger supply would be needed, and by the Oldham and Rochdale Corporations Water Act 1923 (13 & 14 Geo. 5. c. lxxvii) Rochdale Corporation and the County Borough of Oldham jointly acquired the reservoirs of the Rochdale Canal Company, such as Blackstone Edge Reservoir. Watergrove Reservoir, near Wardle was constructed in 1938.

In 1967 the Rochdale Corporation water undertaking was merged with those of Ashton-under-Lyne, Dukinfield, Heywood, Middleton, Oldham, Saddleworth and Stalybridge to form the West Pennine Water Board. The water board was in turn merged into the North West Water Authority by the Water Act 1973.

=== Electricity ===
In 1896 the borough council resolved to establish a municipal electricity supply to the town, and in particular to power the tramway system. The Rochdale Electric Lighting Order 1898 was granted, and the Rochdale power station was constructed near the gasworks. Power began to flow in October 1900. As electricity began to be adopted for industrial purposes it was necessary to construct larger generating facilities in 1919. An interconnection agreement was also established with the Lancashire Electric Power Company. By the 1930s the corporation electricity department also supplied the neighbouring urban districts of Littleborough, Milnrow, Norden, Wardle and Whitworth.

By 1930 domestic demand for electricity was well established, and the electricity department opened an appliance showroom: "Electric House", in Smith Street.

On 1 April 1948 the Electricity Act 1947 came into effect, and the undertaking was nationalised, becoming part of the North Western Electricity Board.

== Rochdale Corporation Transport ==
The Board of Trade made an the Rochdale Tramways Order 1881 under the Tramways Act 1870 (33 & 34 Vict. c. 78), giving Rochdale Corporation powers to construct a street tramway. The line was opened on 7 May 1883 and was operated by the steam trams of the Manchester, Bury, Rochdale and Oldham Steam Tramways Company Limited. The company went into liquidation in 1887, but in the following year the service was restored under the auspices of the Bury, Rochdale and Oldham Steam Tramways Company Limited.

Rochdale Corporation Act 1900
- Act of Parliament
- Parliament of the United Kingdom
- Long title: An Act to enable the Mayor Aldermen and Burgesses of the Borough of Rochdale to reconstruct the existing tramways in the said borough when acquired by them and to construct additional tramways in and adjacent to the borough and to make further provisions for the good government of the borough and for other purposes.
- Citation: 63 & 64 Vict. c. cclxxviii

Dates
- Royal assent: 6 August 1900

The corporation obtained powers in the Rochdale Corporation Act 1900 (63 & 64 Vict. c. cclxxviii) to operate the trams itself, and the borough council purchased and electrified the tram network, with the first Rochdale Corporation tram running on 22 May 1902. The last steam tram route was replaced in 1905. In 1911 Rochdale made agreements with two neighbouring municipalities, the borough of Bacup and Milnrow Urban District, to operate the tram networks they had constructed. In addition the corporation tracks reached as far as Littleborough and Whitworth, and ran joint operations with other municipal operators. In 1925 the county borough purchased the Middleton Electric Tramways Company jointly with the Municipal Borough of Middleton and Chadderton Urban District Council. The purchase allowed through running of Rochdale trams into Manchester city centre.

The corporation began operating motorbus services in 1926, initially in addition to the tram network. 1930 saw the first replacement of trams with buses, and the last tram service ran on 12 November 1932. The borough's bus services expanded as new estates were built on the edge of the town.

On 1 November 1969 the corporation ceased to operate buses, with its transport department merged with those of a number of other municipalities to form the new SELNEC Passenger Transport Executive. Rochdale contributed 130 vehicles to the new undertaking's fleet of 2,526.
