= Blackstone Edge =

Gritstone escarpment in the Pennine Hills, England

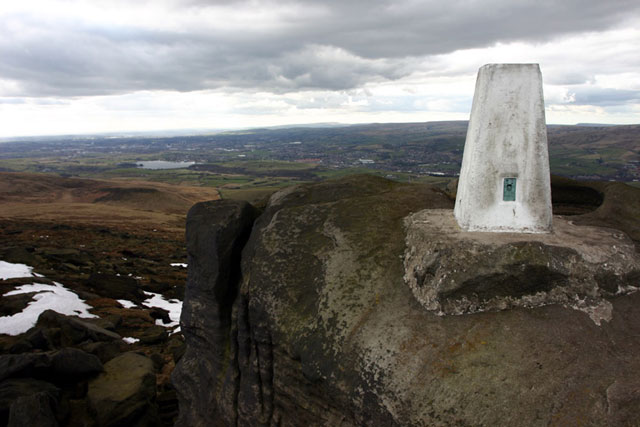
- The highest point of Blackstone Edge

Highest point
- Elevation: 1,549 ft (472 m)
- Coordinates: 53°38′24″N 2°02′35″W

Geography
- Location within Greater Manchester
- Location: Littleborough, Greater Manchester, England
- Parent range: Pennines
- OS grid: SD977163

Blackstone Edge (/ˈblækstən/ BLAK-stən) is a gritstone escarpment at 472 metres (1,549 ft) above sea level in the Pennine hills surrounded by moorland on the boundary between Greater Manchester and West Yorkshire in England.

== History ==
Blackstone Edge contains evidence of prehistoric activity with the presence of three cup marks on an outcrop of rock 150 metres (490 ft) north west of the (later) Aiggin stone identified by Archaeological Services WYAS.

Crossing the escarpment is Blackstone Edge Long Causeway, also known as Blackstone Edge Roman Road, a partially paved road on the Greater Manchester side, becoming a holloway through peat as it runs into Yorkshire. The Blackstone Edge Long Causeway was originally thought to be of Roman origin until investigations by James Maxim, who proposed the theory that it was actually a 1735 turnpike or packhorse route. This theory was widely accepted until 2012 when investigations by Archaeological Services WYAS led them to conclude that "The archaeological surface evidence...suggests that the route of the road is unlikely to have originated as part of a turnpike scheme as probable medieval and post-medieval features, including a packhorse road, appear to overlie the substantial road cuttings in a number of places. If the road does not originate in the 18th century, then the scale of construction of the road cuttings suggest a level of engineering skill, planning and use of resources only otherwise normally associated with Roman roads." This report confirms the original Roman date. The route is designated as a scheduled monument in both Greater Manchester and West Yorkshire.

The Aiggin Stone, a gritstone pillar, possibly a way-marker, stands alongside the road, which may also have seen later use as a packhorse route, and marks the county boundary. The stone has a cross and the letters I and T cut into it. Its name is said to derive from the French aiguille for a needle or aigle for an eagle.

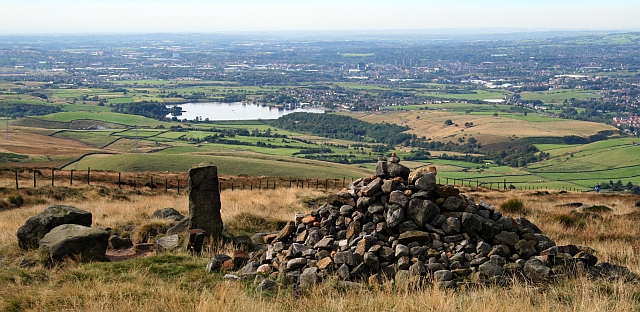
The Aiggin Stone and cairn on Blackstone Edge Moor

Much of the surrounding area was within the ancient parish of Hundersfield, although some parts lay within Butterworth township. During the English Civil War, the Parliamentarians sent 800 men to fortify Blackstone Edge; John Rosworm came from Manchester to direct the construction of defences. It was successfully held against an attack by Royalist cavalry. In 1660 the churchwardens of St Chad's paid 24 shillings for eight loads of "great stones from Blackstoneedge" for Rochdale church steps. Celia Fiennes travelled over Blackstone Edge and described her journey in about 1700. A meeting of supporters of Chartism from the surrounding industrial towns of Lancashire and Yorkshire was held in 1846, attracting up to 30,000 people.

== Sport ==
Blackstone Edge is frequented by walkers and rock climbers who use its traditional climbing and bouldering routes. The crag was featured in Some Gritstone Climbs, a pioneering 1913 guide to rock-climbing in the Peak District, by John Laycock. One walking route is a circular walk from Hollingworth Lake in Smithy Bridge near Littleborough up to Blackstone Edge, and another route links Blackstone Edge to Hebden Bridge in the Calder Valley. The Pennine Way long-distance footpath from Edale in the Derbyshire Peak District to Kirk Yetholm in Scotland passes along the top of the outcrop. It is also an alternative route of the Rochdale Way.

From the summit one can see Manchester city centre, Winter Hill in the West Pennine Moors, and the mountains in North Wales in clear weather.

Halifax Road, which goes up towards Blackstone Edge reservoir, provides a popular cycling ascent. With 240 m (790 ft) of ascent from the centre of Littleborough, at an average gradient of 5%, it is recognised as a category 3 climb on Strava.
