= Globe Inn, Wardle =

Listed pub in Greater Manchester, England

Globe Inn
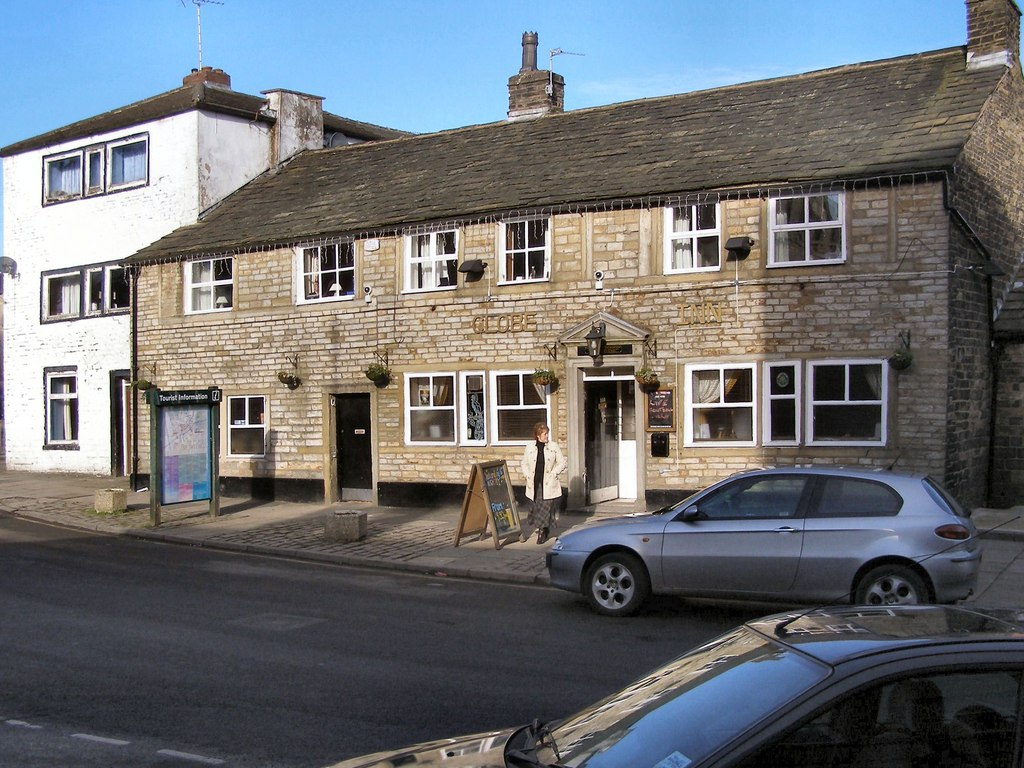
- The building in 2010

- Location within Greater Manchester

General information
- Type: Public house
- Location: 218 Ramsden Road, Wardle, Greater Manchester, England
- Coordinates: 53.6504°N 2.1342°W
- Year built: Mid to late 18th century
- Owner: Admiral Taverns

Design and construction
- Designations

Listed Building – Grade II
- Official name: Butcher's shop Globe Inn
- Designated: 29 June 1966
- Reference no.: 1084236

The Globe Inn is a Grade II listed public house on Ramsden Road in Wardle, a village within the Metropolitan Borough of Rochdale, Greater Manchester, England. Built in the mid to late 18th century, it was voted the Rochdale Observer readers' favourite pub in 2010. By 2011 it was in the ownership of Enterprise Inns, and it is now operated by Admiral Taverns.

== History ==
The building was constructed in the mid to late 18th century, according to its official listing. The 1893 and 1930 Ordnance Survey maps record the building as an inn, without an attributed name, and by the 1940 edition it is marked as a public house. On 29 June 1966, the Globe Inn and the adjoining shop, then operating as a butcher's, was designated a Grade II listed building.

By 2011 the pub was owned by Enterprise Inns and had been voted the Rochdale Observer readers' favourite pub the previous year. It underwent a temporary closure in 2013, with rising beer prices and increased rent cited locally as contributing factors. As of 2025, the Globe Inn is owned by Admiral Taverns.

== Architecture ==
The building is constructed in stone with a stone‑slate roof and each property has two floors. The former butcher's shop at No. 220 is a single room in width and two rooms deep, while the pub at No. 218 is wider, with two rooms across the front and two rooms in depth, entered through a central doorway. An 18th‑century addition stands to the right, and there is a small brick lean-to at the back. The base is rendered, and the windows have simple stone surrounds; the long first‑floor window once had 19 panes, though several have since been filled in and some of the stone divisions removed.

On either side of the door to No. 220 is a five‑pane window with missing divisions, and the opening to the pub no longer retains its original stonework. The doorway to No. 220 has a decorative frame, while that to the pub is plain. A former loading opening is blocked in the left gable, and the rear of No. 220 includes a four‑pane and a six‑pane window, both altered from their original form.

== See also ==
- Listed buildings in Wardle, Greater Manchester
- Listed pubs in Greater Manchester
