= USS Dennis J. Buckley (DD-808) =

Gearing-class destroyer

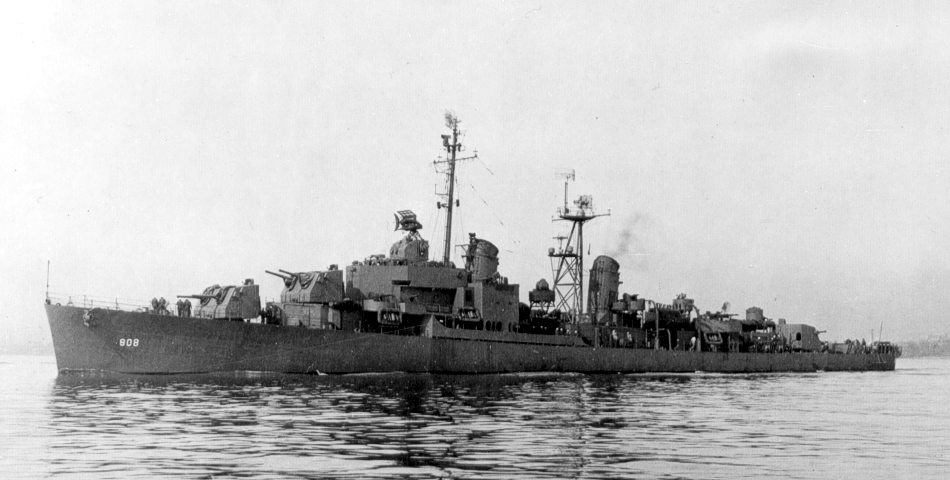

History

United States
- Name: USS Dennis J. Buckley
- Namesake: Fireman Dennis J. Buckley, Jr. (1920-1943), a U.S. Navy sailor and Silver Star recipient
- Builder: Bath Iron Works, Bath, Maine
- Laid down: 24 July 1944
- Launched: 20 December 1944
- Commissioned: 2 March 1945
- Modernized: 4 November 1964 (FRAM IB)
- Decommissioned: 2 July 1973
- Reclassified: DDR-808, 18 March 1949
- Stricken: 2 July 1973
- Identification: Callsign: NDJB; Hull number: DD-808
- Motto: Experto credite
- Fate: Sold for scrap, 29 April 1974

General characteristics
- Class & type: Gearing-class destroyer
- Displacement: 3,460 long tons (3,516 t) full
- Length: 390 ft 6 in (119.02 m)
- Beam: 40 ft 10 in (12.45 m)
- Draft: 14 ft 4 in (4.37 m)
- Propulsion: Geared turbines, 2 shafts, 60,000 shp (45 MW)
- Speed: 35 knots (65 km/h; 40 mph)
- Range: 4,500 nmi (8,300 km) at 20 kn (37 km/h; 23 mph)
- Complement: 336
- Armament: 6 × 5"/38 caliber guns; 12 × 40 mm AA guns; 11 × 20 mm AA guns; 10 × 21 inch (533 mm) torpedo tubes; 6 × depth charge projectors; 2 × depth charge tracks

USS Dennis J. Buckley (DD/DDR-808) was a Gearing-class destroyer of the United States Navy.

== Namesake ==
Dennis Joseph Buckley Jr. was born on 22 April 1920, in Holyoke, Massachusetts. He enlisted in the Navy on 30 September 1940. Fireman First Class Buckley was posthumously awarded the Silver Star for displaying exceptional courage in attempting to salvage the German blockade runner Karin which had been intercepted by his ship, the destroyer USS Eberle on 10 March 1943. The explosion of demolition charges planted by the blockade runner's crew took his life.

The destroyer escort USS Dennis J. Buckley (DE-553) was named for him, but its construction was canceled on 10 June 1944.

== Construction and commissioning ==
Dennis J. Buckley was launched on 20 December 1944 by Bath Iron Works Corp., Bath, Maine; sponsored by Mrs. D. J. Buckley, mother of F/1c Buckley; and commissioned on 2 March 1945.

== Service history ==
=== 1945–1955 ===
Dennis J. Buckley sailed from Norfolk on 7 November 1945 for occupation duty in the Western Pacific, arriving at Tokyo Bay on 22 December. She operated in the Marianas and visited Manila, Philippine Islands, before returning to San Diego on 13 April 1946. On her second tour of duty in the Far East, in 1947, she cruised off the coast of China providing services to the Fleet and joined in exercises off Okinawa. On 1 October 1948 she steamed for Tsingtao, China, where she patrolled during the evacuation of civilians from the threat of the Communist advance into northern China. She joined Tarawa (CV-40) and Hawkins (DD-873) and sailed by way of Hong Kong and Singapore; Colombo, Ceylon; Bahrein and Jidda, Saudi Arabia; and Port Said, Egypt, to Athens, Greece where the three ships joined others for a visit to Istanbul, Turkey. She returned to New York on 22 February 1949, completing a round-the-world cruise. Dennis J. Buckley departed New York on 1 March 1949 for a brief period of operations on the west coast, returning to the Canal Zone 10 May for exercises in Caribbean waters.

She was re-classified a radar picket destroyer, DDR-808, on 18 March 1949. She then operated along the eastern seaboard from Norfolk to NS Argentia, Newfoundland and sailed from Newport on 15 April for a tour of duty in the Mediterranean with the 6th Fleet, returning to Newport on 6 October for local and Caribbean operations. From April to October 1951 she cruised to northern Europe, visiting Plymouth, Liverpool, and Weymouth, England; Bremerhaven, Germany; Antwerp, Belgium; and Cork, Ireland and Derry, Northern Ireland.

Between 1952 and 1955, Dennis J. Buckley completed three tours of duty in the Mediterranean, and served as gunnery and engineering school ship for destroyer officers. She participated in air defense exercises in the North Atlantic and the Gulf of Mexico and trained midshipmen and reservists.

=== 1956–1960 ===
Dennis J. Buckley sailed from Boston on 1 May 1956 to join the Pacific Fleet. Arriving at Long Beach on 28 June, she got underway on 9 July for a tour of duty in the western Pacific from which she returned to Long Beach on 21 October. During her second Far Eastern tour, in 1957, she screened Princeton (CV-37), patrolled off Taiwan briefly, and served as flagship for Commander, Destroyer Flotillas, western Pacific, during October, when she was visited by the Chief of Naval Operations, Admiral Arleigh A. Burke. Local operations engaged Dennis J. Buckley until 23 August 1958 when she again sailed for the Far East where she joined Task Force 72 (TF 72) to resupply Nationalist Chinese holding the Quemoy Islands against the threat of Communist seizure.

Returning to Long Beach on 27 February 1959, she sailed again for duty in the western Pacific on 15 October. She returned to Long Beach on 11 March 1960 for operations until May, underwent a three-month overhaul, and then resumed west coast duty for the remainder of the year.

detailed history, 1945–1967 at djbuckley.com

detailed history, 1968–1973 at djbuckley.com

On 2 July 1973, Dennis J. Buckley was decommissioned and stricken from Naval Vessel Register and custody accepted by Naval Inactive Ship Maintenance Facility, San Diego. On 29 April 1974 the ex-Buckley was sold to Levin Metals Corp. for $314,699.00, which started scrapping her in Richmond, California on 3 July 1974.
