= Buckbee, Wisconsin =

- Unincorporated community
- Location within Wisconsin Location within the United States
- Coordinates: 44°38′56″N 88°50′06″W
- Country: United States
- State: Wisconsin
- County: Waupaca
- Elevation: 827 ft (252 m)
- Time zone: UTC-6 (Central (CST))
  - Summer (DST): UTC-5 (CDT)
- ZIP codes: 54950
- Area codes: 715 & 534
- GNIS feature ID: 1577529

Buckbee is an unincorporated community in the Town of Larrabee, Waupaca County, Wisconsin, United States.

== Transportation ==
Buckbee is located approximately 1 mile (1.6 km) southeast of Marion along U.S. Route 45.

== History ==
The community is named for J.E. Buckbee, a Union colonel in the American Civil War.
