= Bugley =

Hamlet in Dorset, England

Coordinates: 51.0207°N 2.3071°W

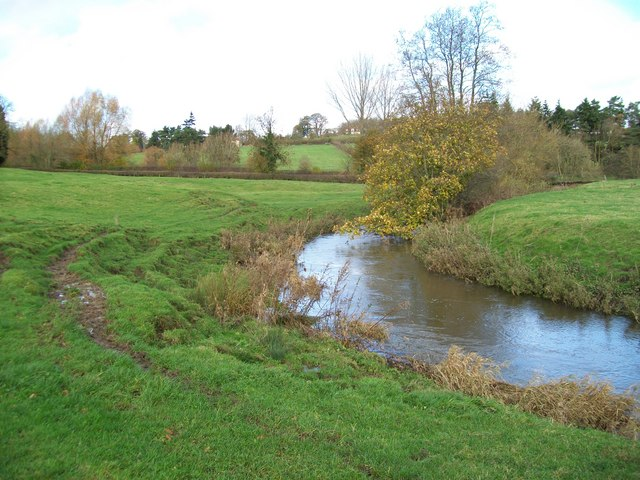
River Stour at Bugley

Bugley is a small hamlet in the county of Dorset, England. The River Stour runs past the hamlet. It is close to the town of Gillingham.
