= Darnley (disambiguation) =

Darnley may refer to:

== People ==
- Henry Stuart, Lord Darnley, consort of Mary, Queen of Scots
- Earl of Darnley, peerage title

== Places ==
- Darnley, part of Glasgow, Scotland
- Darnley Island (Queensland), Queensland, Australia
- Two places in Antarctica
  - Cape Darnley (Mac. Robertson Land)
  - Cape Darnley (South Georgia)
- Two places in Canada
  - Darnley, Prince Edward Island
  - Darnley Bay, Northwest Territories

== Fiction ==
- Darnley, a fictional city in Philip George Chadwick's The Death Guard
- Darnley Mills, a fictional town in books by Philip Turner
- Darnley, or, The Field of the Cloth of Gold, an 1830 novel by George Payne Rainsford James

== See also ==
- Darnley Lime Works Tramway and Mineral Railway
- Dams to Darnley Country Park
