= Buckley River Important Bird Area =

Important Bird Area in Queensland, Australia

Coordinates: 20°01′58″S 139°15′31″E

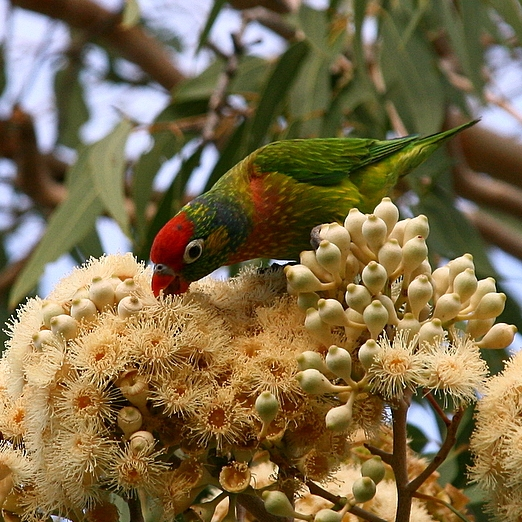
The IBA supports varied lorikeets

The Buckley River Important Bird Area comprises a 4790 km^{2} tract of land in the Gulf Country of north-western Queensland, Australia. It lies about 20 km north of the mining city of Mount Isa in the Waggaboonyah Range. It is an important site for Carpentarian grasswrens.

== Description ==
The boundary of the Important Bird Area (IBA) is defined by the boundaries of pastoral leases containing sites at which the grasswrens have been recorded. The Buckley River, a major tributary of the Georgina River system of the Lake Eyre Basin, runs through the central parts of the IBA and has its source within it. Some 95% of the site is within cattle stations, about 80% is covered by mineral exploration leases, and about 5% is subject to active mining leases. Landforms include gently undulating plains and low hills. Areas favoured by the grasswrens are characterised by laterites, shallow loams and clays, and skeletal soils.

The vegetation generally consists of tropical savanna open woodland, with scattered shrubs and trees of Eucalyptus leucophylla, E. leucophloia and Corymbia terminalis, and a ground layer of large Triodia hummocks separated by bare ground. Patches of gidgee occur throughout. Several seasonal streams have fringing vegetation of Eucalyptus camaldulensis with Lophostemon grandiflorus. In the south of the IBA there are small areas of the grass Dichanthium fecundum and Astrebla tussock grassland on clay plains.

== Birds ==
The site has been identified as an IBA by BirdLife International because it contains the largest population of Carpentarian grasswrens. It also supports dusky and Kalkadoon grasswrens, Australian bustards, varied lorikeets, white-gaped, yellow-tinted, banded and grey-headed honeyeaters, silver-crowned friarbirds, long-tailed finches, painted firetails and spinifexbirds.
