= Buckby (surname) =

Buckby is a surname. Notable people with the surname include:

- Jack Buckby (born 1993), British activist
- Malcolm Buckby (born 1951), Australian politician

== See also ==
- Buckbee
- Long Buckby
