= Rochdale power station =

Former coal-fired power station

- Country: England
- Location: Rochdale Lancashire
- Coordinates: 53°36′53″N 02°09′58″W
- Status: Decommissioned and demolished
- Construction began: 1898
- Commission date: 1901
- Decommission date: 1958
- Owners: Rochdale Corporation (1900–1948); British Electricity Authority (1948–1955); Central Electricity Authority (1955–1957); Central Electricity Generating Board (1958)
- Operator: As owner

Thermal power station
- Primary fuel: Coal
- Turbine technology: steam turbines

Power generation
- Units operational: 3 x 412 kW, 1 x 500 kW, 3 x 1000 kW, 2 x 3000 kW
- Nameplate capacity: 10,736 kW (1923)
- Annual net output: 31,000 MWh (1923)

Rochdale power station supplied electricity to the town of Rochdale, Lancashire from 1901 to the 1958. The coal-fired power station was owned and operated by Rochdale Corporation prior to the nationalisation of the British electricity industry in 1948. It was redeveloped as demand for electricity grew and old plant was replaced, and had an ultimate generating capacity of 10.7 MW in the 1920s. The station closed on 1 April 1958.

== History ==
In 1898 Rochdale Corporation applied for a provisional order under the Electric Lighting Acts to generate and supply electricity to the town. The Rochdale Electric Lighting Order 1898 was granted by the Board of Trade and was confirmed by Parliament through the Electric Lighting Orders Confirmation (No. 6) Act 1898 (61 & 62 Vict. c. xcii). The corporation built a power station at the junction of Bridge Street (now Mellor Street) and Dane Street, Rochdale (53°36′53″N 2°9′58″W) adjacent to the River Roch, and first supplied electricity to the town in 1901.

The power station supplied electricity for the Rochdale Corporation Tramways which operated a tramway service from 1901 to 1932.

By 1923 the generating capacity of the station was 10,736 kW. The Central Electricity Board constructed the National Grid (1927–33) to connect power stations and their electricity supply systems within a region. The Rochdale system was connected to the Lancashire Electric Power Company system in the mid-1920s. Larger modern power stations could generate electricity more efficiently than relatively small local stations such as Rochdale.

Rochdale Corporation continued as the owner of the power station and electricity supply system until nationalisation of the British electricity industry in 1948. Under nationalisation the Rochdale electricity undertaking was abolished, ownership of the power station was vested in the British Electricity Authority, and subsequently the Central Electricity Authority and the Central Electricity Generating Board (CEGB). At the same time the electricity distribution and sales responsibilities of the Rochdale electricity undertaking were transferred to the Merseyside and North Wales Electricity Board (MANWEB).

The power station produced an income for the corporation. Revenue from sales of current was £184,870 (1922) and £179,480 (1923). The surplus of revenue over expenses £49,127 (1922) and £43,940 (1923).

The power station continued to operate for another decade after nationalisation until it was closed on 1 April 1958 and was subsequently demolished. The site has been redeveloped with commercial premises.

== Technical specification ==
By 1923 the generating plant comprised:

- Coal-fired boilers supplying 141,000 lb/h (17.8 kg/s) of steam to:
- Generators
  - 3 × 412 kW reciprocating engines and direct current generator sets
  - 1 × 500 kW reciprocating engine and DC generator set
  - 3 × 1,000 turbo-alternators AC
  - 2 × 3,000 turbo-alternators AC

These machines had a total generating capacity of 10,736 kW, of which 1,736 kW was DC and 9,000 kW alternating current.

Electricity supplies were available to consumers at:

- 3-phase 50 HZ AC at 400 and 230 V
- DC at 440 and 220 volts
- DC traction current 500 volts

The final use of electricity over the period 1921–23 was:

Rochdale electricity use 1921–23
Electricity Use	Units	Year		
Electricity Use	Units	1921	1922	1923
Lighting and domestic	MWh	990	1,055	1,364
Public lighting	MWh	22	20	66
Traction	MWh	3,611	3,365	3,363
Power	MWh	11,927	16,749	25,419
Bulk supply	MWh	393	433	6,82
Total use	MWh	16,944	21,622	30,894

The electricity system operating parameters were:

Rochdale electricity system 1921–23
Operating	Units	Year		
Operating	Units	1921	1922	1923
Maximum load	kW	9,796	13,785	15,440
Total connections	kW	22,355	25,809	25,424
Load factor	Per cent	23.7	20.6	25.6

In the year 1946 Rochdale power station supplied 996,865 MWh of electricity, the maximum load was 8,110 kW.

== See also ==
- Timeline of the UK electricity supply industry
- List of power stations in England
