= USS Dennis J. Buckley (DE-553) =

American proposed Butler-class destroyer escort

History

United States
- Name: USS Dennis J. Buckley
- Namesake: Fireman First Class Dennis J. Buckley, Jr. (1920-1943), a U.S. Navy sailor and Silver Star recipient
- Builder: Boston Navy Yard, Boston, Massachusetts (proposed)
- Launched: Never
- Fate: Construction contract cancelled 10 June 1944

General characteristics
- Class & type: John C. Butler-class destroyer escort
- Displacement: 1,350 tons
- Length: 306 ft (93 m)
- Beam: 36 ft 8 in (11 m)
- Draft: 9 ft 5 in (3 m)
- Propulsion: 2 boilers, 2 geared turbine engines, 12,000 shp; 2 propellers
- Speed: 24 knots (44 km/h)
- Range: 6,000 nmi. (12,000 km) @ 12 kt
- Complement: 14 officers, 201 enlisted
- Armament: 2 × single 5 in (127 mm) guns; 2 × twin 40 mm (1.6 in) AA guns; 10 × single 20 mm (0.79 in) AA guns; 1 × triple 21 in (533 mm) torpedo tubes; 8 × depth charge throwers; 1 × Hedgehog ASW mortar; 2 × depth charge racks

USS Dennis J. Buckley (DE-553) was a proposed World War II United States Navy John C. Butler-class destroyer escort that was never completed.

Plans called for Dennis J. Buckley to be built at the Boston Navy Yard at Boston, Massachusetts. Her construction contract was cancelled on 10 June 1944 before she could be launched.

The name Dennis J. Buckley was reassigned to the destroyer USS Dennis J. Buckley (DD-808).
