= Dearnley =

Dearnley is a surname. Notable people with the surname include:

- Ben Dearnley (born 1964), English sculptor
- Christopher Dearnley (1930–2000), English organist
- Zak Dearnley (born 1998), English football player

== See also ==
- Darnley (disambiguation)
