= Entwistle (surname) =

Entwistle is an English surname. Notable people with the surname include:

- Alan Entwistle (1949–1996), British scholar of Hindi
- Antony Beauchamp Entwistle (1918–1957), British photographer
- Bobby Entwistle (1938–2000), English footballer
- Cyril Entwistle (1887–1974), British politician
- Darren Entwistle (b. 1962), Canadian businessman
- David Entwistle (b. 1964), United States Virgin Islands Olympic bobsledder
- Edward Entwistle (1815–1909), English railroad engineer
- Ernest Entwistle Cheesman (1898–1983), English botanist
- George Entwistle (b. 1962), British television producer
- Harold Entwistle, English-born American actor and theatre director
- Harry Entwistle (b. 1940), English-born Australian priest
- Ian Entwistle (b. 1986), English mixed martial artist
- James F. Entwistle (b. 1956), American diplomat
- John Entwistle (1944–2002), the original bass guitarist of The Who
- John Entwistle (cyclist) (1932–2013), British cyclist
- Jonty Entwistle (1868–unknown), English footballer
- Kirith Entwistle (born 1991), British politician
- Louisa Entwistle (born 1887), English suffragette
- MacKenzie Entwistle (b. 1999), Canadian ice hockey player
- Neil Entwistle (b. 1978), convicted of the 2006 murder of his wife and daughter
- Noel Entwistle (b. 1936), UK educational psychologist
- Peg Entwistle (1908–1932), British actress
- Ralph Entwistle (c. 1805–1830), English-Australian bushranger
- Robert Entwistle (1941–2019), English cricketer
- Vicky Entwistle (b. 1968), British actress
- Wayne Entwistle (b; 1958), English footballer

== See also ==
- Entwisle, a related surname
- Entwistle, a village in Lancashire
