= Watergrove Reservoir =

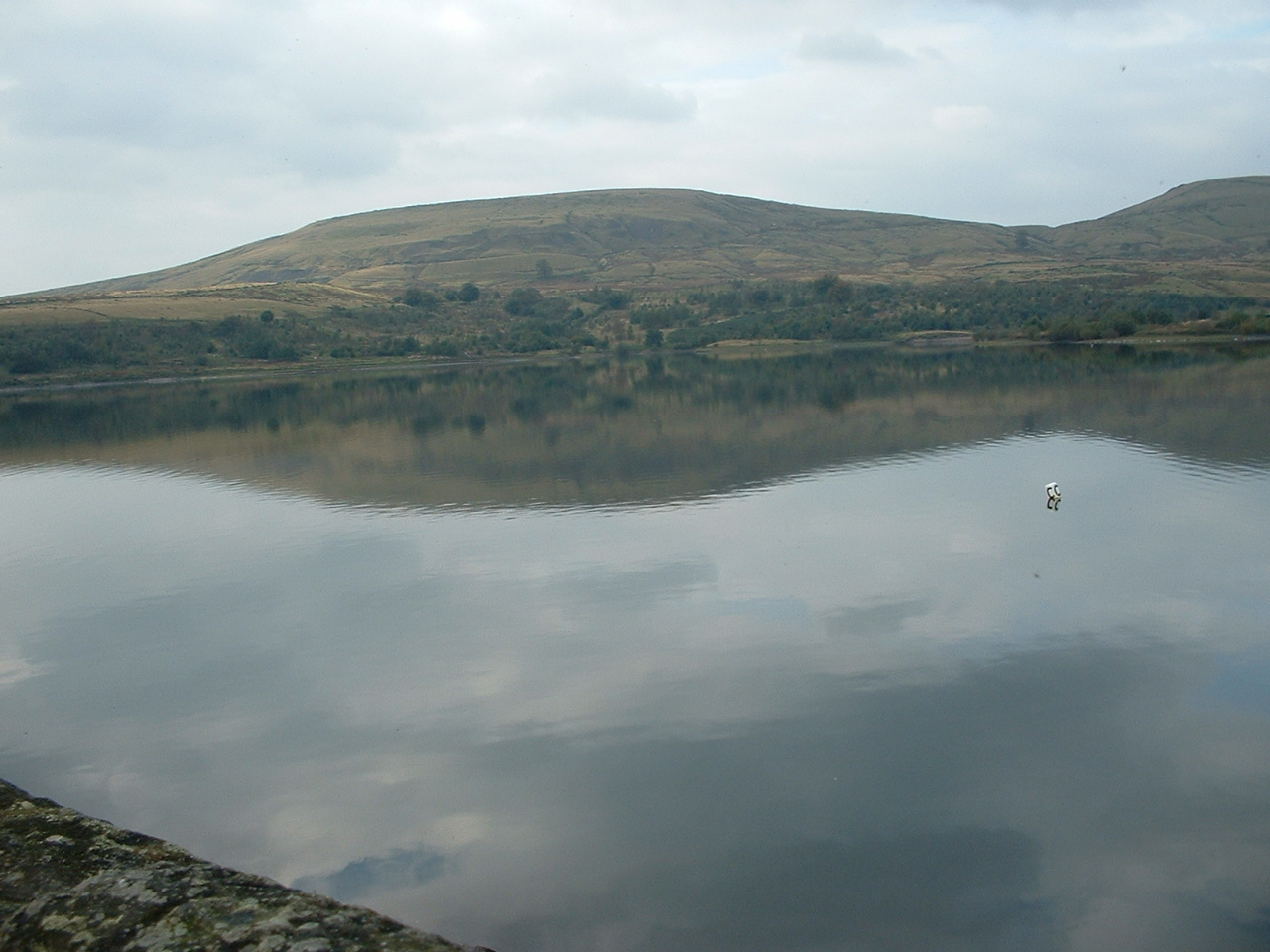

- Location within Greater Manchester
- Location: Greater Manchester
- Coordinates: 53°39′26″N 2°8′17″W
- Type: reservoir
- Primary inflows: Wardle Brook; Higher Slack Brook
- Primary outflows: Wardle Brook; Knowl Syke Brook
- Basin countries: United Kingdom

Watergrove Reservoir is a reservoir close to Wardle in the Metropolitan Borough of Rochdale, within Greater Manchester, England.

Rochdale Corporation chose Watergrove as a suitable site to build a large reservoir largely to a prolonged drought in the 1930s, resulting in water regularly being bought from Oldham. The ruins of the old village of Watergrove submerged under the large expanse of water in 1938, and dotted around the landscape above the reservoir there are several ruins originally belonging to the village.

The book Watergrove: A History of the Valley and its Drowned Village by Allen Holt gives a personal view of the transition as the author grew up in Wardle, a mile to the south of Watergrove. Several photographs in the book show people walking along roads that have resurfaced during times of extreme drought.

In July 2008, a 13-year-old boy, Joseph Thomas, was found dead in the reservoir after he had gone swimming with friends.

A free, weekly, 5 km Parkrun takes place every Saturday morning. The event is hosted by local volunteers and was first held on Saturday 7 June 2014.
