= Smallbridge, Greater Manchester =

Coordinates: 53.636168°N 2.127811°W

Smallbridge
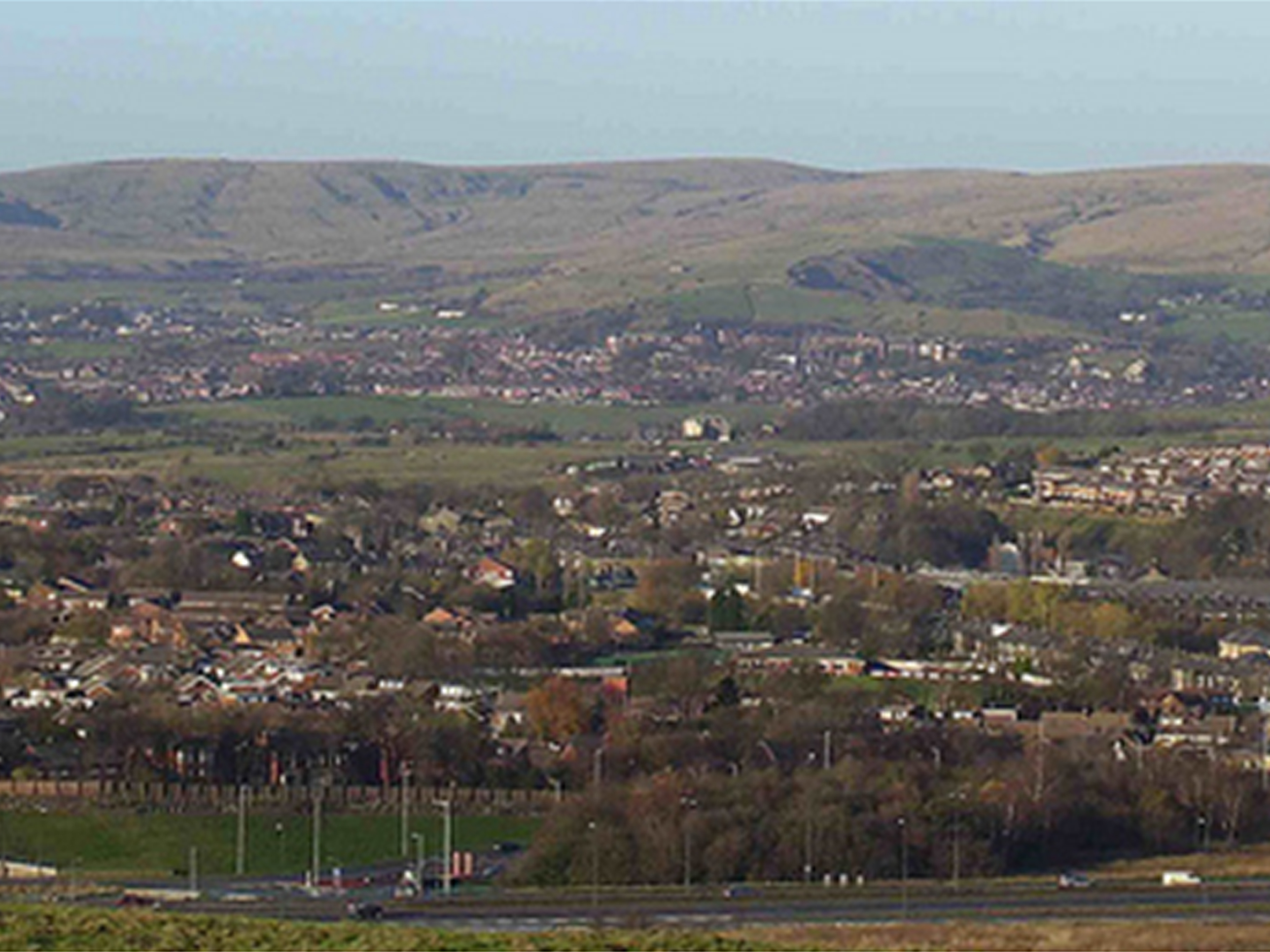
- A view over Smallbridge with Wardle in the distance

- Location within Greater Manchester
- Population: 11,469 (2011.Smallbridge and Firgrove ward)
- OS grid reference: SD915155
- Metropolitan borough: Rochdale
- Metropolitan county: Greater Manchester
- Region: North West
- Country: England
- Sovereign state: United Kingdom
- Post town: ROCHDALE
- Postcode district: OL16
- Dialling code: 01706
- Police: Greater Manchester
- Fire: Greater Manchester
- Ambulance: North West

Smallbridge is a district of Rochdale in Greater Manchester, England. It lies at the foothills of the Pennines, in the northeast of Rochdale, contiguous with Buckley, and to the south of the village of Wardle. The Rochdale ward is called Smallbridge and Firgrove. This ward had a population of 11,469 at the 2011 Census.

== See also ==
- Listed buildings in Wardle, Greater Manchester
