= Wardle, Greater Manchester =

Village in Greater Manchester, England

Wardle
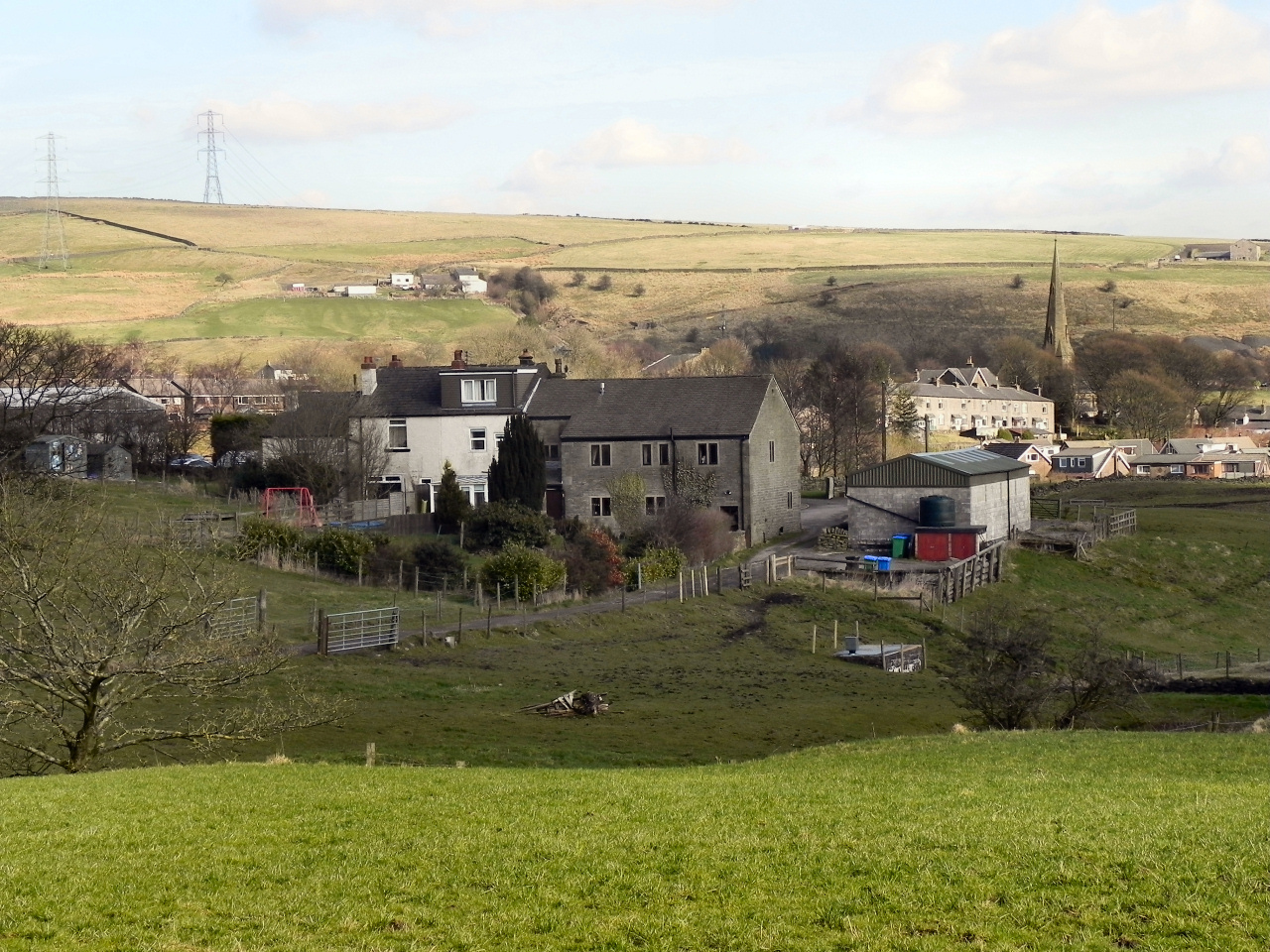
- A view towards Wardle

- Location within Greater Manchester
- Population: 7,092
- OS grid reference: SD912168
  - London: 170 mi (270 km) SSE
- Metropolitan borough: Rochdale
- Metropolitan county: Greater Manchester
- Region: North West
- Country: England
- Sovereign state: United Kingdom
- Post town: ROCHDALE
- Postcode district: OL12
- Dialling code: 01706
- Police: Greater Manchester
- Fire: Greater Manchester
- Ambulance: North West
- UK Parliament: Rochdale

Wardle (/ˈwɔːrdəl/; pop. 7,092) is a village near Littleborough within the Metropolitan Borough of Rochdale, in Greater Manchester, England. It lies amongst the foothills of the South Pennines, 1.8 miles (2.9 km) east-southeast of Whitworth, 2.5 miles (4 km) north-northwest of Rochdale and 12 miles (19 km) north-northeast of the city of Manchester.

Historically a part of Lancashire, Wardle and its surroundings have provided archaeological evidence of Mesolithic activity in the area. The name Wardle is said to be derived from "Ward Hill", implying "fortified place". Brown Wardle Hill overlooks the village from the north, its name being derived from the Celtic word bron meaning "round". During the Middle Ages Wardle was a small centre of domestic flannel and woollen cloth production, and many of the original weavers' cottages survive today as listed buildings.

Wardle, the most northerly settlement in Greater Manchester, encompasses small parts of Smallbridge and Dearnley — urban areas contiguous with Rochdale — but "retains a rural character". Watergrove Reservoir, which is situated on the northern outskirts of Wardle, is the largest of a series of reservoirs in the Borough of Rochdale, with a storage capacity of 720 million gallons. Wardle comprises 17th- and 18th-century stone churches, farmhouses and cottages by the hills. The village square is preserved as a place of historic interest.

== Governance ==
Lying within the historic county boundaries of Lancashire since the early 12th century, Wardle was anciently linked with Wuerdle, and lay within the township of Hundersfield and parish of Rochdale. Wuerdle and Wardle would later split from Hundersfield to form a township of itself, still within the parish of Rochdale and in the hundred of Salford.

Wardle's first local authority was a Local board of health established in 1874; Wuerdle and Wardle Local Board of Health was a regulatory body responsible for standards of hygiene and sanitation in the township. In 1879 part of the neighbouring township of Butterworth was included in the area of the Local Board. Under the Local Government Act 1894, the area of the local board broadly became the Wardle Urban District, a local government district in the Rochdale Poor Law Union and administrative county of Lancashire. Part of the Milnrow Urban District was added to it in the same year.

Under the Local Government Act 1972, the Wardle Urban District was abolished, and Wardle has, since 1 April 1974, formed an unparished area of the Metropolitan Borough of Rochdale, within the Metropolitan county of Greater Manchester.

== Geography ==
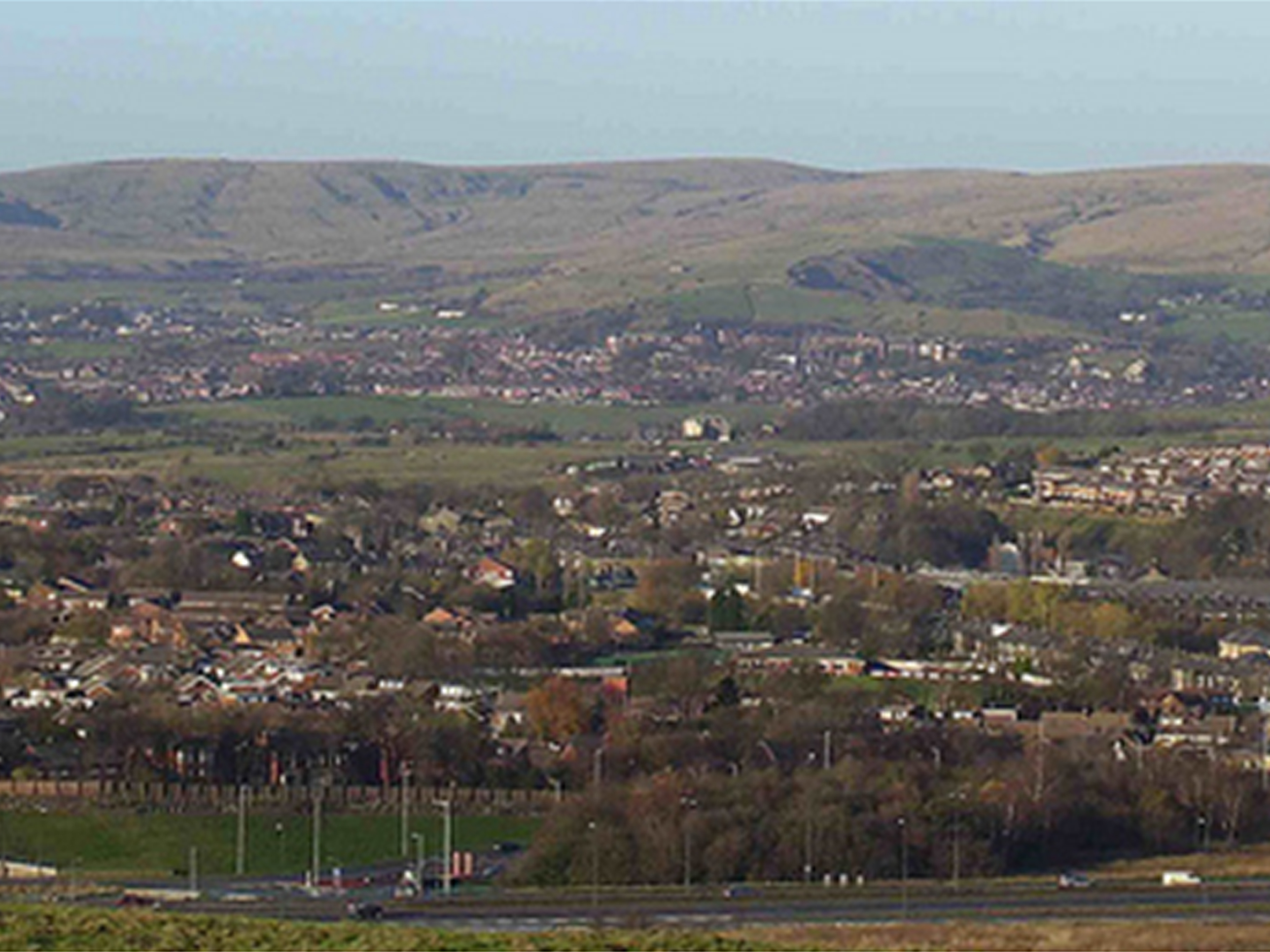
A view over Smallbridge towards Wardle

At 53°38′52″N 2°7′56″W (53.6478°, -2.1323°), and 170 miles (274 km) north-northwest of London, Wardle lies at the foothills of the Pennines, at the northeastern fringe of the Greater Manchester Urban Area, the United Kingdom's third largest conurbation. Wardle is the most northerly settlement in Greater Manchester.

Wardle is south of the Watergrove Reservoir and west of Littleborough.

== Education ==
The village is home to St James Primary School and a secondary school, Wardle Academy.

== Notable people ==
- James Leach (1761-1798), composer of nonconformist church music.
- Alan Middlebrough (1925–2004), footballer who played 47 games for Rochdale
- Sir Leslie Fowden (1925–2008), organic chemist and plant scientist
- Paul Waugh (born 1966 or 1967), politician and journalist, MP for Rochdale since 2024.
- Chris Schofield (born 1978), cricketer, who played 103 First-class cricket games and 2 Test cricket matches

== See also ==
- Listed buildings in Wardle, Greater Manchester
