= List of Sites of Special Scientific Interest in Tyne and Wear =

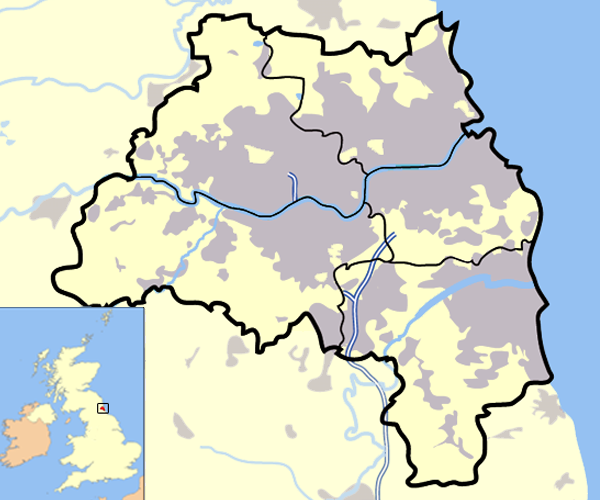
A map of Tyne and Wear, and its location within the United Kingdom also shown

There are 37 Sites of Special Scientific Interest (SSSIs) in Tyne and Wear, England. In England, the body responsible for designating SSSIs is Natural England, which chooses sites because of their flora, fauna, geological or physiographical features. Natural England took over the role of designating and managing SSSIs from English Nature in October 2006 when it was formed from the amalgamation of English Nature, parts of the Countryside Agency and the Rural Development Service. Natural England, like its predecessor, uses the 1974–1996 county system with each area being called an Area of Search.

Tyne and Wear is made up of five administrative local authorities consisting mainly of the two largest cities in the region: Newcastle-upon-Tyne and Sunderland, thus making it the sixth largest conurbation in the United Kingdom. Tyne and Wear shares its borders with Northumberland and County Durham, to the north and south respectively.

== Sites ==
Site name	Reason for Designation		Area^{[A]}		Grid reference^{[B]}	Year in which notified	References	
Site name	Biological interest	Geological interest	Hectares	Acres	Grid reference^{[B]}	Year in which notified	Map^{[C]}	Citation
Big Waters	✓		27.2	67.2	NZ227734	1985	Map	
Boldon Pastures	✓		3.5	8.6	NZ381616	1987	Map	
Brenkley Meadows	✓		9.2	22.7	NZ217744	1988	Map	
Claxheugh Rock and Ford Limestone Quarry	✓	✓	7.1	18.0	NZ363574	1987	Map	
Cleadon Hills	✓		10.0	24.6	NZ389631	1984	Map	
Dawson's Plantation Quarry		✓	0.7	1.7	NZ336547	1996	Map	
Durham Coast	✓	✓	765.4	1,891.0	NZ381685 – NZ495362	1999	Map	
Eppleton Grassland	✓		13.4	33.0			Map	
Fulwell and Carley Hill Quarries	✓	✓	6.0	14.8	NZ382598 & NZ388595	1987	Map	
Gibside	✓		89.0	219.9	NZ184590	1989	Map	
Gilleylaw Quarry		✓	0.2	0.6	NZ375537	1986	Map	
Gosforth Park	✓		37.3	92.1	NZ256702	1987	Map	
Hallow Hill	✓		7.0	17.3	NZ157658	1986	Map	
Harton Down Hill	✓		1.1	2.7	NZ390655	1984	Map	
Hastings Hill	✓		1.3	3.1	NZ353544	1984	Map	
Herrington Hill	✓		6.9	17.1	NZ367528	1983	Map	
Hetton Bogs	✓		11.0	27.0	NZ345486	1984	Map	
High Haining Hill	✓		2.9	7.2	NZ357507	1983	Map	
High Moorsley	✓	✓	6.8	16.8	NZ333454	1985	Map	
Humbledon Hill Quarry		✓	0.1	0.3	NZ382553	1985	Map	
Hylton Castle Cutting		✓	1.1	2.8	NZ360588	1986	Map	
Joe's Pond	✓		4.5	11.0	NZ328486	1984	Map	
Lower Derwent Meadows	✓		4.2	10.3	NZ190613	1986	Map	
Moorsley Banks	✓		5.5	13.7	NZ336459	1987	Map	
Northumberland Shore	✓	✓	1,925.8	47,574.0	NT980575 – NU010525 & NU165363 – NZ365685	1992	Map	
Pockerley Farm Pond	✓		1.4	3.4	NZ222555	1984	Map	
Prestwick Carr	✓		51.4	127.0	NZ189742	1986	Map	
Ridley Gill	✓		12.2	30.1	NZ217556	1985	Map	
Ryton Willows	✓		6.9	17.0	NZ 152650, NZ155649, NZ158649	1985	Map	
Shibdon Pond	✓		14.6	36.0	NZ195628	1985	Map	
South Hylton Pasture	✓		2.8	6.9	NZ357568	1984	Map	
Strother Hills	✓		8.1	20.0	NZ153579	1986	Map	
Thornley Wood	✓		14.8	36.6	NZ177608	1990	Map	
Tunstall Hills and Ryhope Cutting	✓	✓	15.8	39.0	NZ391546, NZ393540 & NZ399537	1988	Map	
Tynemouth To Seaton Sluice		✓	97.9	241.9	NZ346755, NZ365716, NZ373694	1989	Map	
Wear River Bank		✓	4.8	11.9	NZ360577	1989	Map	
West Farm Meadow, Boldon	✓		2.8	6.9	NZ358622	1989	Map	

== Notes ==
^{A} Data rounded to one decimal place.
^{B} Grid reference is based on the British national grid reference system, also known as OSGB36, and is the system used by the Ordnance Survey.
^{C} Those SSSIs with more than one OS grid reference are composed of multiple sections, separated by non-SSSI land.
