= Hampton Bishop =

Village in Herefordshire, England

Coordinates: 52.039°N 2.644°W

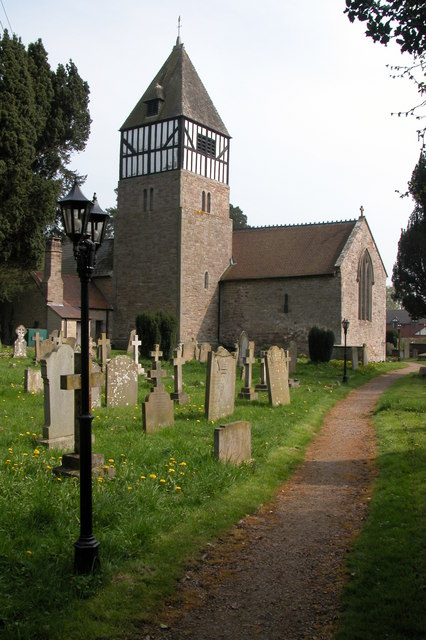
- St Andrew's Church

- Location within Herefordshire
- Population: 505 (2011 Census)
- Unitary authority: Herefordshire
- Shire county: Herefordshire
- Region: West Midlands
- Country: England
- Sovereign state: United Kingdom
- Post town: HEREFORD
- Postcode district: HR1
- Dialling code: 01432
- Police: West Mercia
- Fire: Hereford and Worcester
- Ambulance: West Midlands
- UK Parliament: North Herefordshire

Hampton Bishop is a village and civil parish south-east of Hereford, in Herefordshire, England. The population of the civil parish at the 2011 Census was 505. The village itself is on a wedge between the River Wye and the River Lugg, not far from where the River Frome meets the Lugg.

The 12th-century Anglican parish church is dedicated to St Andrew and is a Grade I listed building.

The local pub, the "Bunch of Carrots", is located in the centre of the village, on the B4224 road, next to a meander in the River Wye. According to David Rothwell's The Dictionary of Pub Names, the name is derived from a rock formation on the river, visible when the water level is low.

A pair of European bee-eaters made a nesting attempt here in 2005 (see Bee-eaters in Britain).
