= Stanley Crook =

Village in County Durham, England

Coordinates: 54.737°N 1.743°W

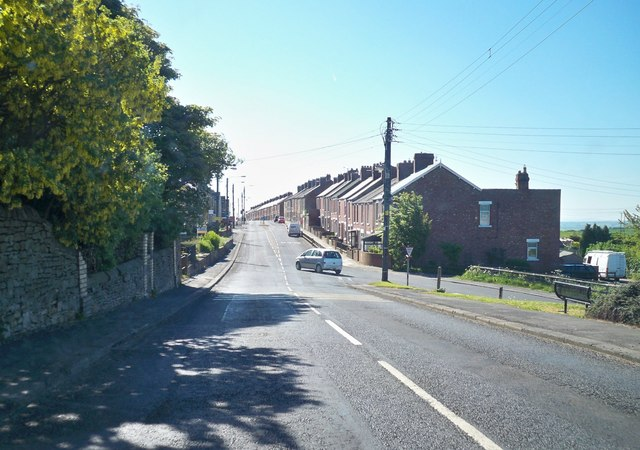
- Front Street

- Location within County Durham
- Population: 405 (2001)
- OS grid reference: NZ166380
- Unitary authority: County Durham
- Ceremonial county: County Durham
- Region: North East
- Country: England
- Sovereign state: United Kingdom
- Post town: Darlington
- Postcode district: DL15
- Police: Durham
- Fire: County Durham and Darlington
- Ambulance: North East

Stanley Crook is a village in County Durham, in England. It is situated to the north of Crook and Billy Row. The area is rural, surrounded by open farm land and woodland. There are several farms and many small holdings. It is a small former mining village which used to have two collieries. During the 1970s, the village was classified as category D, which meant the council wished to demolish the whole village. However, this did not happen, only 3 streets were demolished. In the 2001 census Stanley Crook had a population of 405.

The village has a BMX track and a football pitch, which until recently was home to Stanley United, one of England's oldest football clubs (who now play at Peases West). A park and a new housing estate is currently being built.

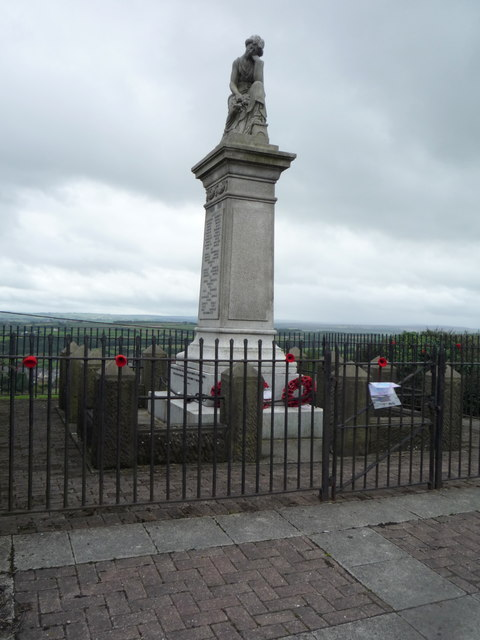
War memorial

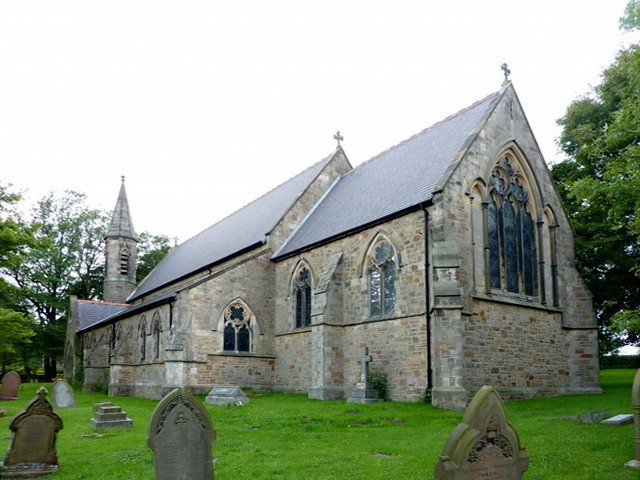
Church of St Thomas

The village's other facilities include primary school, a community centre, a petrol station, a small garden centre, a Church of England's Church of St Thomas. There is also a monument to World War II. It used to have a Methodist church but this has since been demolished and houses being built in its place.

Stanley Moss, a nature reserve of Durham Wildlife Trust, is nearby.

== History ==
Until the 1850s, the area was open moorland. It was not until Viscount Boyne of Brancepeth Castle, leased the mineral rights to Joseph Pease and Company that mining operations began. The first colliery was Stanley Pit then Wooley Colliery.

The name of the village comes from Stanley Hall, a medieval farm on the hill top to the north of the village. The area now known as Stanley Crook was originally known as Mount Pleasant, which, along with Wooley, was originally a separate village. During the 1870s, the Church of England wished to build a church for the village. The village was part of the parish of Brancepeth. When the village was separated from Brancepeth, the Church of England gave it the name of Stanley Crook, the Crook being added to differentiate it from the existing settlement called Stanley in County Durham.
