= Bee-eaters in Britain =

European Bee-Eaters bird in Britain

Two species of bee-eater have occurred as wild visitors to Britain, with two further species having occurred as an escape from captivity.

== European bee-eater ==
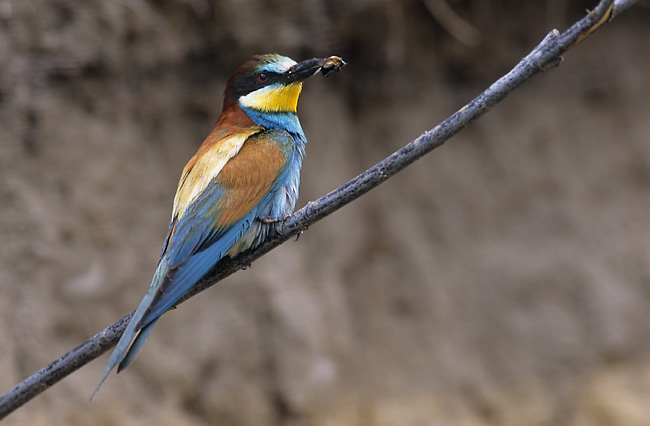
European bee-eater

The European bee-eater occurs in Britain mainly as a spring overshoot. Until the late 20th century the species was a national rarity i.e. a species whose records are collected by the British Birds Rarities Committee. Increasing numbers meant that it was downgraded to a "scarce migrant" from 1991. Bee-eaters are occasionally seen in Britain in autumn, but are much scarcer at that season. The species has occasionally bred. A flock of at least nine European bee-eaters was seen near Great Yarmouth and in other locations in the summer of 2021.

=== Breeding attempts ===
European bee-eaters have attempted to nest on several occasions in Britain:

- In 1920, a pair made a nesting attempt in a sand bank of the River Esk at Musselburgh, Scotland. A local gardener captured the female, keeping her in a greenhouse, and she died two days later, after laying a single egg.
- In 1955, three pairs of bee-eaters nested in Streat Sand Quarry near Plumpton, East Sussex. The birds were first found on 12 June, although the birds' presence only became widely known at the start of August. One nest was accidentally destroyed by machinery in July, but seven young fledged from the two remaining nests towards the end of August. An RSPB wardening operation was instigated, and in total over 1,000 people visited the site. The birds remained until 24 September.
- A pair nested at Bishop Middleham Quarry, County Durham in 2002. The birds were first found on 2 June, and within a few days started to undertake courtship feeding and copulation; five chicks hatched, but one died in the nest, one died before fledging, and a third disappeared and was also believed to have died. Durham Wildlife Trust (with RSPB assistance) set up a wardening post during the period when the birds were nesting. News was released to rare bird information services, and the national news media also reported on the birds' presence. In total, some 15,000 people visited the site during their stay; the adults and both fledged young were seen to leave on 28 August, when they flew off high to the south.
- A pair took up residence on farmland adjacent to the River Wye, near Hampton Bishop, Herefordshire in summer 2005; by mid-July the adults were bringing insect food to the riverbank nest-hole confirming that eggs had hatched. A wardening operation was set up by the RSPB, with public access granted, resulting in about 2,000 people seeing the birds. However, on the evening of 29 July, foxes predated the nest, and the birds soon left the site.
- A pair excavated a nest hole at a coastal site in Dorset in 2006, but this attempt failed.
- Two pairs of bee-eaters nested on the Isle of Wight in 2014. A viewing area was set up and run by RSPB and local volunteers enabling thousands of people to enjoy watching the adults hawking near the (hidden) nest site. Success rates unknown.
- Two pairs of bee-eaters nested in Low Gelt sand quarry near Brampton, Carlisle in the North Pennines, Cumbria. The birds were found on Friday, 31 July 2015, and were put under the RSPB's 24-hour nest protection programme. A viewing area was set up 200 metres from the nest.
- In June 2017, seven nested at CEMEX quarry East Leake, Nottinghamshire, attracting thousands of bird-watchers.
- In June 2022, seven nested at a disused quarry at Trimingham, near Cromer, Norfolk. Three young birds were successfully hatched and fledged before the flock left the country at the end of August.

== Blue-cheeked bee-eater ==
Eight sightings of the blue-cheeked bee-eater have been recorded. All individuals were adults, and all but one occurred in mid-summer.

- St Mary's, Isles of Scilly, 13 July 1921 (this bird was killed and the specimen is in the Isles of Scilly Museum)
- St Agnes, Isles of Scilly, 22 June 1951
- Peterborough, Cambridgeshire, 17 September 1982
- The Otter valley, Budleigh Salterton, Devon, from 30 June to 2 July 1987
- Kennack Sands and Cadgwith, The Lizard, Cornwall, 1 June 1989
- Cowden, East Yorkshire, from 8 to 10 July 1989 (also seen at Leverton Marsh, Lincolnshire on 12 July
- Church Hougham, Kent on 18 July 1989
- Bressay, Asta, Tingwall valley and Lerwick, Shetland from 20 June to 3 July 1997

== Escaped species ==
One occurrence of the white-fronted bee-eater has been recorded, as an escape from captivity.

The northern carmine bee-eater has also occurred when one spent 24 May 2002 at Mundesley, Norfolk. No doubt of captive origin, it behaved in a wild manner and easily caught plenty of insects.
