= Bishop Middleham Quarry =

Disused quarry in County Durham, England

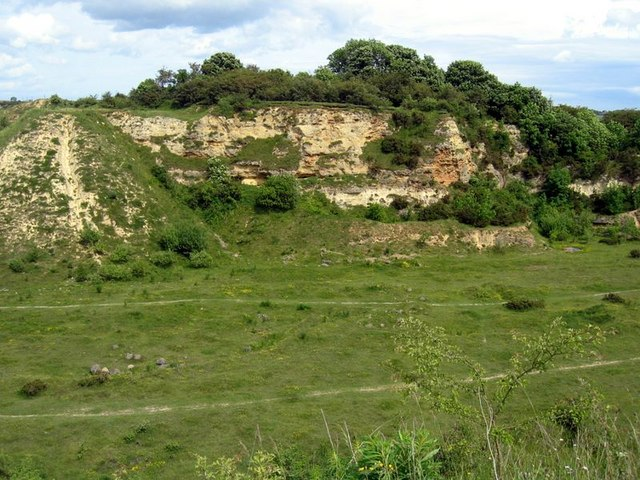
- Disused quarry at Bishop Middleham

- Location within County Durham
- Location: MAGiC MaP
- Nearest town: Sedgefield, County Durham
- Coordinates: 54°41′16″N 1°29′9″W
- Area: 8.6 ha (21 acres)
- Established: 1968 / 1982
- Governing body: Durham Wildlife Trust
- Website: Bishop Middleham Quarry SSSI

Bishop Middleham Quarry is a disused quarry, about 4 kilometres (2.5 mi) north-west of Sedgefield, County Durham, England. Quarry-working here ceased in 1934, and the site has since been colonised by vegetation. The underlying rock is Magnesian Limestone and this has had a strong influence in determining the range of plant and animal communities now found there.

In 1968 the quarry was designated as a biological Site of Special Scientific Interest (SSSI). The SSSI boundaries were revised in 1982 to exclude areas which were no longer found to have high wildlife interest due to tipping and quarry reworking.

The site contains a variety of vegetation types including woodland, scrub, and several grassland communities. The most important part of the site from a biodiversity conservation perspective is the species-rich unimproved magnesian limestone grassland, which covers just under 4.6 hectares (11 acres) of the site. Only 270 hectares (670 acres) of this habitat exist in Britain, two-thirds of it in County Durham.

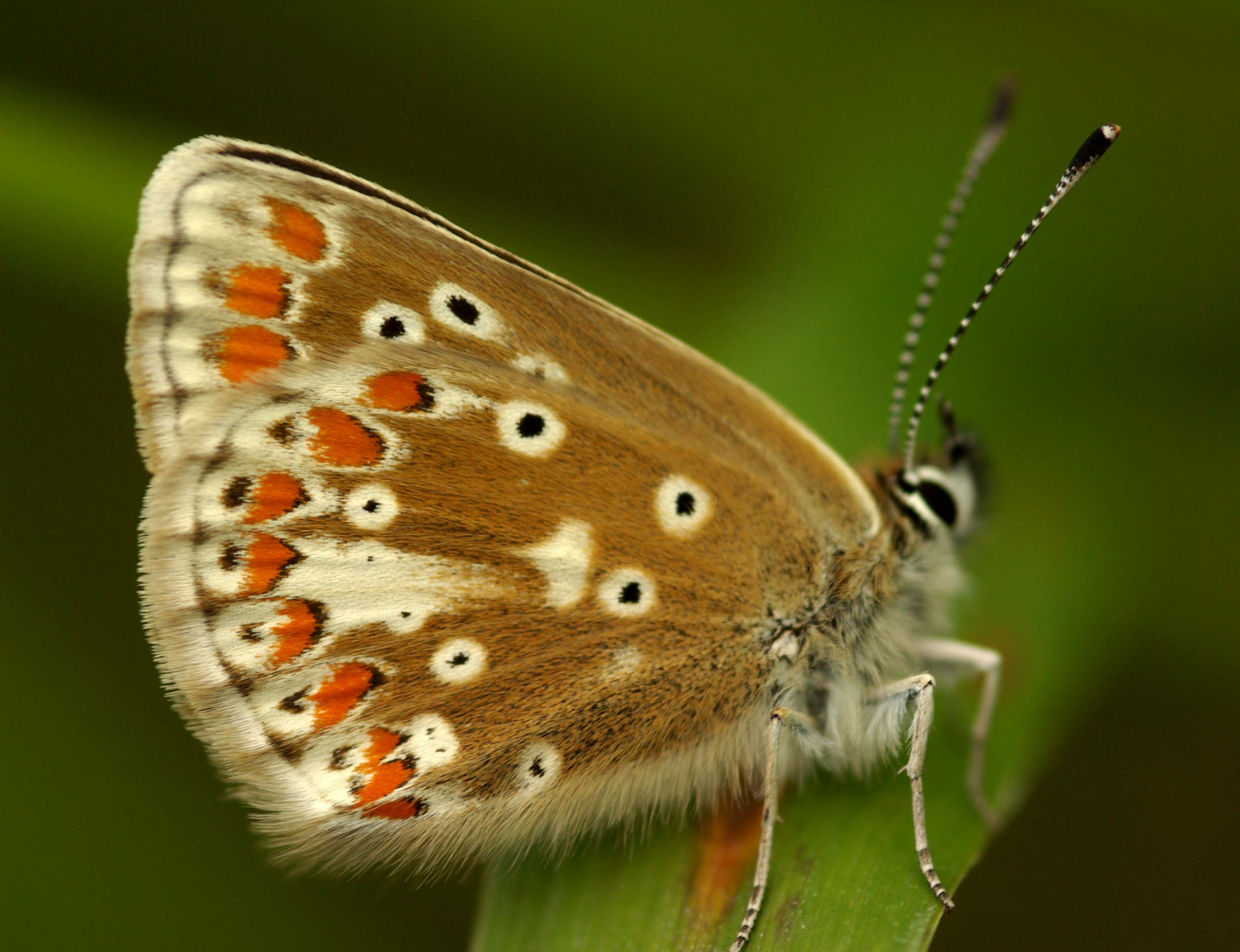
Brown argus butterfly in Bishop Middleham Quarry

Magnesian limestone grassland supports an assemblage of calcicolous plants adapted to growing in thin soils with a short sward. The quarry holds one of the largest British populations of the dark red helleborine, Epipactis atrorubens; a survey in 2010 found nearly 1700 flowering spikes of this nationally rare species. The quarry is a breeding site for the Durham argus butterfly, a local race of the brown argus found only in northeast England.

The site attracted the interest of birdwatchers in 2002 when a pair of European bee-eaters took up residence, raising two young, only the third breeding attempt ever in Britain.

Bishop Middleham Quarry is managed as a Nature Reserve by the Durham Wildlife Trust.
