= Witton-le-Wear (SSSI) =

SSSI in County Durham, England

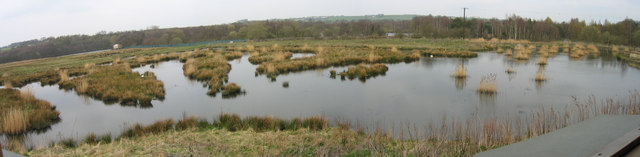
- Low Barnes Nature Reserve at Witton-le-Wear SSSI

- Location within County Durham
- Location: MAGiC MaP
- Nearest town: Bishop Auckland, County Durham
- Coordinates: 54°40′36″N 1°45′9″W
- Area: 36.908 ha (91.20 acres)
- Established: 1966
- Governing body: Natural England
- Website: Witton-le-Wear SSSI

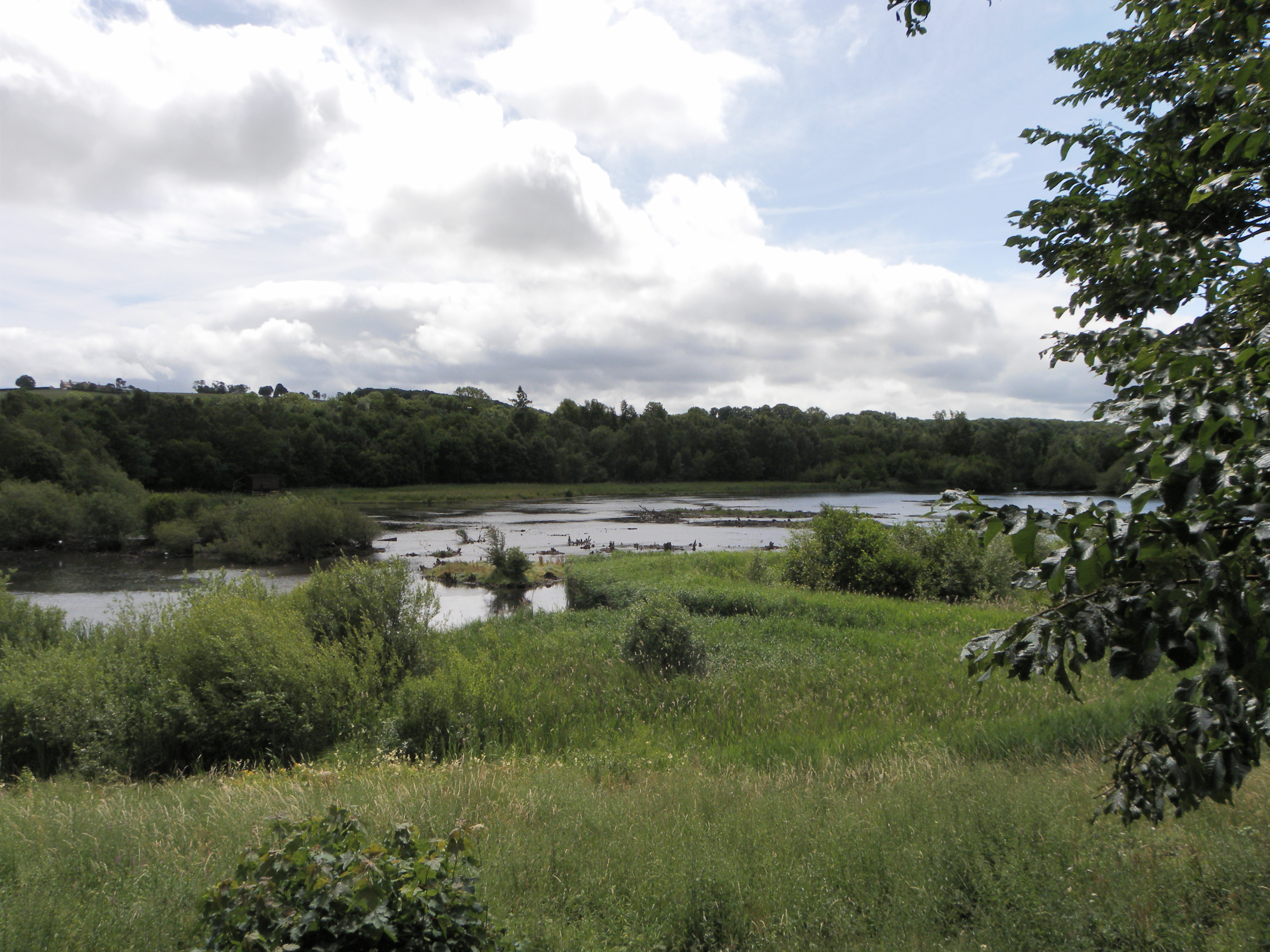
Low Barnes, Marston Lake

Witton-le-Wear (SSSI) is a Site of Special Scientific Interest located in the valley of the River Wear, immediately east of the village of Witton-le-Wear in County Durham, England.

It is important as the only extensive body of biologically significant open water in West Durham.

== SSSI status ==
Until 1964, the area now designated as an SSSI was used for sand and gravel extraction. When extraction ceased, the area was taken over by Durham Wildlife Trust, which developed the Low Barns Nature Reserve, on the site.

The site was designated as Witton-le-Wear SSSI in 1966. Minor revisions were made to the boundaries in 1987.

The nature reserve encompasses a visitor centre and a disused sewage works, neither of which is included in the SSSI.

== Geography, geology and ecology ==
The site occupies an area adjacent to the River Wear, being bounded on the south by the river and on the north by a former river channel which was abandoned when the Wear shifted its course during a flood in 1771. Being part of the river's floodplain, the area is underlain by riverine sands and gravels, which were formerly extracted; the abandoned workings were subsequently inundated, creating three lakes which are an important feature of the SSSI.

The total area of permanent standing water is 5.5 ha, though the area is subject to periodic flooding, when standing water can temporarily cover the entire site and fresh sediment is deposited. Part of Marston Lake, the largest of the three permanent lakes, is fringed with tall fen vegetation, characterised by Bulrush, Typha latifolia, Meadowsweet, Filipendula ulmaria, and Common Marsh-bedstraw, Galium palustre.

On the northern edge of the SSSI, a belt of mature woodland was left when the river abandoned its former channel. The dominant tree species is Alder, Alnus glutinosa, with a groundcover dominated by weed species, principally Common Nettle, Urtica dioica, and Greater Chickweed, Stellaria neglecta. In wetter areas, scrub woodland, consisting of a mix of Alder and Willows, Salix spp, is developing. In total, woodland covers an area of 12.4 ha.

Most of the site is covered by free-draining, sandy soils, on which neutral grassland has developed. The dominant grass species are False Oat-grass, Arrhenatherum elatius, and Common Bent, Agrostis capillaris, but a variety of herbs are present, including extensive patches dominated by three orchids, Northern Marsh, Dactylorhiza purpurella, Common Spotted, D. fuchsii, and Early Purple, Orchis mascula. The total area under grassland is 19.0 ha.

== Fauna and flora ==
A significant number of water birds breed on the lakes within the SSSI, including water rail, little grebe and great crested grebe. The open water bodies also support large numbers of wintering wildfowl.

Notable invertebrates include nine species of Odonata, including the Southern Hawker, Aeshna cyanea, as well as a grass-mining fly, Opomyza punctella, and a leaf beetle, Longitarsus reichei, which are locally rare.
