= Addison and Hedgefield Reserve =

Nature reserve in Tyne and Wear, England

Coordinates: 54°58′19.1″N 1°44′24.2″W

Addison and Hedgefield Reserve is a woodland area located in the region of Gateshead, United Kingdom, situated to the north of the B6317 to the west of Ryton, Tyne and Wear. The reserve holds historical significance as it was once the site of a working coal pit and a vibrant mining community. Today, it encompasses woodlands, scrub, grasslands, and wet grasslands, that contain a variety of plant and animal species.

== History ==
The Addison and Hedgefield Reserve holds a storied and significant history. In the 16th century, mining rights were granted to Queen Elizabeth I by the Bishop of Durham, and eventually, the Stella Coal Company took over the rights. The company established Addison Pit in 1864, a significant colliery that operated until its closure in December 1963. The 'first sod' at Addison Pit was cut on January 26, 1863, in a ceremony by Mrs. Addison Potter, after whom the pit was named to honor her family's connection with Townley Colliery. The pit's shafts were sunk in 1865 to a depth of 68 Fathoms (408 feet or 124 meters), two drift mines, Kitty and Atkinson, were also in operation. During World War II, the former Kitty drift was utilized as an air raid shelter. Today, one of the pit buildings still stands on Addison Industrial Estate, including the waggonshop, joiner's shop, and blacksmith's shop. Additionally, an entrance to a waggonway tunnel remains preserved. In 1877, Professor Alexander Graham Bell conducted an experimental underground telephone call from within the mine, during which he was heard at the surface singing 'God Save the Queen' and 'Auld Lang Syne.' Addison Pit was the first colliery in the world to have underground telephone. It was connected to Hedgefield House in which John B. Simpson, one of the colliery directors, lived from 1864 to 1894. The first offices of the Coal Company were rooms in Hedgefield House with separate offices built in 1894. Hedgefield House is now a hotel. Addison Village, a community, built around the pit, with most houses being 'back to back,' featuring one room upstairs and one downstairs. The village boasted amenities such as a Primitive Methodist Chapel, the Addison Male Voice Choir, a Drum and Fife Band, Boy Scouts, St. John's Ambulance Brigade, and the women's Apron Club. The Miners Welfare Association also provided recreational facilities. Over time, as the coal seams declined, miners gradually moved to other pits, resulting in a decline in the village's population. Due to limited public funding and a category D status designation, Addison Village faced demolition in 1958, and the community that once thrived in this mining region was eventually abandoned. Presently, little remains of the village except a few brickworks and archived photographs.

== Conservation and management ==
In June 2014, the management of Addison and Hedgefield Reserve was taken over by the Durham Wildlife Trust (DWT) from Gateshead Council. The DWT, along with its volunteers, is working to develop the area for wildlife, maintaining and enhancing the diverse habitats to support the flourishing plant and animal species.

The conservation efforts include controlling invasive species, promoting biodiversity, and conducting research to gain a deeper understanding of the reserve's ecology. By managing the reserve, DWT aims to ensure that future generations can continue to appreciate and enjoy the natural wonders of Addison and Hedgefield.

=== Flora and Fauna ===
Addison and Hedgefield Reserve support an array of flora and fauna. The wet grassland features colorful plants like ragged robin, valerian, and marsh marigold, while the drier areas are home to betony, pignut, tormentil, and lady's mantle. Scattered scrub provides essential cover for various bird species, including whitethroats, yellowhammers, and willow warblers.

== Notable Species ==
The reserve is home to a variety of notable species, including:

- Ragged-robin
- Marsh-marigold
- Pignut
- Tormentil
- Whitethroat
- Yellowhammer
- Willow warbler

These species, among others, contribute to the life that thrives within the reserve's diverse habitats.

== Visitor information ==
Addison and Hedgefield Reserve allows visitors throughout the year. Accessible via well-maintained trails, the size of the reserve is around 14 hectares it is open all hours and the best time to visit is April to July according to Durham Wildlife Trust

== See also ==
- County Durham
- Nature reserves in England
