= Durham Wildlife Trust =

Wildlife conservation charity

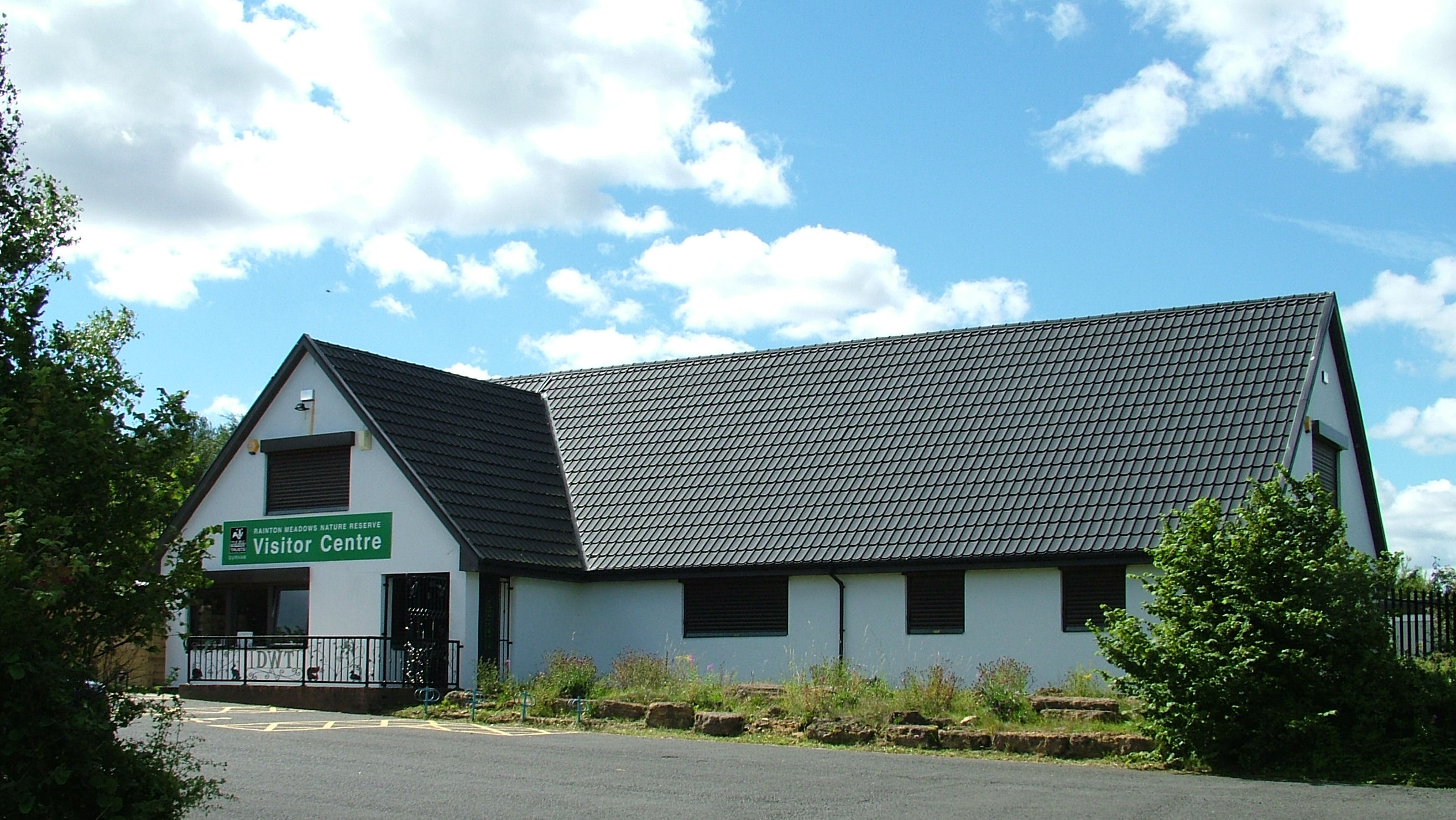
- Rainton Meadows Visitor Centre, HQ of Durham Wildlife Trust
- Formation: 1971
- Type: Registered charity
- Headquarters: Rainton Meadows, Houghton-le-Spring, Tyne and Wear, England
- Website: www.durhamwt.com

Durham Wildlife Trust is a registered charity that was established in 1971, originally as the Durham County Conservation Trust, becoming Durham Wildlife Trust in 1988. The Trust operates across the area of the old County Durham, which includes Darlington, Gateshead, South Tyneside and Sunderland.

Durham Wildlife Trust is part of the federation of 46 charities across the U.K. that together form the Wildlife Trusts. Recognised by their badger logo, each individual Wildlife Trust is an independent organisation conserving wildlife in its local area. The Trusts are membership organisations.

Durham Wildlife Trust manages 50 nature reserves between the Tees and the Tyne. The reserves include areas of ancient woodland, heathland, meadows, wetlands and more, and have helped to save important natural areas in the North East from destruction.

Today Durham Wildlife Trust continues to acquire new reserves and run large scale conservation projects.

== Projects ==
Durham Wildlife Trust leads and partners on numerous projects across the local area. The Trust is currently involved in projects to protect species such as the great crested newt, the water vole and the barn owl, and played an important part in helping to re-establish otters across the county's river catchments. Current and recent projects include the following.

=== Heart of Durham ===
The Heart of Durham project is a partnership between Durham Wildlife Trust and Northumbrian Water Limited. It is based around the edge of the North Pennines, from the Derwent Reservoir in the north to Hamsterley Forest in the south. The aim of the project is to restore and recreate areas of habitat so as to create spaces where wildlife can thrive on a landscape scale.

=== Nextdoor Nature ===
The Nextdoor Nature initiative is a £5m UK National Lottery funded project to be delivered by Wildlife Trusts across the country and will leave a natural legacy from the Platinum Jubilee of Queen Elizabeth II. Nextdoor Nature aims to create a network of community-led rewilding projects across the nation – all part of a total £22m of Lottery investment to mark the Jubilee and improve the lives of people from disadvantaged areas across the UK.

Through Nextdoor Nature, Durham Wildlife Trust supports community groups and schools across Sunderland, South Tyneside, East Durham, and Darlington, encouraging them to work with the wider community to bring wildlife back and make a difference for nature close to where they live.

=== Discover Brightwater ===
The Discover Brightwater Landscape Project is a National Lottery Heritage Fund supported project that aims to reveal, restore and celebrate the heritage of the Brightwater area – the River Skerne catchment. Durham Wildlife Trust are the programme leaders for this Landscape Partnership, which involves 19 different project streams including river habitat improvements, wetland creation, heritage and archaeology involving local communities around the River Skerne catchment from Trimdon Parish in the north to Darlington in the south and Shildon in the west. The project runs from the beginning of 2018 to the end of 2023.

=== Healing Nature ===
The Healing Nature Project ran from January 2021 until March 2022 and was a Green Recovery Challenge Fund project, funded by the Department for Environment, Food & Rural Affairs (DEFRA), and Gateshead Council, South Tyneside Council, and Sunderland Council.

The project undertook habitat work for wildlife conservation and engaged people and communities with their local area and greenspaces across 20 sites spread across Gateshead, Sunderland and South Tyneside. Public events were attended by over 845 people on project sites and over 531 children from over 29 schools engaged with nature through Healing Nature. Activities included 47.4 hectares of grassland management, 650 m of hedgerow planted, 1.15 hectares of native broadleaf woodland planted and 14,000 wildflower bulbs planted.

== Activities ==
=== Durham Biodiversity Partnership ===
The Durham Biodiversity Partnership, which covers the same geographic area as Durham Wildlife Trust, was established in 1996 to oversee the development, implementation and monitoring of the Durham Biodiversity Action Plan (BAP), which is the medium through which the United Kingdom Biodiversity Action Plan is translated into action within the county of Durham. Members of the Partnership include a wide range of organisations and individuals who have an interest in the BAP.

Durham Wildlife Trust plays an important role in the Partnership. It provides a home for the Partnership at Rainton Meadows, and is represented on the Partnership's steering group, alongside representatives from Natural England, the Environment Agency, the Forestry Commission, Northumbrian Water, the Farming and Wildlife Advisory Group, the North East Biodiversity Forum, and the county, city and borough councils within the area. The Trust also operates, on behalf of the Partnership, the Durham Biodiversity Data Service, which provides high-quality species and habitat data.

=== Durham Wildlife Services Ltd ===
Durham Wildlife Services is the Trust's consultancy arm, providing an ecological consultancy service to businesses and local authorities. Services offered include preliminary ecological appraisals, assessment of biodiversity net gain and protected species surveys. Profits generated by DWS support the work of Durham Wildlife Trust.

=== Education ===
Education is an important aspect of the Trust's work. The main education centre is at Rainton Meadows, near Houghton-le-Spring; as well as being conveniently close to the most populous parts of the county, in Sunderland, Gateshead and South Tyneside, this centre has an indoor classroom and conference centre. At Low Barns, near Bishop Auckland, there is a second education centre, which caters primarily to outdoor activities.

In addition to educational facilities at its own sites, the Trust also has an educational outreach programme, under which Trust staff make visits schools or community groups.

== Nature reserves ==
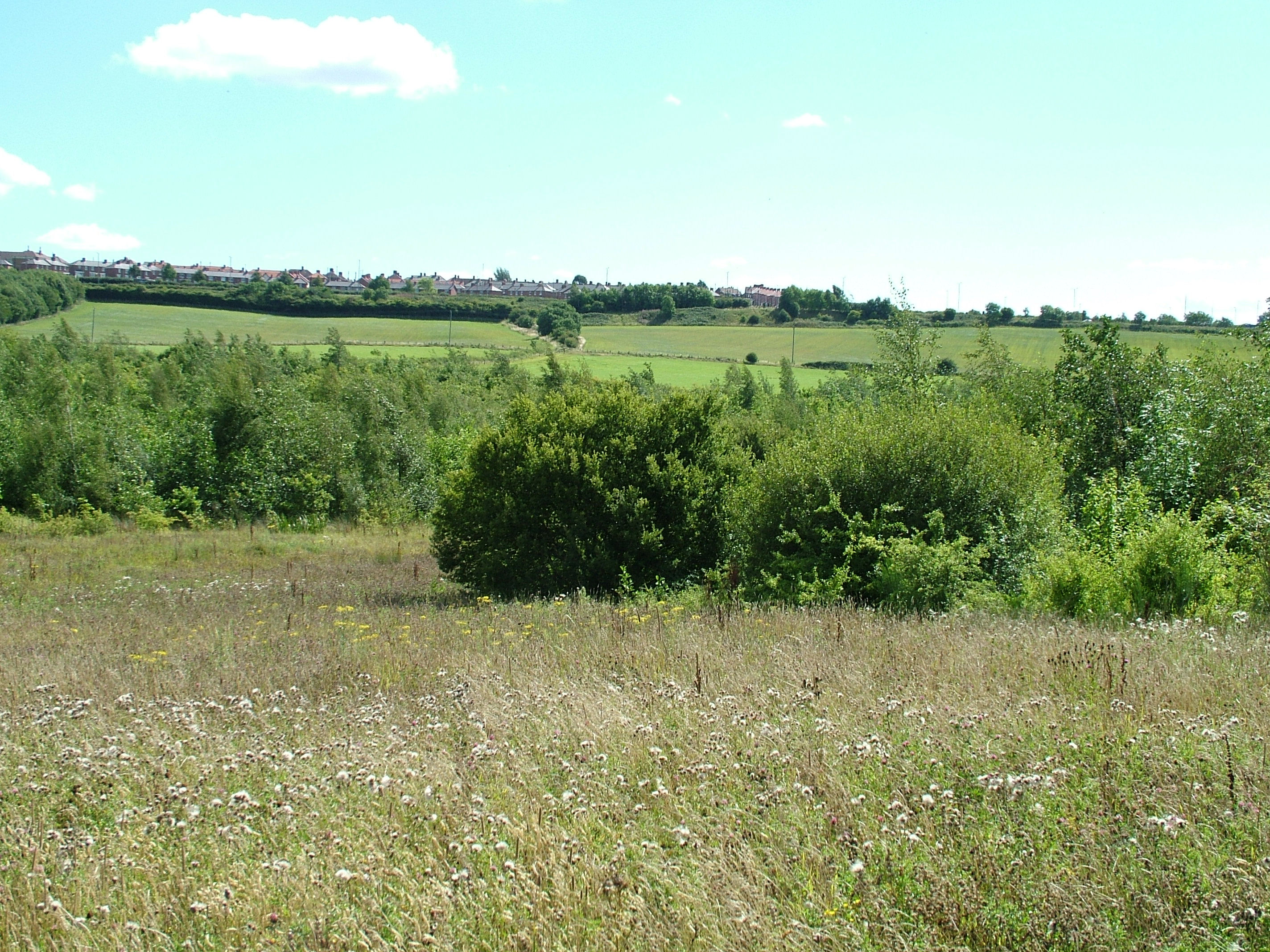
Rainton Meadows Nature Reserve, looking towards the village of East Rainton

Nature Reserves managed by the Trust include Bishop Middleham Quarry, Hawthorn Dene and Low Barns, and include a range of important habitats, such as Magnesian Limestone grasslands, upland hay meadows and coastal denes. The magnesian limestone grasslands managed by the Trust represent some of the finest examples of this particular habitat type.

The Trust's largest reserve is Hedleyhope Fell, near Tow Law at over 200 ha. It is one of the finest examples of recovering mid-altitude heathland in the county – a rare habitat in County Durham. The site is very important because it supports a range of rare and uncommon flora and fauna, including lesser skullcap, stag's-horn clubmoss and the velvet ant, which has not been recorded anywhere else in the county. It is also home to a large number of breeding birds and is an important site for the green hairstreak butterfly.

=== Sites ===
The 50 reserves that the Trust currently manages include the following:

Reserve ^{[A]}	Area (ha)	Grid reference ^{[B]}	Owner
Addison and Hedgefield	14.0	NZ167641	DWT
Baal Hill Wood	15.5	NZ069392	DWT
Barlow Burn	20.0	NZ156618	DWT
Bishop Middleham Quarry	10.0	NZ332326	Leased from Church Commissioners
Black Plantation	13.8	NZ137449	DWT
Blackhall Rocks	32.4	NZ470392	Leased from Durham County Council
Burnhope Pond	14.1	NZ183480	Leased from Durham County Council
Chopwell Meadows	17.0	NZ113584	DWT (part of site was former Chopwell Colliery)
Edmondsley Wood	12.5	NZ229493	DWT
Hannah's Meadows	8.8	NY934187	DWT
Hawthorn Dene	67.0	NZ433458	DWT / National Trust
Hedleyhope Fell	202.0	NZ139409	DWT
Hesleden Dene	8.5	NZ444377	DWT
High Wood NR	2.5	NZ128562	DWT
Joe's Pond	4.5	NZ328487	DWT
Longburnford Quarry	1.0	NZ072448	DWT
Low Barns	50	NZ163313	DWT
Malton NR	4.5	NZ182458	Leased from Durham County Council
Milkwellburn Wood	79.0	NZ114570	DWT
Rabbitbank Wood	7.0	NZ112483	DWT
Ragpath Heath	3.5	NZ144448	DWT
Rainton Meadows	60.0	NZ326485	UK Coal Ltd / City of Sunderland
Raisby Hill Grassland	11.5	NZ335355	DWT /Tarmac
Redcar Field	0.4	NZ292198	DWT / Natural England
Shibdon Pond	13.7	NZ194628	Metropolitan Borough of Gateshead Council
Stanley Moss NR	7.5	NZ150388	DWT
Town Kelloe Bank	5.0	NZ357371	DWT
Trimdon Grange Quarry	5.0	NZ361353	Leased from Durham County Council
Tudhoe Mill Wood	37.5	NZ254357	DWT / Whitwirth Estates

== Notes ==
^{A} Durham Wildlife Trust has listed information on habitats and access on each of its reserves on its website.
^{B} Grid references use the British national grid reference system (OSGB36), the system used on Ordnance Survey maps. The grid reference for each reserve relates to the approximate centre of the reserve.
