= Hedleyhope Fell =

Nature reserve in County Durham, England

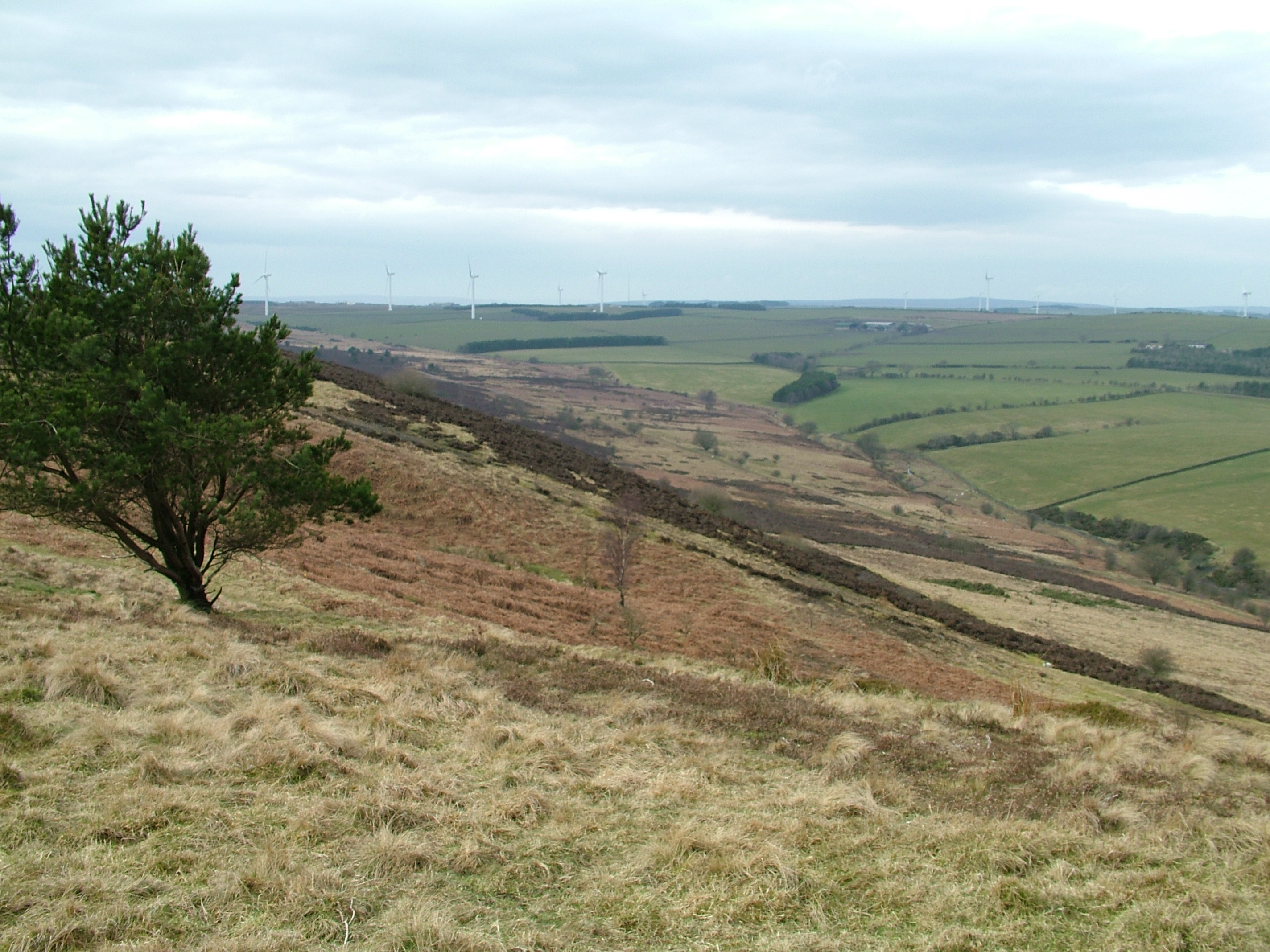
- A view of Hedleyhope Fell Nature Reserve, County Durham

- Location within County Durham
- Location: County Durham, England
- Coordinates: 54°46′56″N 1°46′59″W
- Area: 202 ha (500 acres)
- Established: 2006
- Named for: Old English hedley or headlam (heathery place) and hope (valley)
- Governing body: Durham Wildlife Trust
- Website: Reserve description

Hedleyhope Fell is a nature reserve to the north-east of Tow Law, County Durham, England. The reserve is managed by Durham Wildlife Trust and consists of some 202 hectares (500 acres) of mainly mid-altitude heathland. It occupies the steep slope on the right bank of Hedleyhope Burn, between the stream and the B6301 Tow Law–Cornsay Colliery road.

The reserve is common land and forms part of Hedleyhope Fell and Cornsay Common.
