= Backstone Bank and Baal Hill Woods =

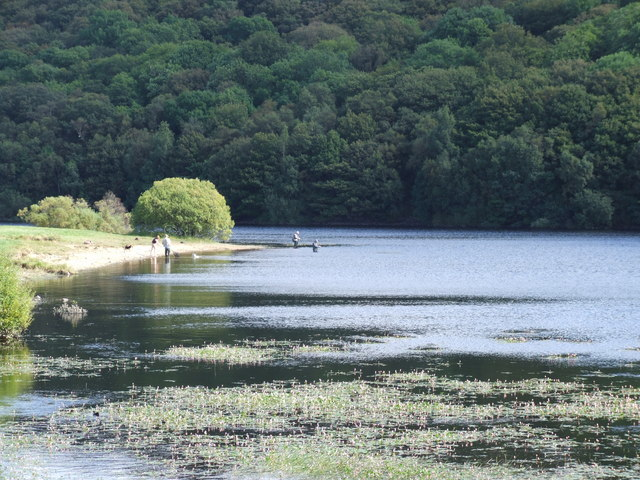
- Backstone Bank seen across Tunstall Reservoir

- Location within County Durham
- Location: MAGiC MaP
- Nearest town: Tow Law
- Coordinates: 54°45′38″N 1°53′42″W
- Area: 46.5 ha (115 acres)
- Established: 1987
- Governing body: Natural England
- Website: Backstone Bank and Baal Hill Woods SSSI

Backstone Bank and Baal Hill Woods is a Site of Special Scientific Interest in the County Durham district of Durham, England. It occupies the steep eastern slopes of the valley of Waskerley Beck, alongside and downstream of Tunstall Reservoir, some 3 km north of Wolsingham and is one of the largest expanses of semi-natural woodland in west Durham.

The area once formed part of a much larger expanse, Wolsingham Park, which was owned by the prince bishops of Durham from the late 13th century, and was protected both for its deer and for its timber. The woodland, originally predominantly oak and birch, was managed by coppicing for both timber and charcoal, the latter supplying the smelting kilns of the local lead industry. Historical records show that the site has been woodland since at least the early 16th century, and one large oak, the "Bishop Oak", is thought to be around 400 years old.

The woodland cover is very variable, being dependent on the soil and drainage. In wetter areas, alder, Alnus glutinosa, is dominant, over a ground cover that includes soft rush, Juncus effusus, meadowsweet, Filipendula ulmaria, and tufted hair-grass, Deschampsia cespitosa. In one side valley, there is a small population of small-leaved lime, Tilia cordata, which occurs here close to its northern limit and at an unusually high altitude.

On base-rich soils, the woodland typically consists of ash, Fraxinus excelsior, and wych elm, Ulmus glabra, over an understorey of hazel, Corylus avellana, and bird cherry, Prunus padus, and a rich ground flora that includes lady-fern, Athyrium filix-femina, male fern, Dryopteris filix-mas, and hard shield-fern, Polystichum aculeatum.

On more acid soils, sessile oak, Quercus petraea, and birch, Betula sp., are dominant. The under-storey, of hazel, holly, Ilex aquifolium, rowan, Sorbus aucuparia, and hawthorn, Crataegus monogyna, is sparse and the ground-cover is relatively poor.

As well as a diverse fauna, the site supports a variety of breeding birds, including woodcock, wood warbler, common redstart and pied flycatcher; common buzzard are also seen in the area. Roe deer are present in sufficient numbers to require measures to protect regenerating saplings.

The southern end of the site is owned by the Durham Wildlife Trust and is managed as the Baal Hill Wood nature reserve.

== Name ==
Various suggestions have been made to explain the origin of the name "Baal Hill". One, which is favoured by Durham Wildlife Trust, relates the name to the ancient lead-smelting industry, in which a "baal" (or "bail") is said to have been a local term for a pit in which lead ore was "boiled" to remove impurities. There are references in old manuscripts to "les Bolehill" at Wolsingham and to payments being made to "bolers". Another explanation is that "baal" derives from an old spelling of "bailiff" and that the nearby Baal Hill House, referred to in a manuscript of 1558 as "Baylehilhous", was at one time the residence of the Bishop of Durham's local bailiff. The modern name is a corruption of northern dialect bale, a signal fire or beacon, based on an association with the Baal, the Old Testament deity mentioned in the Book of Jeremiah.

Backstone Bank is mentioned in 1647 as Barkston Bank, a "hill where bakestones are found". Bakestones were flat stones that were used for baking in an oven.
