= Stanley Moss (nature reserve) =

Nature reserve in County Durham, England

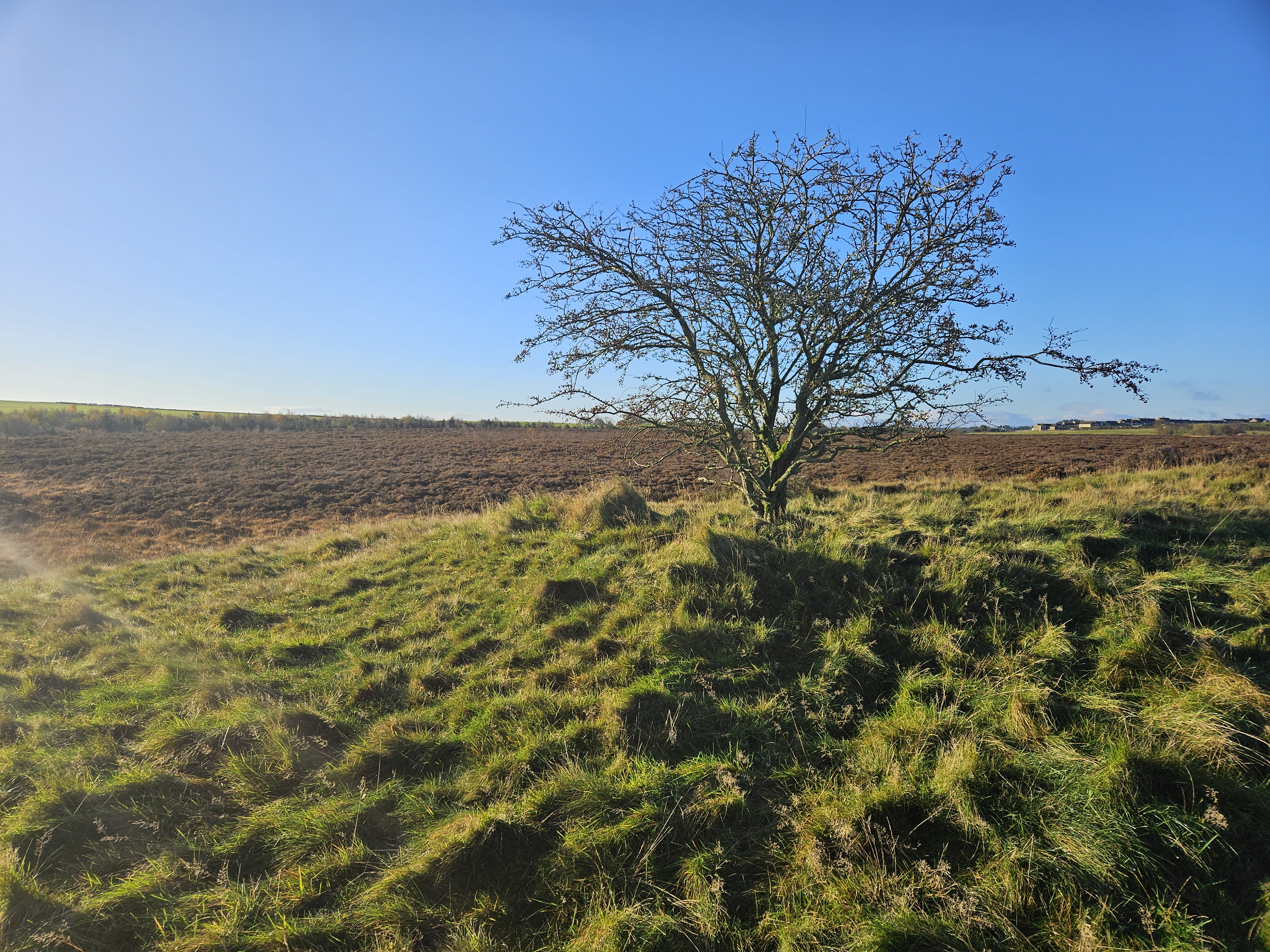

- Location within County Durham
- OS grid: NZ 1515 3879
- Coordinates: 54°44′38″N 1°45′58″W
- Area: 18 hectares (44 acres)
- Operator: Durham Wildlife Trust
- Designation: County Wildlife Site
- Website: www.durhamwt.com/nature-reserves/stanley-moss

Stanley Moss is nature reserve of Durham Wildlife Trust, a blanket bog near the village of Stanley Crook and about 2 miles (3 km) north of Crook, in County Durham, England. It is designated a County Wildlife Site.

== Description ==
Stanley Moss used to be significantly larger than its present size; terrain has been lost because of agricultural improvements, forestry and opencast coal mining.

The reserve, size 18 hectares (44 acres), was acquired in 2012 from the Banks Group, for the nominal sum of £1. At the time of purchase, reserves manager Mark Richardson said that the Trust "intends to restore Stanley Moss back to its former glory by reinstating the water table in areas where the bog has dried out". The area would be rehydrated by blocking old forestry drains.

Much of the site is uneven and very boggy, and not generally accessible; but there is a public footpath that runs north–south through the reserve. There is limited parking.

=== Blanket bog ===
This kind of terrain evolves over acidic bedrock where rainfall exceeds loss of water through evaporation and plant transpiration; the species of plants in this environment do not break down, and peat accumulates. The vegetation, having a barrier of peat below it, is fed only by rainwater, and the bog becomes low in nutrients. Blanket bog in the United Kingdom began to develop 5000 to 6000 years ago; it is in the west and north, and most of it is in Scotland.

=== Plants and wildlife ===
Sphagnum mosses grow in waterlogged areas. There are also more unusual plants, including crowberry and hare's-tail cotton-grass.

Birds to be seen include snipe, curlew, skylark and lapwing.

It was reported in 2016 that six black grouse, regarded as a globally endangered species, had been seen on the reserve. Ian Brown, of the Trust, remarked that it was an indicator of how the site was being managed, and said: "Hopefully, this group is significant enough to become a viable breeding population".
