= Raisby Hill Quarry =

Site of Special Scientific Interest in east County Durham, England

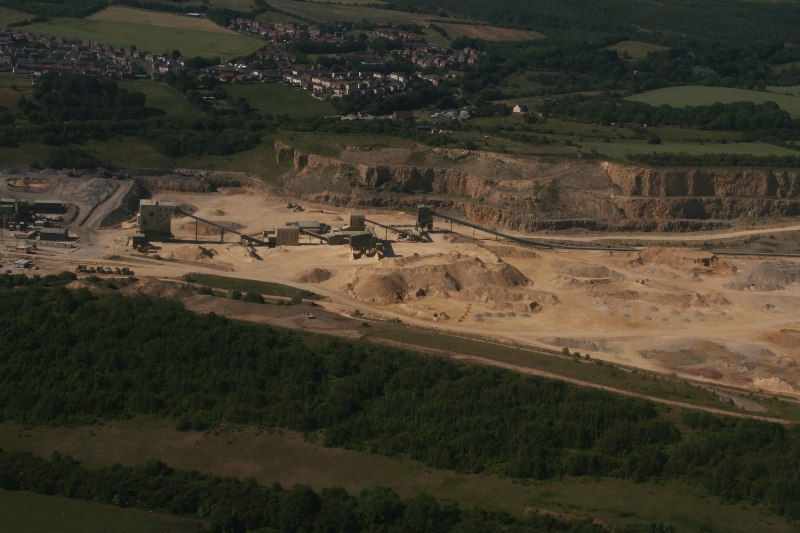
- An aerial view of Raisby Quarries in 2018

- Location within County Durham
- Location: MAGiC MaP
- Nearest city: City of Durham
- Coordinates: 54°42′43″N 1°28′12″W
- Area: 52.42 ha (129.5 acres)
- Established: 1957
- Governing body: Natural England
- Website: Raisby Hill Quarry SSSI

Raisby Hill Quarry is a Site of Special Scientific Interest in east County Durham, England. It lies just under 1.2 miles (2 km) east of the village of Coxhoe.

The site is a working quarry and has been designated as of national importance in the Geological Conservation Review. Until 1984, the site included most of the area that now forms the Raisby Hill Grassland SSSI.

The quarry exposes a section through the Marl Slate and the Ford and Raisby Formations of the Upper Permian. It is the type locality for the Raisby Formation, a carbonate unit of the English Zechstein sequence. The exposed sequence commences with the Yellow Sands, which are overlain by the Marl Slate and some 200 feet of calcareous and dolomitic limestones.
