= Rainton Meadows =

Nature reserve in north east England

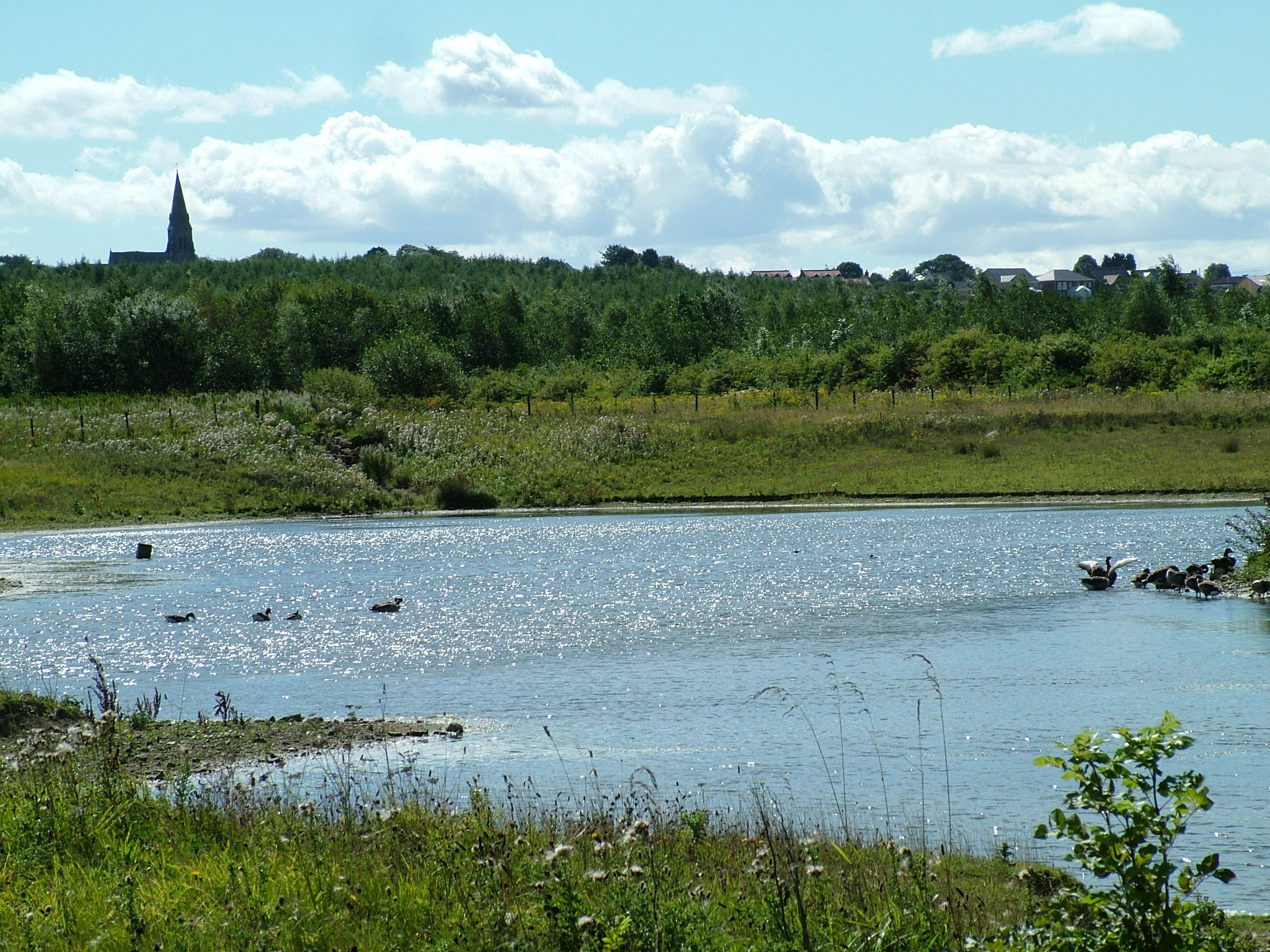
- View from a bird hide of one of the ponds at Rainton Meadows Nature Reserve, County Durham. The church spire in the distance is St Mary's, West Rainton.

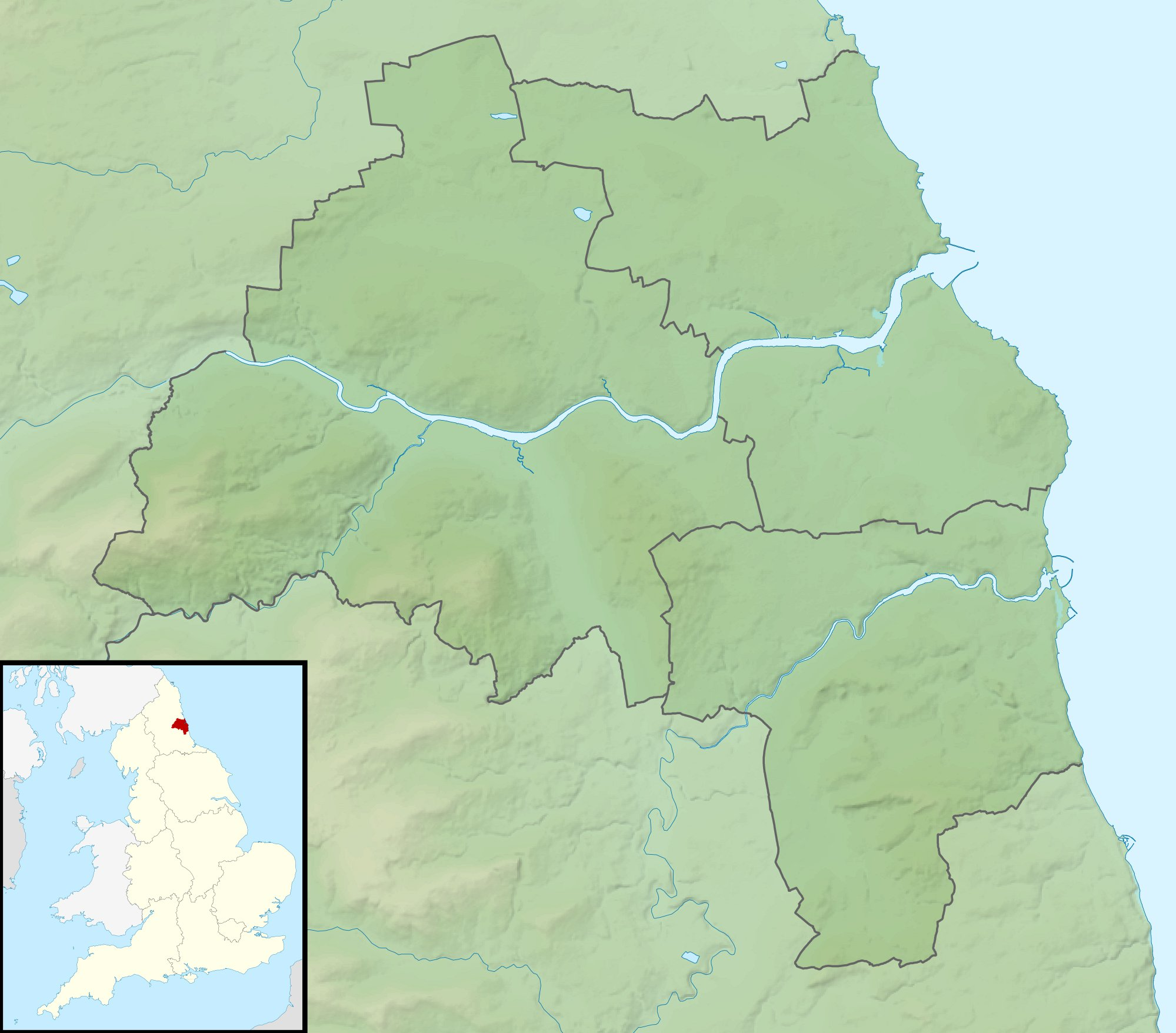
- Location within Tyne and Wear
- Location: Sunderland, Tyne and Wear, North East, England
- Coordinates: 54°49′44″N 1°27′36″W
- Area: 60 ha (150 acres)
- Established: 1997
- Governing body: Durham Wildlife Trust
- Website: Reserve details

Rainton Meadows is a nature reserve just to the west of East Rainton, County Durham, north-east England. The reserve, which covers 60 ha, and the adjacent Joe's Pond Site of Special Scientific Interest, are managed by Durham Wildlife Trust.

== Geography ==
The reserve occupies the site of the restored Rye Hill surface coal mine and now provides a wide variety of habitats including grassland, scrub, mature woodland and several ponds. Wildlife to be seen here includes mute swan, skylark, lapwing, short-eared owl and brown hare; roe deer, water voles, dragonflies, common frogs, common toads and smooth newts are also present. At the southern end of the reserve are damp meadows with hemlock and willowherb, and a dry meadow, which contains cowslips in the spring.

Rainton Meadows is the headquarters of the Durham Wildlife Trust, which also operates an educational centre, including a purpose-built classroom and a community wildlife garden.

== Directions ==
Rainton Meadows can be found by following the brown signs from the A690 between Durham and Sunderland. By bus, the Meadows is served by the 20A every 20 minutes and the 35 every 20 minutes and stops at Rainton Bridge, alternatively the 20 serves nearby with a 5/10 minute walk from the bottom of Gillas Lane West, the 4 and 71 also serve nearby Fencehouses and Chilton with a 15/20 minute walk.

== Facilities ==
=== Accessibility ===
- All areas are accessible to disabled visitors
- Toilets for disabled visitors
- Guide dogs are permitted
- Ramp / level access
- An on-site café offers tea, coffee, sweets, light refreshments and ice cream.
