= Chopwell Colliery =

Coal mine in Tyne and Wear, England

- Country: England
- Location: Chopwell
- Coordinates: 54°55′16″N 1°49′23″W
- Status: Demolished, portion of site is a nature reserve
- Construction began: 1781
- Decommission date: November 25, 1966

Thermal power station
- Primary fuel: Coal

Chopwell Colliery was a coal mine situated at Chopwell, in Gateshead, Tyne and Wear. The pit was first sunk in 1781, and was closed on 25 November 1966. The colliery was bought by the Consett Iron Company in 1896, before being handed over to the National Coal Board in 1947, when the British coal industry was nationalised. The colliery's highest employment numbers were in 1921, when 2,185 people worked there.

A coal-fired power station was situated at the colliery, which as well as generating its own electricity, received surplus electricity from the generating equipment at Derwenthaugh Coke Works.

== Nature reserve ==
After the closing of the colliery, part of the site was turned into the Chopwell Meadows Nature Reserve. In June 2014, Durham Wildlife Trust took over the management of this reserve from Gateshead Council and will continue the work to develop the area for wildlife.
