= Joe's Pond =

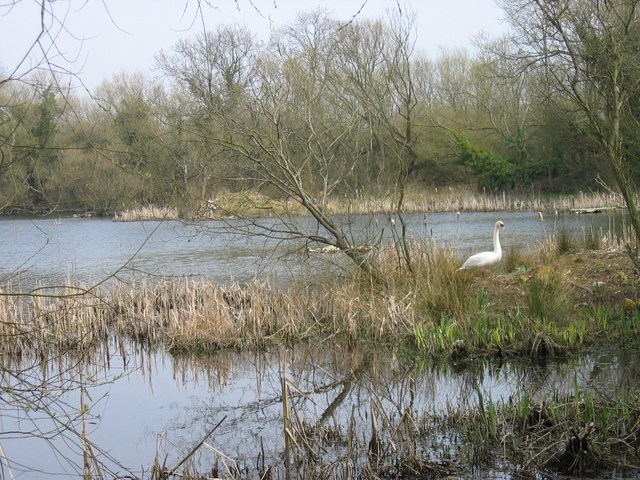
- Joe's Pond

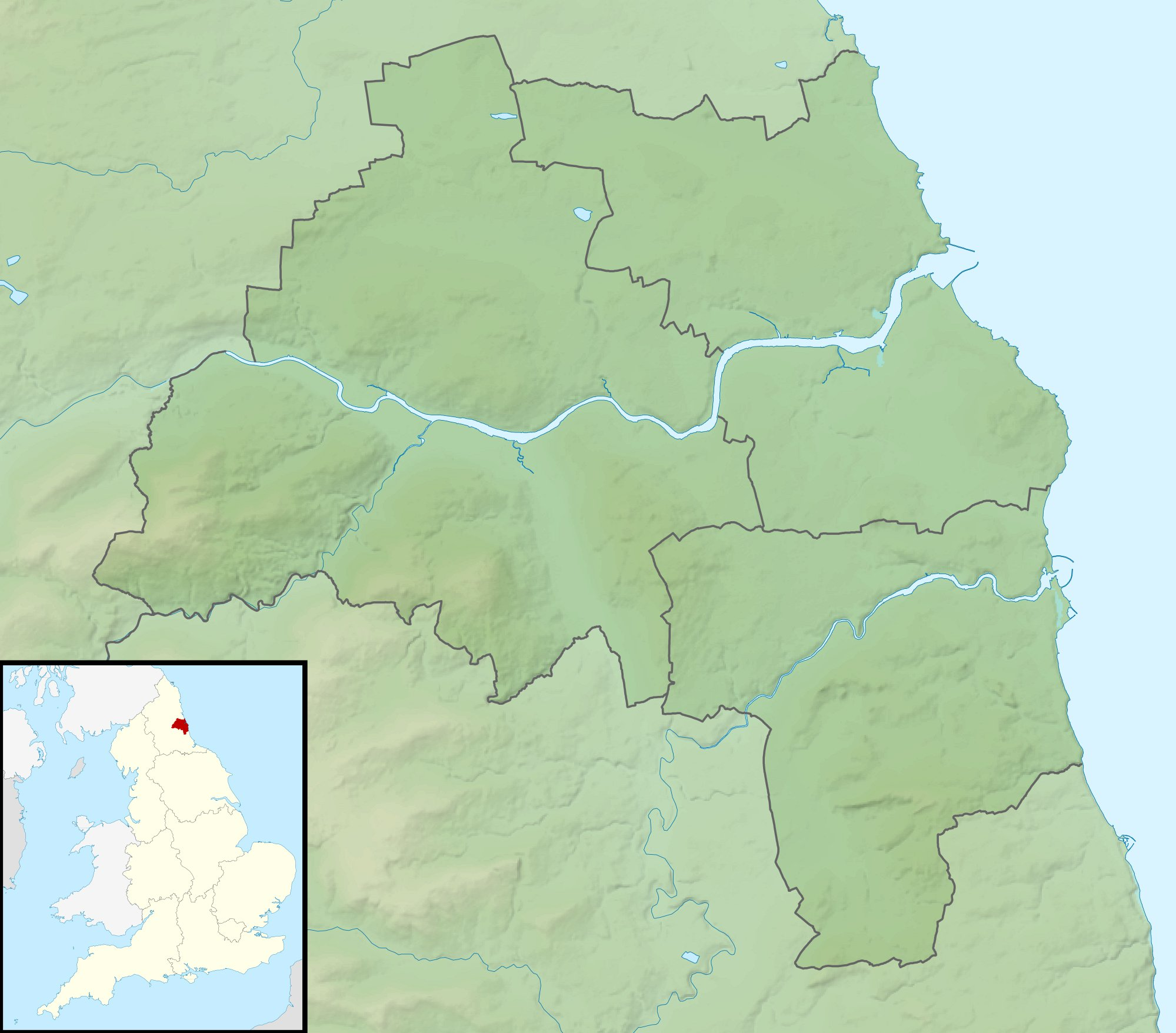
- Location within Tyne and Wear
- Location: Sunderland, Tyne and Wear, North East, England
- Coordinates: 54.8315°N 1.4900°W
- Area: 60 ha (150 acres)
- Established: 1968
- Governing body: Durham Wildlife Trust
- Website: Reserve details

Joe's Pond (formerly known as Nicholson's Pond) is a 4-hectare (9.9-acre) Site of Special Scientific Interest that lies to the east of, and adjacent to, the Rainton Meadows nature reserve in Tyne and Wear, England.

== History ==
It was originally notified, as Nicholson's Pond, in 1968. Its main feature is a deep freshwater pond, but the surrounding area contains a variety of habitats that provides shelter for over 140 species of birds and other wildlife.

The pond occupies the site of a former open-cast coal mine. It was leased in 1951 by one Joe Wilson, who began to manage it for wildlife and from whom the site derives its name. It was purchased in 1970 by the Durham Wildlife Trust, which manages it in conjunction with the adjoining Rainton Meadows nature reserve. The site actually consists of three ponds: the smallest (the "Balancing Pond") helps to prevent pollution of the main pond by trapping seepage from adjacent coal waste tips; another, slightly larger pond (the "Overflow Pond") is used to control the water level in the main pond, to which it is linked via a sluice gate.

== Location ==
The site is located to the north of East Rainton and to the south of Chilton Moor. It is easily accessed from the A690.

Joe's Pond is an excellent bird-watching site, with over 140 species to be seen, including wintering common teal, common pochard, and tufted duck, and, in summer, great crested grebes. The surrounding scrub areas host large winter flocks of thrushes and all five species of owl are regularly seen.
