= Prestwick Carr =

Wetland in Tyne and Wear, England

- Wetland
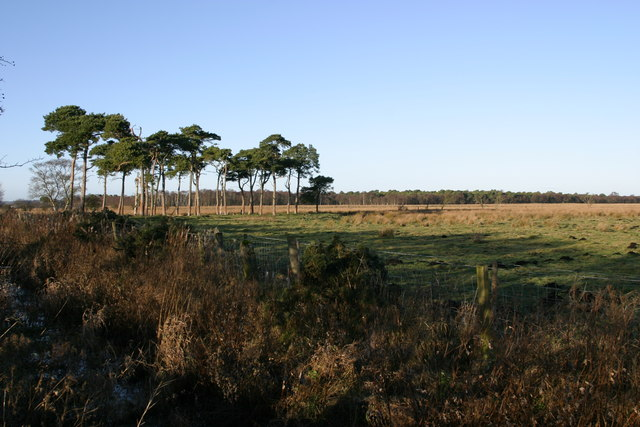
- Prestwick Carr SSSI plantation (afar)

- Location in Tyne and Wear
- Coordinates: 55.056°N 1.696°W
- Grid position: NZ195735
- Location: Tyne and Wear, England, UK

Prestwick Carr is a large area of low-lying wetland on the northern boundary of the city of Newcastle upon Tyne in northeastern England between Dinnington and Ponteland. It is known for attracting various birds of wetlands and open country and is an Site of Special Scientific Interest and a nature reserve managed by the Northumberland Wildlife Trust. A large part of the site is owned by the Ministry of Defence.

== Description and vegetation ==
Prestwick Carr sits within a low lying basin of peat to the north west of Newcastle-upon-Tyne. Within the site there are a range of wetland habitats including tall fen with soft rush and reed canary-grass, Common alder and downy birch dominated carr and a raised bog which is now surrounded by a coniferous forestry plantation. These wetlands were more extensive in the past but drainage has reduced their extent. The remaining open water supports a variety of aquatic species and the relict raised bog supports the rare bog rosemary.

== Birds ==
Prestwick Carr holds wildfowl and waders in the winter and has breeding Water rail, Eurasian skylark, willow tit and meadow pipit in summer. Barn owls and short-eared owls are also found there. In 1853 a pair of wood sandpiper were recorded as nesting at Prestwick Carr, an unusual record for England. In 2019-20 an Eastern yellow wagtail spent the winter at this site, part of an influx to Britain that winter. Other unusual records have included great grey shrike and little gull.

== Dragonflies ==
Prestwick Carr also holds dragonflies and the first records in Northumberland of four-spotted chaser and common darter were made there by early naturalists.

== Extra-parochial area ==
Prestwick Carr was an extra-parochial area, in 1891 it had a population of 0.
