= Raisby Hill Grassland =

Protected area in County Durham, England

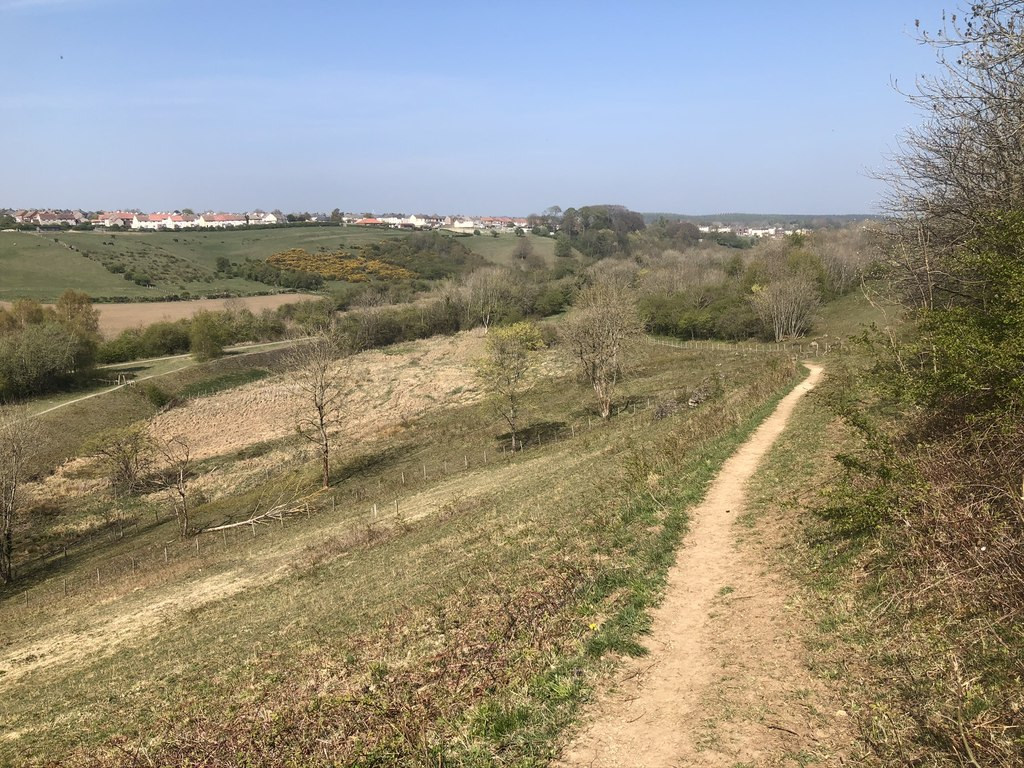
- Raisby Hill Grassland Nature Reserve

- Location within County Durham
- Location: MAGiC MaP
- Nearest city: City of Durham
- Coordinates: 54°42′47″N 1°28′51″W
- Area: 15.13 ha (37.4 acres)
- Established: 1984
- Governing body: Natural England
- Website: Raisby Hill Grassland SSSI

Raisby Hill Grassland is a Site of Special Scientific Interest in east County Durham, England. It lies 3/4 mile (1.2 km) east of the village of Coxhoe.

The site consists of a small disused quarry and the undisturbed part of Raisby Hill, as well as a small area of wetland alongside Raisby Beck. It formed part of the Raisby Hill Quarry SSSI until 1984 when it was removed and, with some expansion of the area, notified as a separate SSSI.

In the undisturbed part of Raisby Hill, primary magnesian limestone grassland is the main vegetation type. Blue moor-grass, Sesleria albicans, is abundant. There is a rich assemblage of species characteristic of calcareous soils, such as quaking grass, Briza media, meadow oat grass, Avenula pratensis, glaucous sedge, Carex flacca, and fragrant orchid, Gymnadenia conopsea.

The skeletal soils in the abandoned quarry at the southwestern end of the site support the largest population of dark-red helleborine, Epipactis atrorubens, in County Durham. Other species found here include rock rose, Helianthemum nummularium, frog orchid, Coeloglossum viride, and pyramidal orchid, Anacamptis pyramidalis.

The site supports a breeding population of Durham Argus butterfly, Aricia artaxerxes salmacis, a form only found in Durham's magnesian limestone areas.
