= Thornley Wood =

Protected area in Tyne and Wear, England

Coordinates: 54.941553°N 1.7252411°W

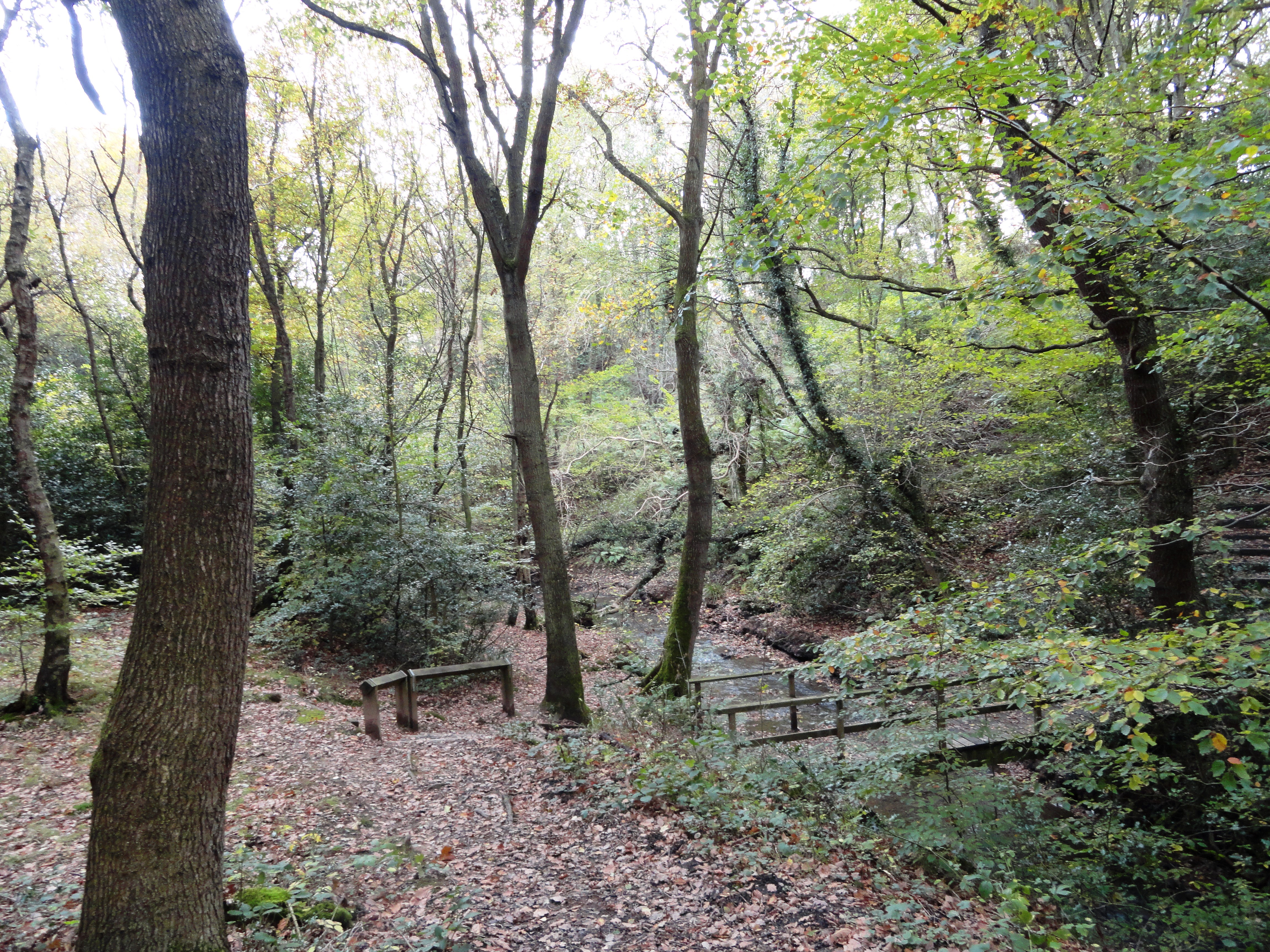
Thornley Wood

Thornley Wood is an ancient woodland and Site of Special Scientific Interest (SSSI) in Tyne and Wear, England. It is located 2.7km south of Blaydon on Tyne. This woodland is on the north side of the A694 road and is located within the valley of the River Derwent, 3.8km from its confluence with the River Tyne. This protected area neighbours Derwent Walk Country Park. The stream called Thornley Burn flows through this protected area. Thornley Woodlands Centre (on the south side of the A694 road) is 200m from this protected area. Badgers and red squirrel are present in this ancient woodland.

== Biology ==
The tree species that dominate Thornley Wood SSSI include downy birch, sessile oak and pedunculate oak. Hazel and holly is also present in this woodland. In some areas, heather, bilberry, cow-wheat and wood-sorrel are found. Fern species include male-fern and broad-buckler fern.

In wetter areas, tree species include ash, wych elm and alder. Herbaceous species in these wetter areas include woodruff, dog's mercury, ramsons, sanicle, moschatel, lesser celandine, meadowsweet, marsh hawk’s beard, wild angelica and common valerian. Fern species in these wetter areas include narrow buckler-fern and oak fern.

Insect species in Thornley Wood SSSI include the moth species Dioryctria abietella and the fly species Helina quadrinotata (genus Helina) and Stratiomys potamida.

Bird species in Thornley Wood SSSI include nuthatch, wood warbler, redstart, spotted flycatcher, pied flycatcher, great spotted woodpecker, woodcock, sparrowhawk and tawny owl.

== Land ownership ==
All land within Thornley Wood SSSI is owned by the local authority and this protected area is managed by Gateshead Metropoliton Borough Council.
