= Redcar Field =

Protected area in County Durham, England

- Location within County Durham
- Location: MAGiC MaP
- Nearest town: Darlington
- Coordinates: 54°34′23″N 1°32′57″W
- Area: 0.67 ha (1.7 acres)
- Established: 1985
- Governing body: Natural England
- Website: Redcar Field SSSI

Redcar Field is a Site of Special Scientific Interest in the Darlington district of County Durham, England. It is situated just north of Darlington, about 1 km south of the village of Coatham Mundeville.

The site, which is one of the few spring-fed areas on the magnesian limestone of County Durham, has a variety of fen vegetation types such as are not found together elsewhere in the county, including the only example of fen-meadow in the region.

The fen meadow, in which blunt-flowered rush, Juncus subnodulosus, is dominant, grades into open flushes. These are carpeted with fern-leaved hook-moss, Cratoneuron filicinum, curled hook-moss, Palustriella commutata, and pointed spear-moss, Calliergon cuspidatum, and support typical fen herbs such as marsh valerian, Valeriana dioica, and early marsh orchid, Dactylorhiza incarnata.

Another, and more extensive, fen type is tall fen, dominated by common reed, Phragmites australis, and great willow herb, Epilobium hirsutum. On the edge of the tall fen, the locally scarce meadow rue, Thalictrum flavum, is plentiful.

About one-quarter of the site is occupied by willow carr, dominated by crack willow, Salix fragilis, beneath which the field layer contains a mix of tall fen and woodland plants, the latter including wood avens, Geum rivale, male fern, Dryopteris filix-mas, and, at the edge of the carr, globe flower, Trollius europaeus.
