= Harton Down Hill =

Protected area in Tyne and Wear, England

Coordinates: 54.982581°N 1.3921356°W

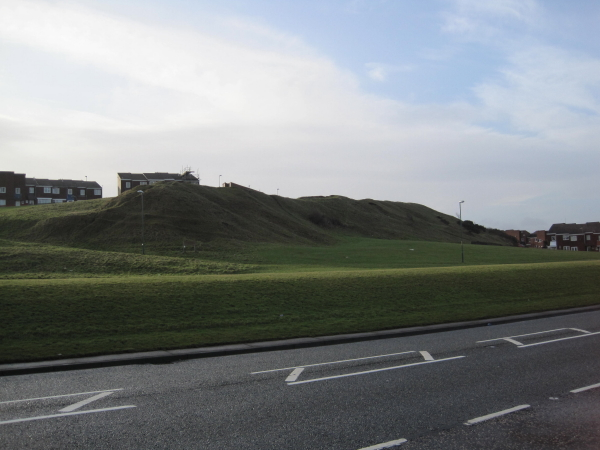
'Blackberry Hills' within Harton Down Hill SSSI

Harton Down Hill or Harton Downhill, also known locally as Blackberry Hills, is a Site of Special Scientific Interest (SSSI) in the Horsley Hill area of South Shields in the South Tyneside borough in Tyne and Wear, England. This area is protected because of the special combination of plant species that grow on the shallow soil above the Magnesian Limestone rocks here.

The land area designated as Harton Down Hill SSSI is within a larger area along Coast Road that is designated as a Local Nature Reserve called Harton Downhill.

== Biology ==
Plants in this Magnesian Limestone grassland plant community include greater knapweed, yarrow, harebell, lady's bedstraw, bird's-foot trefoil, spiny restharrow, hoary plantain, sea plantain, salad burnet, cowslip, wild thyme and devil's-bit scabious. There is also a large population of perennial flax (one of its most northernmost localities of perennial flax in Britain).

Spiny restharrow plants at Harton Down Hill have been used to understand the different ploidy levels within this plant species.

== Land ownership ==
All land within Harton Down Hill SSSI is owned by the local authority.
