= Shibdon Pond =

Protected area in Tyne and Wear, England

Coordinates: 54°57′35″N 1°41′53″W

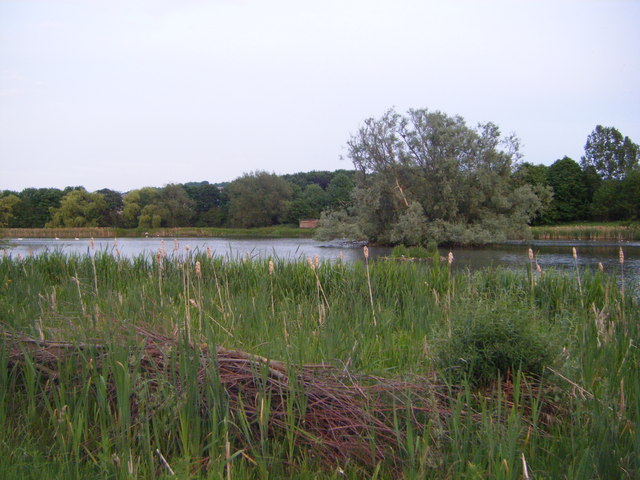
Shibdon Pond

Shibdon Pond is a Site of Special Scientific Interest (SSSI) in Tyne and Wear, England. It is located in Gateshead between Blaydon on Tyne and Dunston. It is protected for its bird life and aquatic plants.

Shibdon Pond is also designated as a Local Nature Reserve. This pond is situated close to the confluence of the River Derwent with the River Tyne.

== Biology ==
Plants in Shibdon Pond include stands of reedmace and common reed as well as the less widespread species spiked water-milfoil, fennel-leaved pondweed, water crowfoot. Plants in tall fen include reed grass, great willow-herb, water plantain, water bistort and celery-leaved crowfoot.

Grassland plants around the pond include lady's smock, yellow rattle, common spotted orchid and northern marsh orchid.

Butterflies in this protected area include large skipper, orange tip, common blue, small heath, small copper, wall brown and meadow brown.

Bird species in this protected area include tufted duck, pochard, mallard, teal, shoveler, coot, goosander and goldeneye with the population of tufted duck at this pond exceeding 300 individuals. Bird species also include little grebe, mute swan, water-rail, sedgewarbler, reedbunting and reedwarbler.

Pollen extracted from living plants at Shibdon Pond have been used to help distinguish cereal crops used during the Terminal Mesolithic period.

== History ==
Between 1837 and 1951 Blaydon Main Colliery dominated the site.

== Land ownership and management ==
All land within Shibdon Pond SSSI is owned by the local authority. Shibdon Pond is managed jointly by Gateshead Metropolitan Borough Council and Durham Wildlife Trust.
