= Hetton Bogs =

Natural area in Sunderland, UK

Coordinates: 54°49′48″N 1°27′54″W

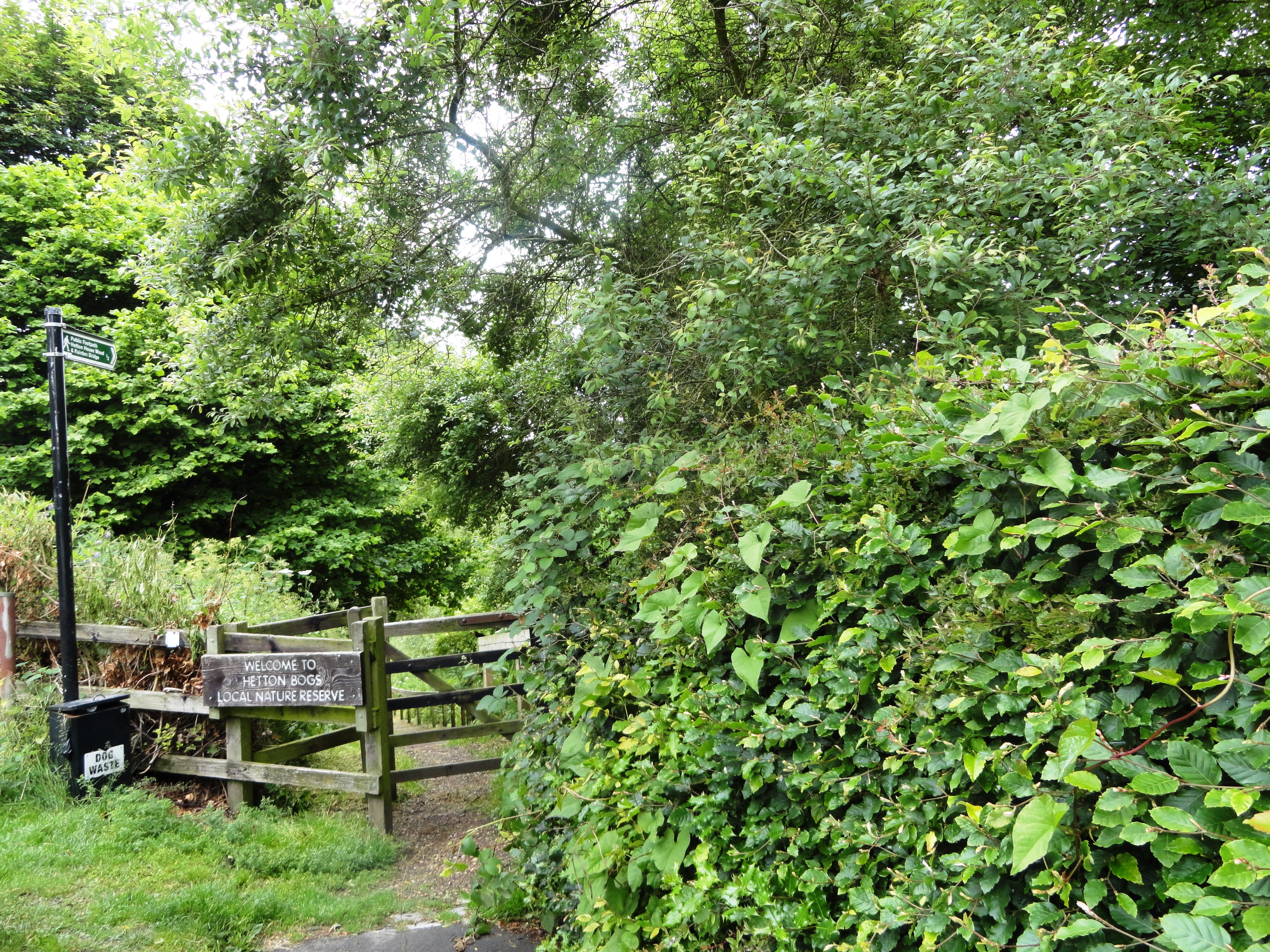
Hetton Bogs

Hetton Bogs is a Site of Special Scientific Interest (SSSI) within the Sunderland district of Tyne and Wear, England. It is located 1 km (0.62 mi) north of the town of Hetton-le-Hole. This area is protected because of the diversity of plant species present within fen habitat.

The fen habitat receives water from two streams: Hetton Burn and Rainton Burn. These provide base-rich waters from the escarpment composed of Magnesian Limestone.

== Biology ==
Plant species within the fen habitat include great hairy willow-herb, marsh willow-herb, marsh marigold, marsh thistle, square-stemmed St John's-wort, ragged robin, watermint, water forget-me-not, marsh valerian, meadowsweet, wild angelica, sneezewort, lesser spearwort, pennywort, northern marsh-orchid, spotted orchid, marsh arrowgrass, water plantain, branched bur-reed, water crowfoot and floating lesser duckweed.

In Hetton Houses Wood, under downy birch, herbaceous plants include bluebell, red campion, wood sanicle, marsh ragwort and water avens.

Water vole has been recorded within Hetton Bogs SSSI.

== Land ownership ==
All land within Hetton Bogs SSSI is owned by the local authority.
