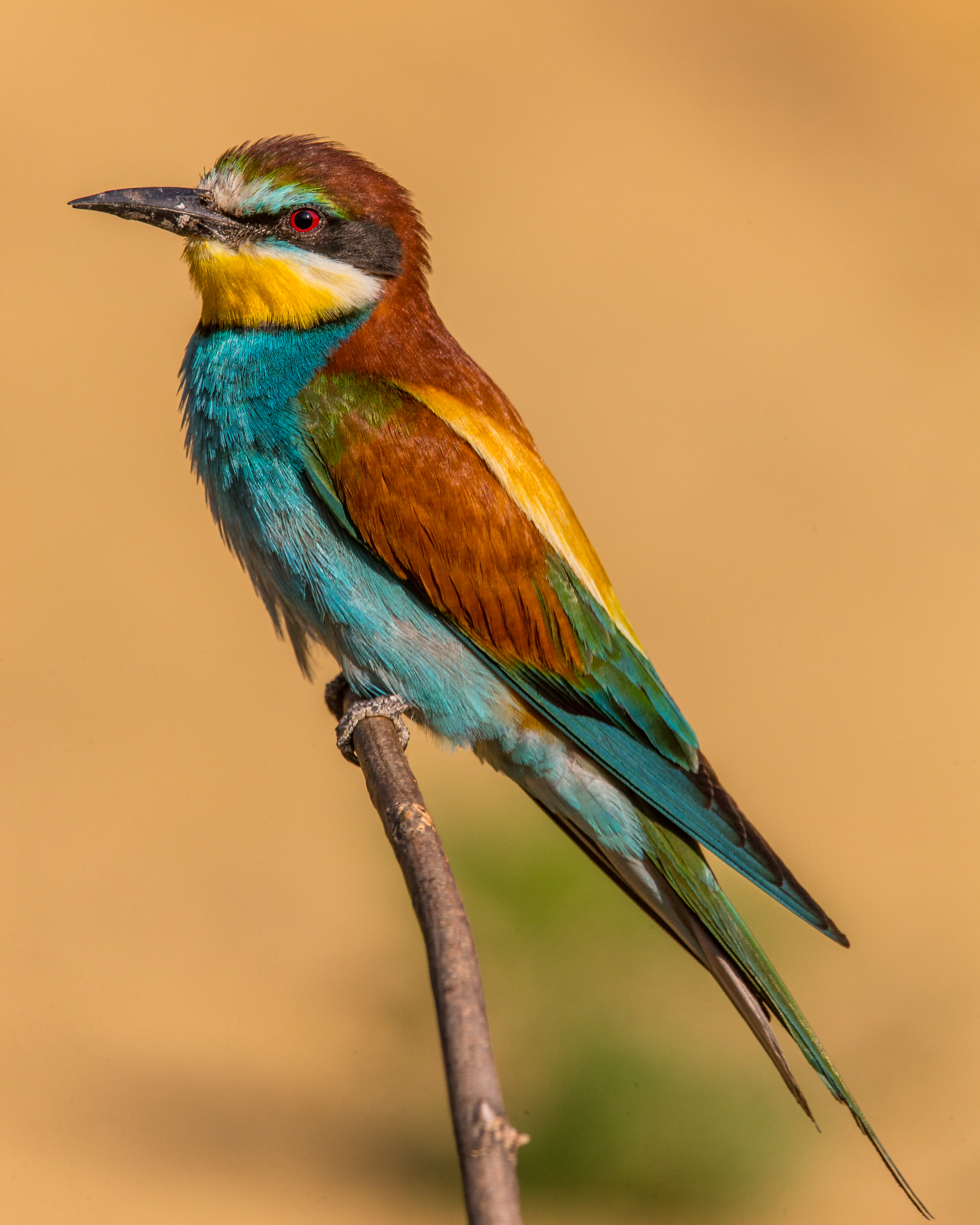

Conservation status
- Least Concern (IUCN 3.1)

Scientific classification
- Kingdom: Animalia
- Phylum: Chordata
- Class: Aves
- Order: Coraciiformes
- Family: Meropidae
- Genus: Merops
- Species: M. apiaster

Binomial name
- Merops apiaster Linnaeus, 1758
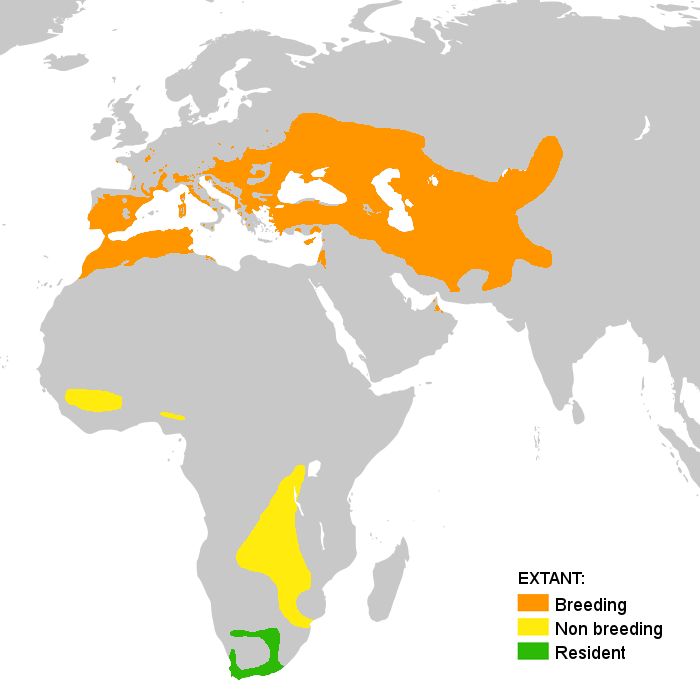
- Distribution of Merops apiaster

Audio

= European bee-eater =

Species of bird of genus Merops

The European bee-eater (Merops apiaster) is a bird species in the bee-eater family, Meropidae. It has the largest range of any bee-eater species, breeding in southern and central Europe, northern and southern Africa, and western Asia. Except for the resident southern African population, the species is strongly migratory, wintering in tropical Africa. This species occurs as a spring overshoot north of its usual range, with occasional breeding in northern Europe.

== Taxonomy and systematics ==
The European bee-eater was formally described by the Swedish naturalist Carl Linnaeus in 1758 in the tenth edition of his Systema Naturae under its current binomial name Merops apiaster. The genus name Merops (μέροψ) is Ancient Greek for "bee-eater", and apiaster is Latin, also meaning "bee-eater", from apis, "bee".

== Description ==
This species, like other bee-eaters, is a richly coloured, slender bird. It has brown and yellow upper parts, whilst the wings are green and the beak is black. It can reach a length of 27–29 cm (10.6–11.4 in), including the two elongated central tail feathers, and weigh 44–78 g (52 g on average). Sexes are alike. Female tends to have greener rather than gold feathers on shoulders. Non-breeding plumage is much duller and with a blue-green back and no elongated central tail feathers. Juvenile resembles a non-breeding adult, but with less variation in the feather colours. Adults begin to moult in June or July and complete the process by August or September. There is a further moult into breeding plumage in winter in Africa.

== Behaviour and ecology ==
=== Breeding ===
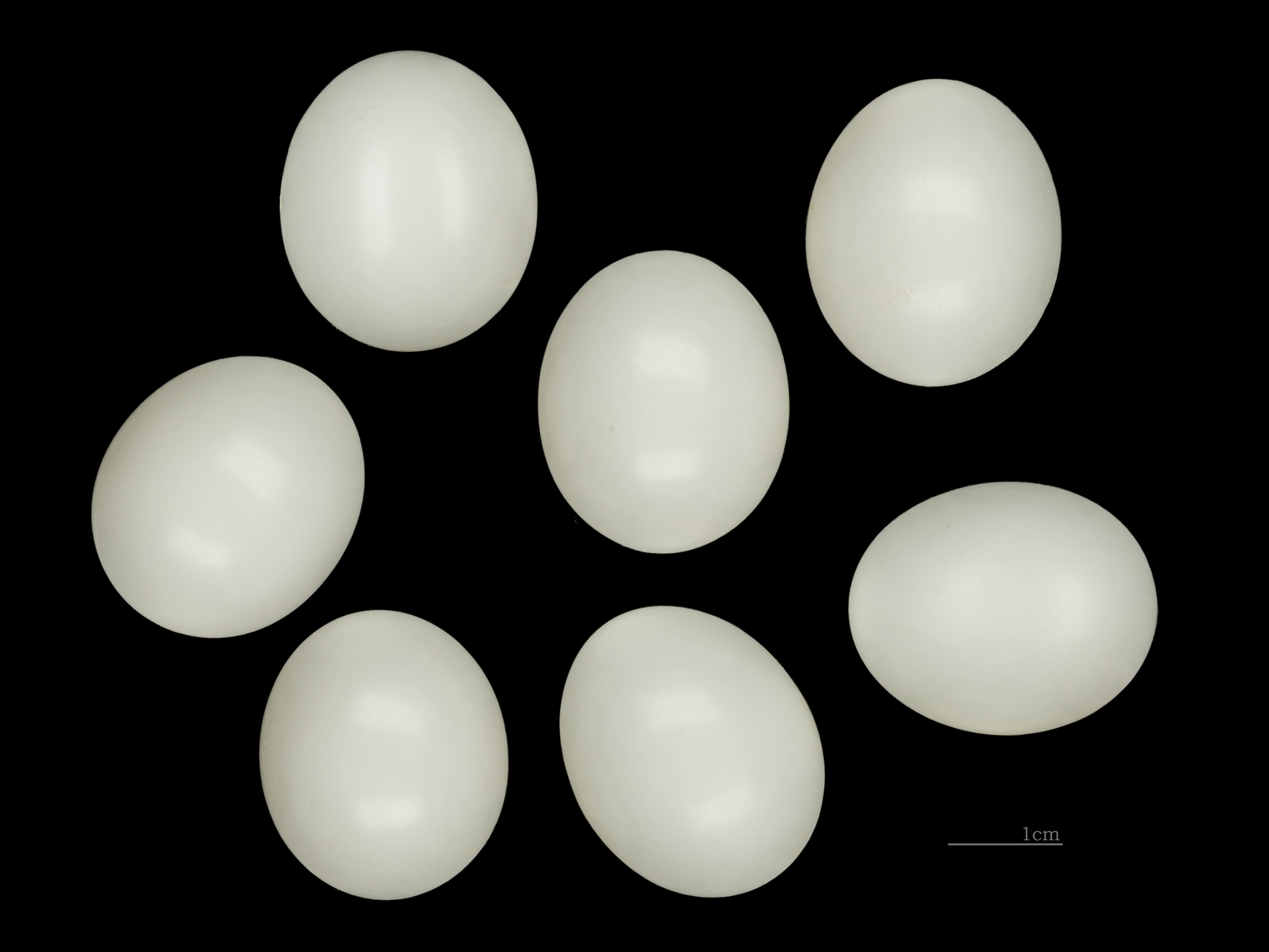
Eggs of Merops apiaster

These bee-eaters are gregarious, nesting colonially in sandy banks, preferably near river shores, usually at the beginning of May. They make a relatively long tunnel, in which they lay five to eight spherical white eggs around the beginning of June. Both male and female care for the eggs, which they brood for about three weeks. They also feed and roost communally.

During courtship, the male feeds large items to the female while eating the small ones himself. Most males are monogamous, but occasional bigamy has been encountered. Their typical call is a distinctive, mellow, liquid and burry prreee or prruup.

=== Feeding ===
This bird breeds in open country in warmer climates. As the name suggests, bee-eaters predominantly eat insects, especially bees, wasps, and hornets. They catch insects in flight, in sorties from an open perch. Before eating a bee, the European bee-eater removes the sting by repeatedly hitting the insect on a hard surface. It can eat around 250 bees a day.

The most important prey item in their diet is Hymenoptera, mostly the European honey bee. A study in Spain found that these comprise 69.4% to 82% of the European bee-eaters' diet. Their impact on bee populations, however, is small. They eat less than 1% of the worker bees in areas where they live.

A study found that European bee-eaters "convert food to body weight more efficiently if they are fed a mixture of bees and dragonflies than if they eat only bees or only dragonflies."

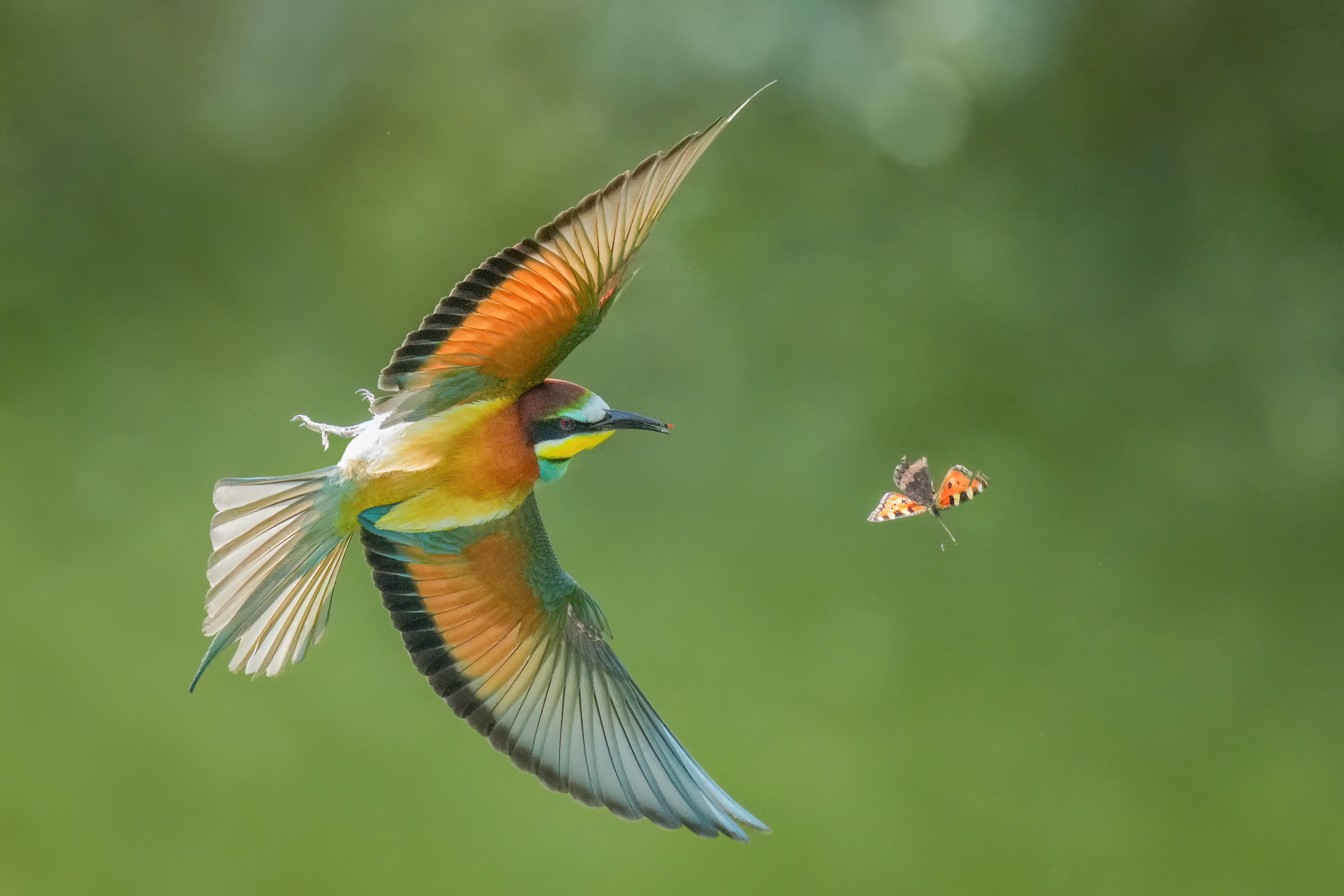
European bee-eater chasing a small tortoiseshell butterfly in flight

Feeding bee-eater—the female (in front) waits for the male's offering

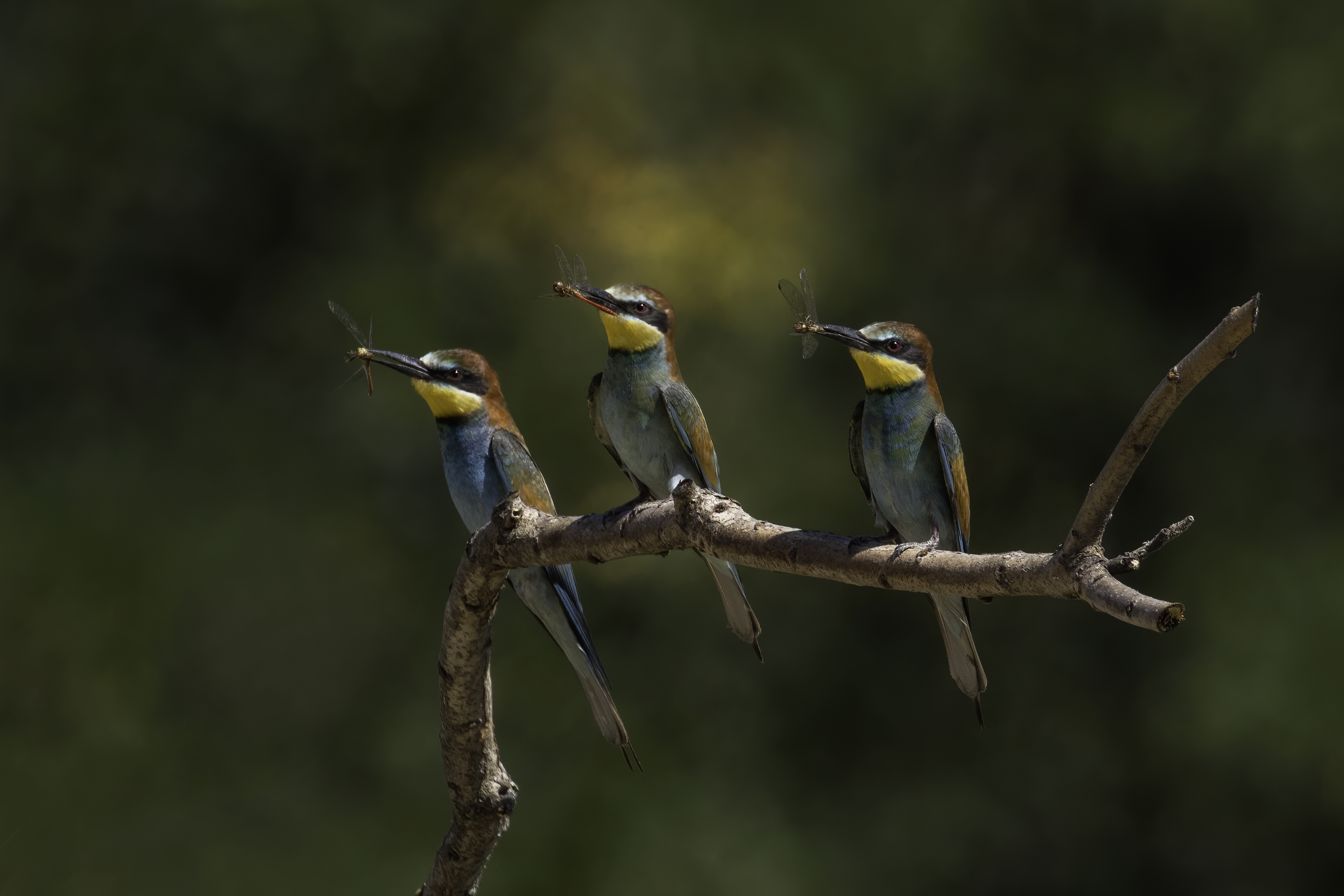
Each with a dragonfly

=== Predation of honey bees ===
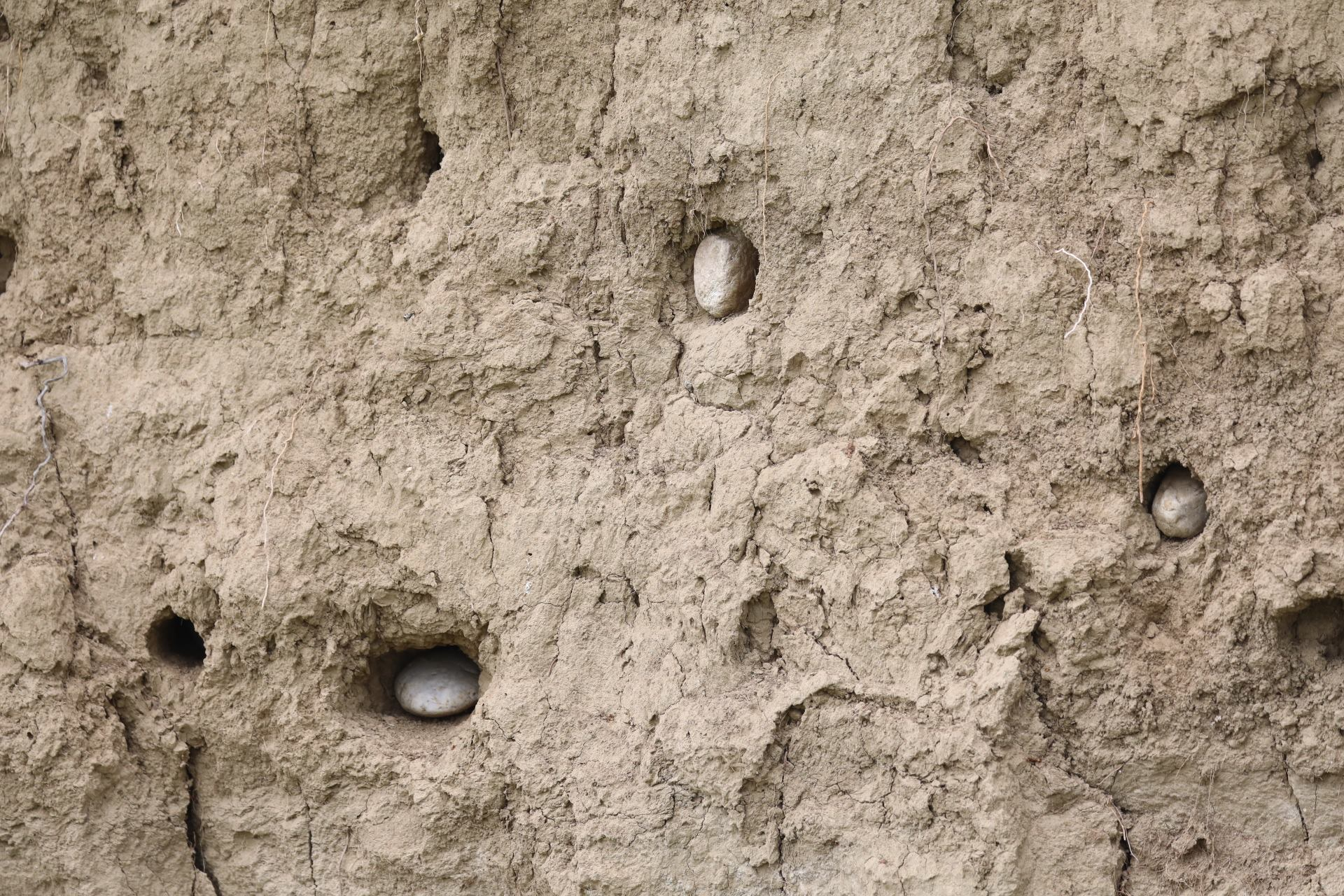
Bee-eater colony destroyed by beekeepers. The entrance into the bee-eater's galleries was deliberately blocked with stones

If an apiary is set up close to a bee-eater colony, a larger number of honey bees are eaten because they are more abundant. However, studies show the bee-eaters do not intentionally fly into the apiary, rather they feed on the insects caught on pastures and meadows within a radius of 12 km (7.5 mi) from the colony, this maximum distance being reached only when there is a lack of food. Observations show that the birds actually enter the apiary only in cold and rainy periods, when the bees do not leave the hive and other insect prey are harder for the bee-eaters to detect.

Many bee-keepers believe that the bee-eaters are the main obstacle causing worker bees not to forage, and instead stay inside the hives for much of the day between May and the end of August. However, a study carried out in eucalyptus forest in the Alalous region, 80 km (50 mi) east of Tripoli, Libya, showed that the bee-eaters were not the main obstacle of bee foraging, which is the opposite of what beekeepers think. The foraging rate was higher in presence of the birds than in their absence in some cases. The average bird meal consisted of 90.8% honey bees and 9.2% beetles.

Predation is more likely when the bees are queening or during peak migrations, from late March till mid-April, and in mid-September. Hives close to or under trees or overhead cables are also at increased risk as the birds pounce on flying insects from these perches.

In order to keep bee-eaters at bay, some apiarists utilize falcon kite scarecrows (fake falcons), since bee-eaters are frightened of falcons, predators of bee-eaters. Another preventive measure is a bioacoustic bird repeller, which releases the sound of different birds of prey which are predators of the bee-eater.

== In culture ==
With the help of a Motifs Advisory Group, the Governing Council of the European Central Bank selected a "bee-eater colony in a sand wall on the side of a large, confined river valley along a riverbank" as a potential front motif for the 2020s redesign of the 20€ banknote, with the reverse featuring the building of the European Central Bank.

== Gallery ==
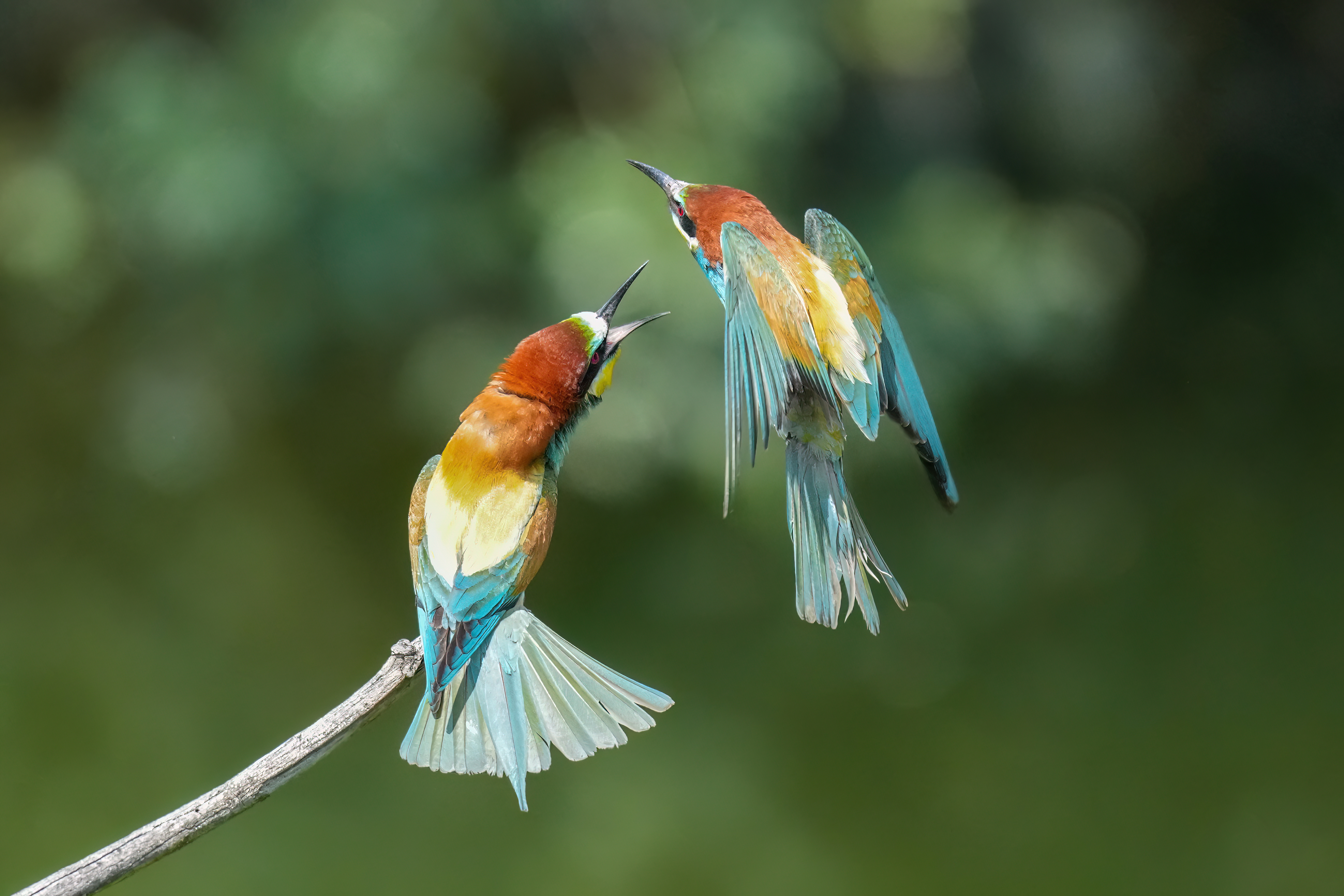
European bee-eater attacking another european bee-eater

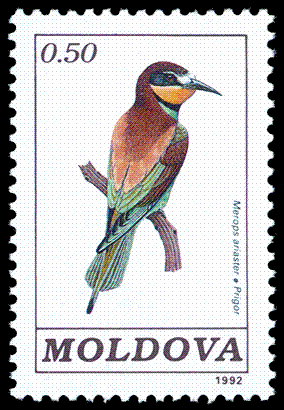
Stamp of Moldova -European bee-eater

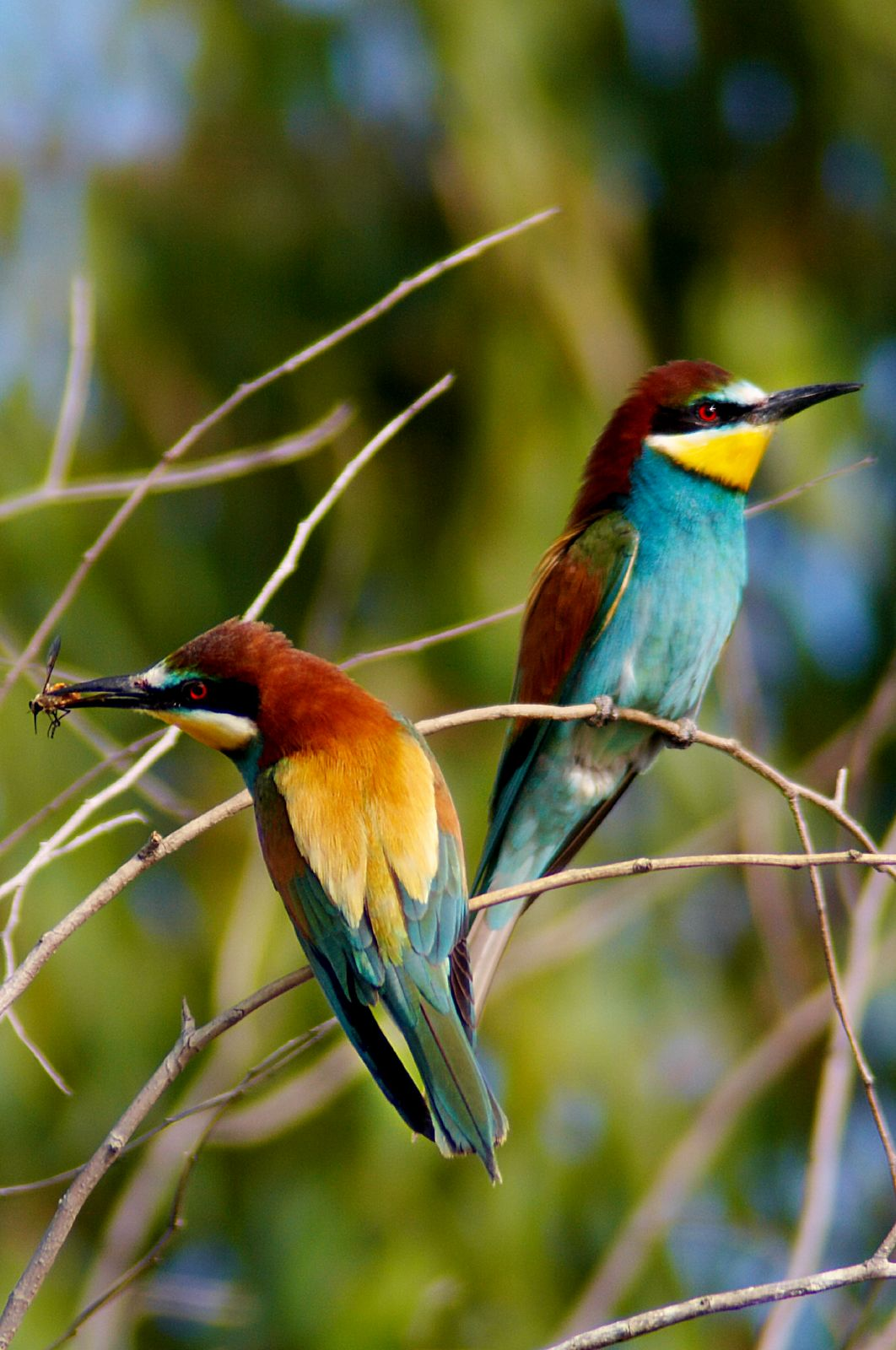

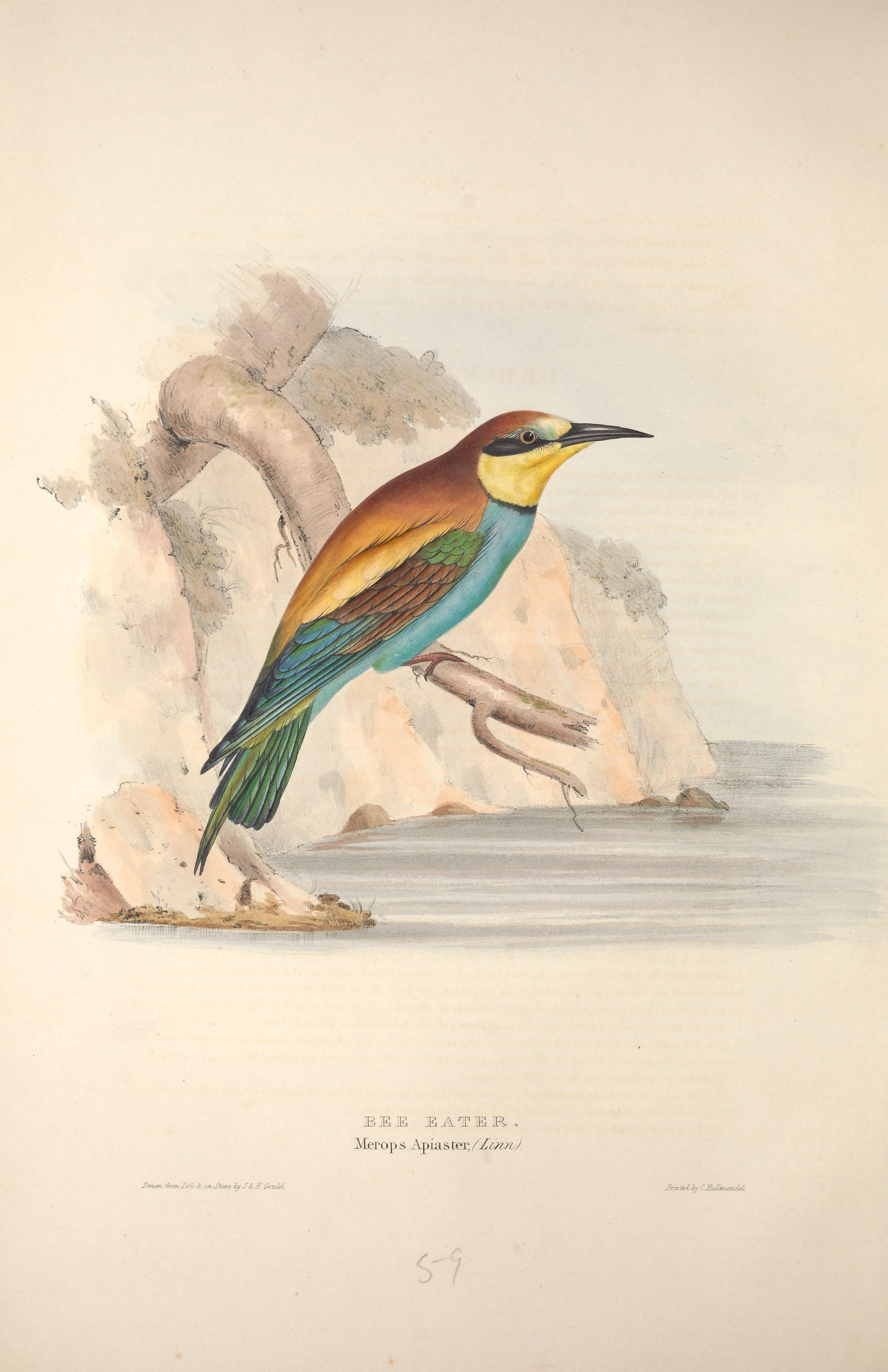
European bee-eater painted by John Gould, English ornithologist

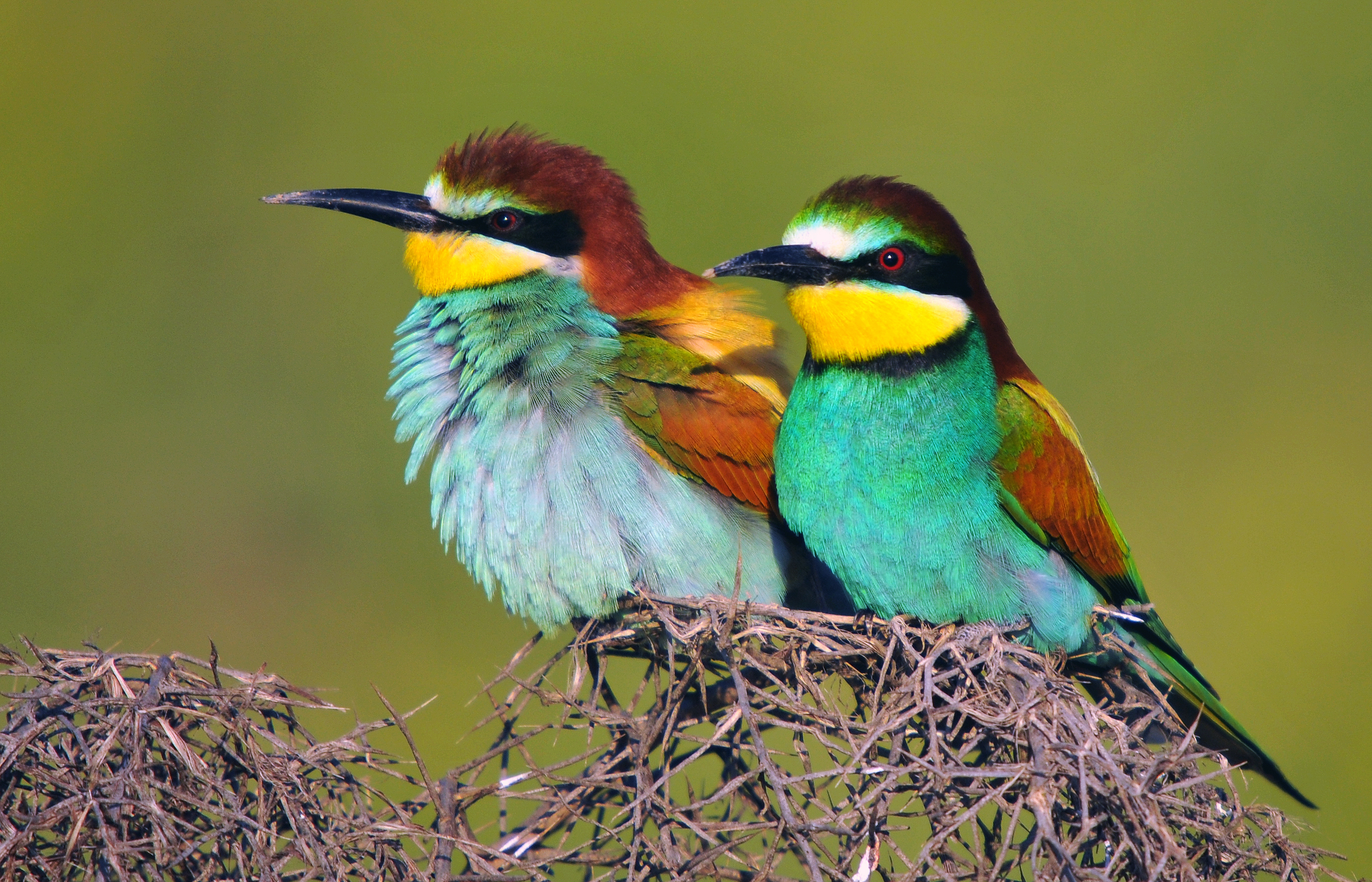
A pair of Turkish bee-eaters

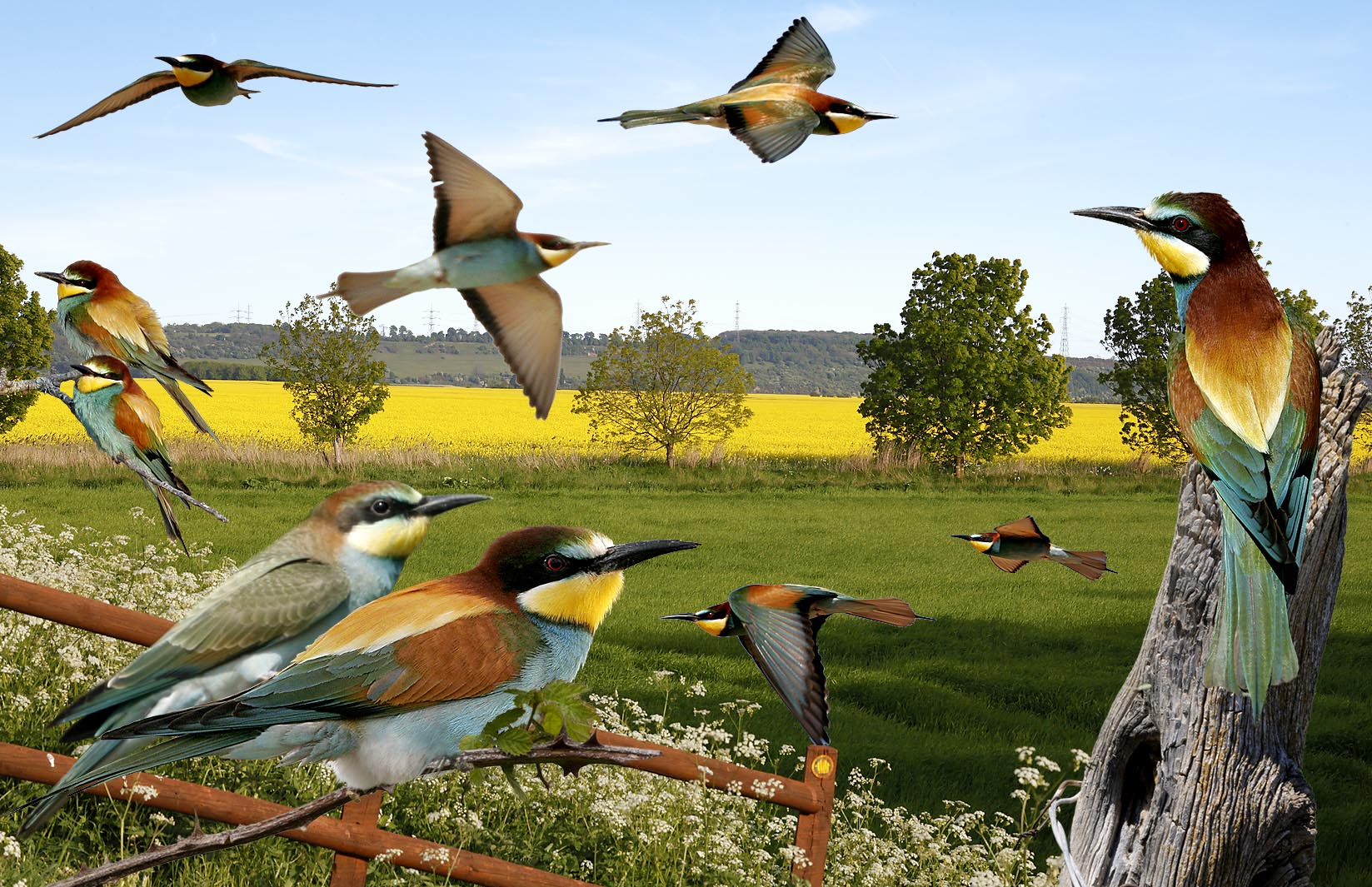
ID composite

Close-up video of a female European bee-eater

== See also ==
- Bee-eaters in Britain
