= North American Dryopteris hybrid complex =

North American Dryopteris reticulate complex

Hybridization and polyploidy are common phenomena in ferns, and the genus Dryopteris is known to be one of the most freely-hybridizing fern genera. North American botanists recognized early that there were close relationships between many of the species of Dryopteris on the continent, and that these relationships reflected hybrid ancestry. The complex includes six sexual diploid parents (one of which, "D. semicristata", is hypothesized to be extinct), six sexual allopolyploids, and numerous sterile hybrids at various ploidal levels.

== Diploid species ==
- Dryopteris intermedia
- Dryopteris expansa
- Dryopteris goldieana
- Dryopteris ludoviciana
- Dryopteris marginalis
- Dryopteris "semicristata"

== Allopolyploid species ==
- Dryopteris carthusiana (D. intermedia × "D. semicristata"; allotetraploid)
- Dryopteris campyloptera (D. intermedia × D. expansa; allotetraploid)
- Dryopteris celsa (D. goldieana × D. ludoviciana; allotetraploid)
- Dryopteris clintoniana (D. cristata × D. goldieana; allohexaploid)
- Dryopteris cristata (D. ludovicana × "D. semicristata"; allotetraploid)
- Dryopteris filix-mas (progenitors D. caucasica and D. oreades)

== Other hybrids ==
- Dryopteris × australis (D. celsa × D. ludoviciana; triploid)
- Dryopteris × bootii (D. cristata × D. intermedia; triploid)
- Dryopteris × critica (D. borreri × D. filix-mas)
- Dryopteris × complexa aggregate (D. filix-mas and D. affinis; tetraploid)
- Dryopteris × convoluta (D. cambrensis × D. filix-mas)
- Dryopteris × deweveri (D. dilatata × D. carthusiana)
- Dryopteris × neo-wherryi (D. goldieana × D. marginalis; diploid)
- Dryopteris × triploidea (D. carthusiana × D. intermedia; triploid)
