= Filicin =

Names
- IUPAC name 2-Butanoyl-4-[[3-butanoyl-5-[(5-butanoyl-2,6-dihydroxy-3,3-dimethyl-4-oxocyclohexa-1,5-dien-1-yl)methyl]-2,4,6-trihydroxyphenyl]methyl]-3,5-dihydroxy-6,6-dimethylcyclohexa-2,4-dien-1-one
- Other names Filixic acid BBB; Filixic acid

Identifiers
CAS Number	4482-83-1
3D model (JSmol)	Interactive image
ChEBI	CHEBI:5060
ChemSpider	170653
ECHA InfoCard	100.022.516
EC Number	224-766-2
KEGG	C10693
PubChem CID	197044
UNII	3OQ8CMM2OZ
CompTox Dashboard (EPA)	DTXSID001101435
- InChI: InChI=1S/C36H44O12/c1-8-11-20(37)23-27(41)16(14-18-29(43)24(21(38)12-9-2)33(47)35(4,5)31(18)45)26(40)17(28(23)42)15-19-30(44)25(22(39)13-10-3)34(48)36(6,7)32(19)46/h40-46H,8-15H2,1-7H3 Key: FRTCWDLFHSMTNW-UHFFFAOYSA-N
- SMILES: CCCC(=O)C1=C(C(=C(C(=C1O)CC2=C(C(C(=O)C(=C2O)C(=O)CCC)(C)C)O)O)CC3=C(C(C(=O)C(=C3O)C(=O)CCC)(C)C)O)O

Properties
Chemical formula	C_{36}H_{44}O_{12}
Molar mass	668.736 g·mol^{−1}
- Except where otherwise noted, data are given for materials in their standard state (at 25 °C [77 °F], 100 kPa). Infobox references

Filicin is a chemical compound that has been isolated from ferns of the genus Dryopteris. It has been isolated from the male fern (Dryopteris filix-mas). Filicin has been studied for its anthelmintic activity.

== Related compounds ==
A variety of chemically related compounds, sometimes referred to collectively as filicins, have also been isolated from ferns. Chemical analysis of filicins in fern extracts can assist in determining taxonomy. Examples of filicins include:

Name(s)	Chemical structure	Molecular formula	Molecular weight (g/mol)	CAS number	PubChem	Notes and references
Filixic acid ABA		C_{32}H_{36}O_{12}	612.63	38226-84-5	CID 15081408 from PubChem	First isolated from Dryopteris dickinsii
Filixic acid ABP		C_{33}H_{38}O_{12}	626.66	57765-54-5	CID 73672225 from PubChem	
Filixic acid ABB		C_{34}H_{40}O_{12}	640.68	37318-24-4	CID 102574620 from PubChem	Found in Dryopteris sieboldii
Filixic acid PBP		C_{34}H_{40}O_{12}	640.68	51005-85-7	CID 20055092 from PubChem	Found in Dryopteris sieboldii and Dryopteris filix-mas
Filixic acid PBB		C_{35}H_{42}O_{12}	654.71	49582-09-4	CID 20055091 from PubChem	
Flavaspidic acid BB; Toxifren; Polystichocitrin; Glavaspidic acid		C_{24}H_{30}O_{8}	446.49	114-42-1	CID 8237 from PubChem	Isolated from Dryopteris abbreviata
