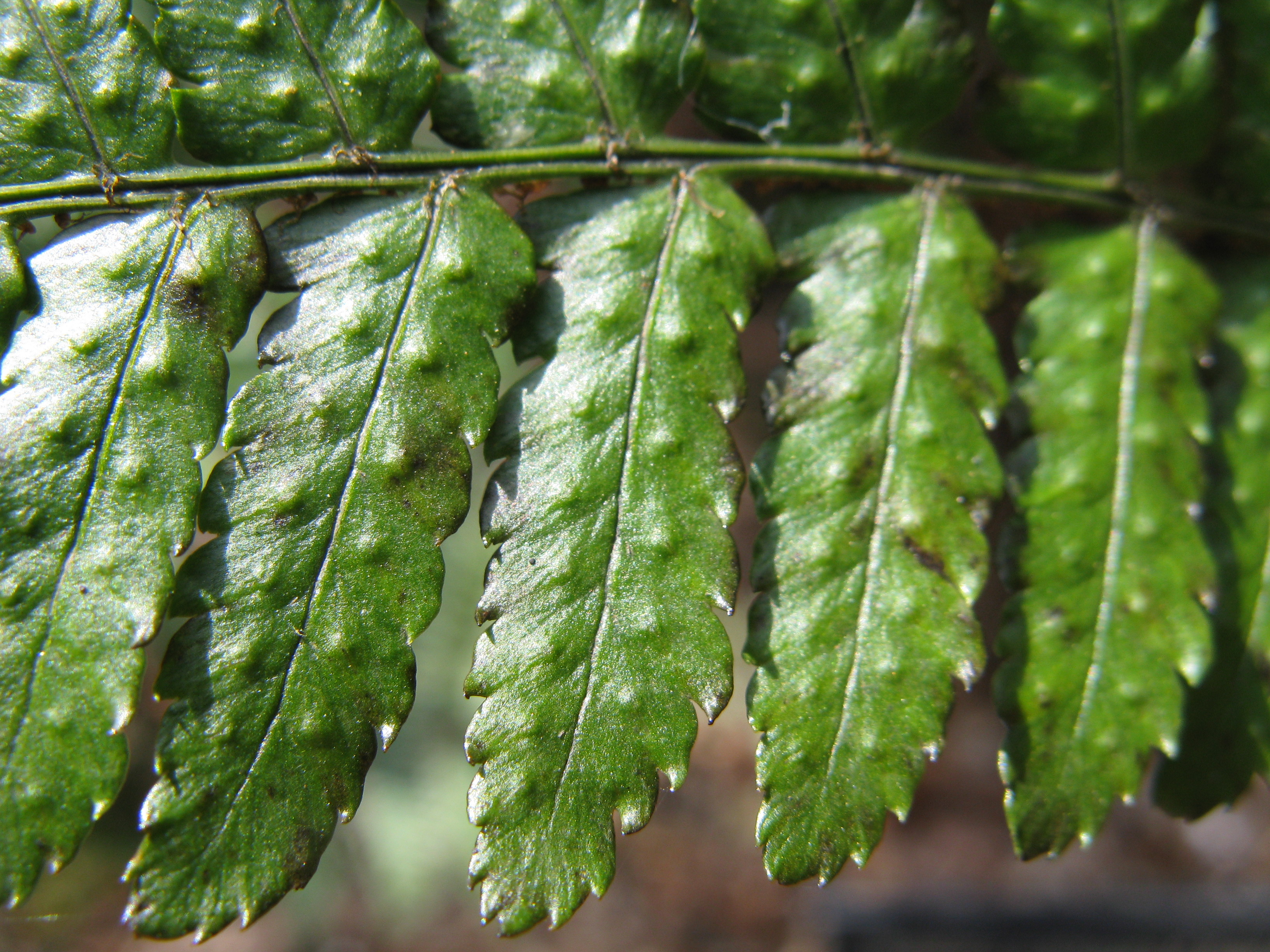
- D. erythrosora pinnules

Scientific classification
- Kingdom: Plantae
- Clade: Tracheophytes
- Division: Polypodiophyta
- Class: Polypodiopsida
- Order: Polypodiales
- Suborder: Polypodiineae
- Family: Dryopteridaceae
- Genus: Dryopteris
- Species: D. erythrosora

Binomial name
- Dryopteris erythrosora (D.C.Eaton) Kuntze

Synonyms
- 18 Synonyms: Aspidium erythrosorum D.C.Eaton (1856); Aspidium prolificum Maxim. ex Franch. & Sav. (1877); Lastrea erythrosora (D.C.Eaton) T.Moore (1858); Lastrea prolifica T.Moore (1882); Dryopteris bulligera Ching (1938); D. distantipinna Ching & Z.Y.Liu (1984); D. erythrosora f. viridisora (Nakai ex H.Itô) H.Itô (1939); D. erythrosora var. viridisora Nakai ex H.Itô (1936); D. linyingensis Ching & C.F.Zhang (1983); D. oblongipinnula Ching & P.C.Chiu (1987); D. oppositipinna Ching & Z.Y.Liu (1984); D. pseudoerythrosora Ching & C.F.Zhang(1983); D. remotipinnula Ching & C.F.Zhang (1983); D. sinoerythrosora Ching & K.H.Shing (1982); D. squamistipes Ching & Z.Y.Liu (1984); Nephrodium erythrosorum (D.C.Eaton) Hook. (1862); Nephrodium prolificum Diels (1899); Nephrodium prolificum G.Nicholson (1888)

= Dryopteris erythrosora =

Species of fern

Dryopteris erythrosora, the autumn fern or Japanese shield fern, is a species of fern in the family Dryopteridaceae, native to China South-Central, China Southeast, Japan, Korea, Nansei-shoto and Taiwan.

== Etymology ==
The specific epithet, erythrosora, is derived from two Ancient Greek words, ἐρυθρός (eruthrós) meaning red, and σωρός (sōrós) meaning heap. So erythrosora literally means red heap, referring to the red sori on the undersides of the pinnules. The specific epithet may really be a reference to the red indusia, which cover the sori.

The common name, "autumn fern", refers to the coppery-red colour of the emerging fronds, which, even in spring, gives the fern an autumnal appearance.

== Description ==
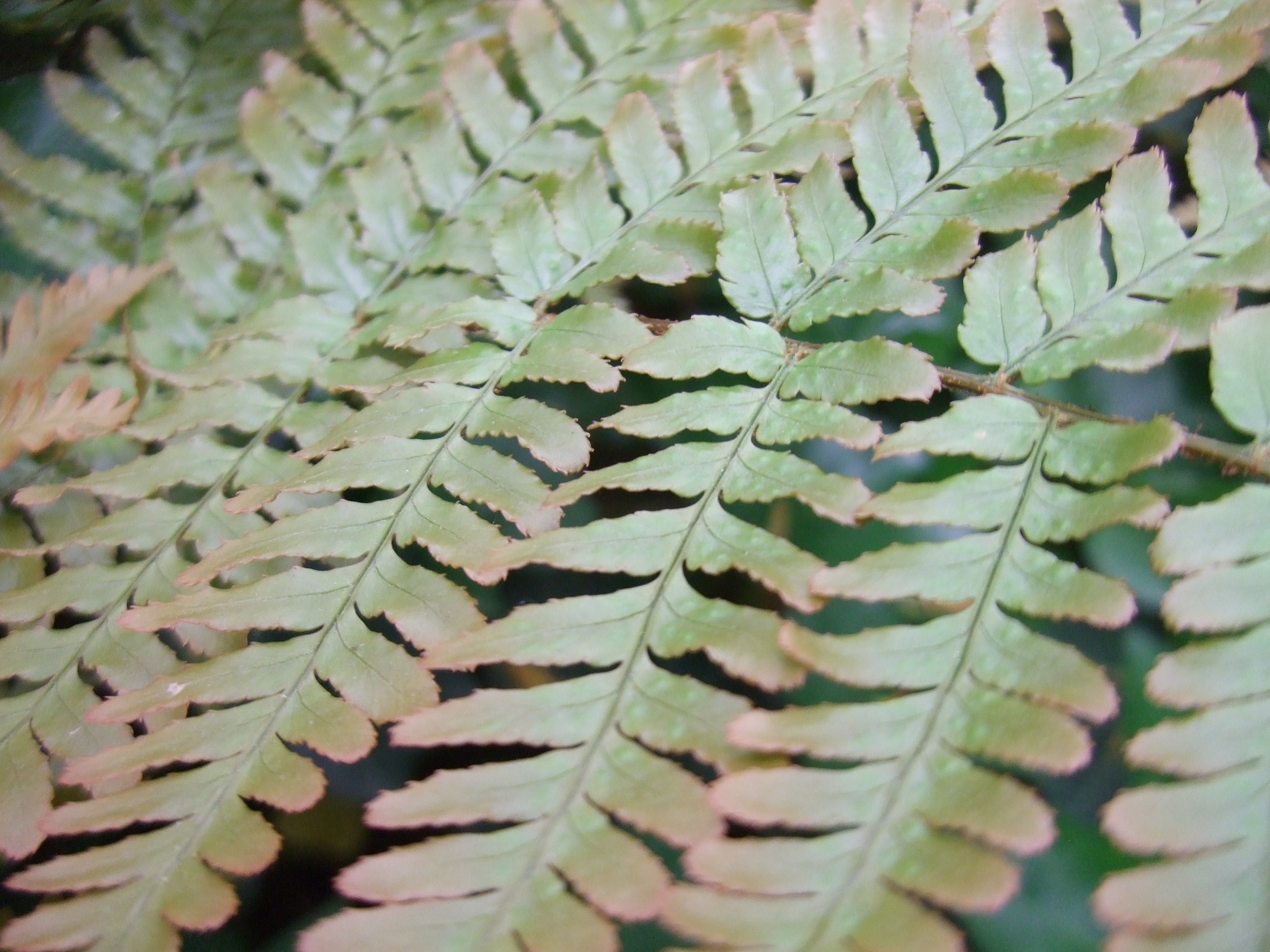
D. erythrosora 'Brilliance'

It is semi-evergreen (in cooler climates), with bipinnate fronds 30–70 cm (12–28 in) tall by 15–35 cm (6–14 in) broad, with 8–20 pairs of pinnae. The fronds have a coppery tint when young, but mature to dark green. It has an upright to down-lying rhizome which is thick and branched, so that it forms several crowns.

The leaves are funnel-shaped with the top ones being leathery shiny, divided twice, triangular in shape and pointy. The individual leaflets are narrow lanceolate. Its edge is almost completely sown up.

The leaf stalks are about a third as long as the leaf, striated, yellow to red, with linear to lancet-shaped brown scales, containing two large and several small vascular bundles in a cross-sectional drawing.

When budding, the young fronds are coppery red and later green. There can also be several leaf outlets per year. The spores, which are kidney-shaped, become ripe between summer and autumn.

== Cultivation ==
Dryopteris erythrosora can tolerate a drier soil than many ferns, but is most successful in moist, humus-rich soil, with a pH range of 6.1 to 7.5, with morning or late afternoon sunshine but not during the middle of the day. It is hardy zones 5 to 11. Propagation is by division in spring, separating the small crowns from the larger crowns, or by spores. It is raised as an ornamental plant in gardens because of its color change in the foliage, which change from dark red to dark green, but not very often.

D. erythrosora and the cultivar D. erythrosora 'Brilliance' have gained the Royal Horticultural Society's Award of Garden Merit.
