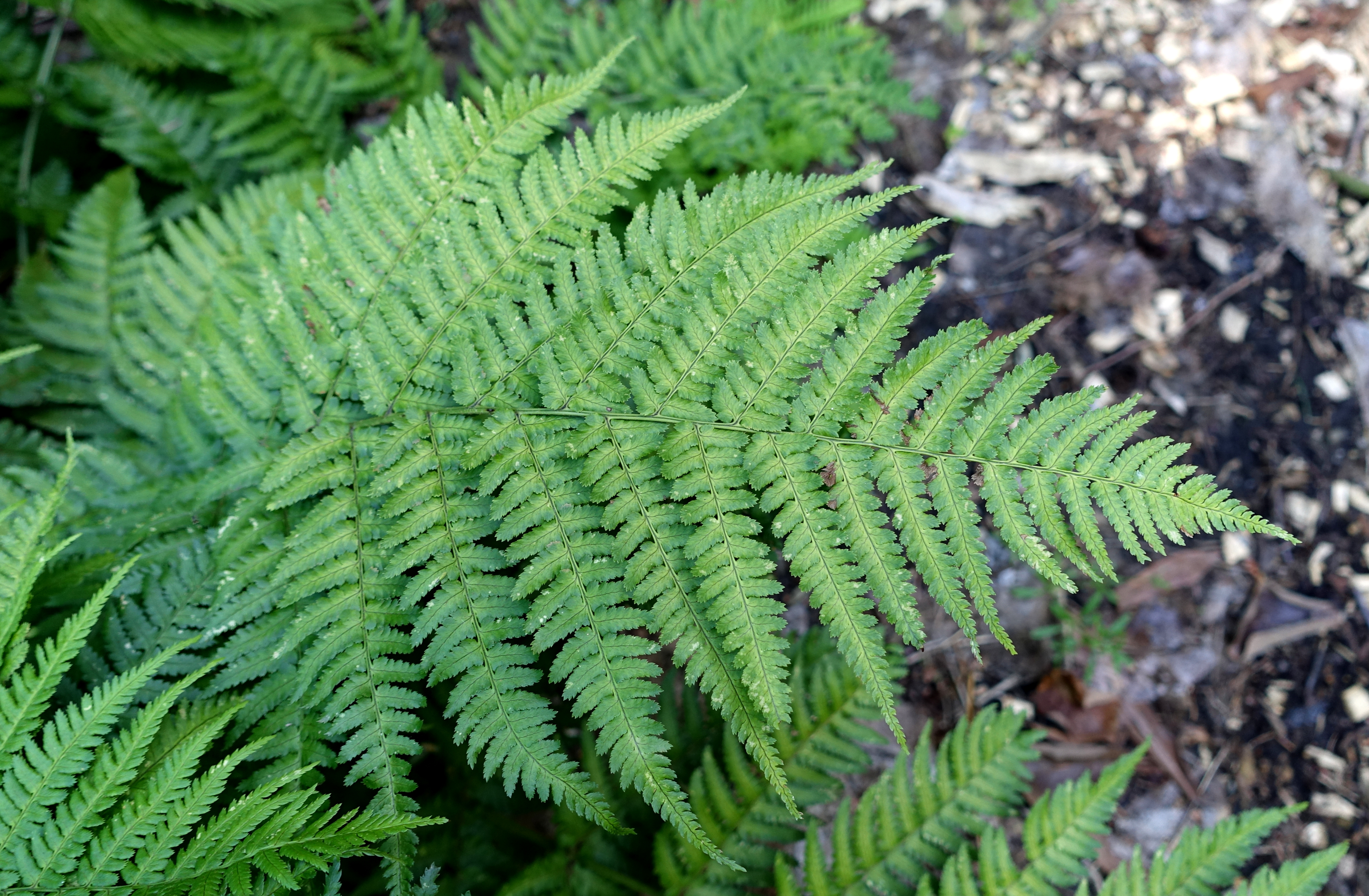

Scientific classification
- Kingdom: Plantae
- Clade: Tracheophytes
- Division: Polypodiophyta
- Class: Polypodiopsida
- Order: Polypodiales
- Suborder: Polypodiineae
- Family: Dryopteridaceae
- Genus: Dryopteris
- Species: D. nigropaleacea

Binomial name
- Dryopteris nigropaleacea (Fraser-Jenk.) Fraser-Jenk.

= Dryopteris nigropaleacea =

Species of fern

Dryopteris nigropaleacea is a species of perennial leptosporangiate fern endemic to parts of Afghanistan, Pakistan, western Nepal, and Himachal Pradesh and Uttar Pradesh in India.

== Synonyms ==
- Dryopteris juxtaposita subsp. nigropaleacea (Fraser-Jenk.) Khullar
- Dryopteris pallida subsp. nigropaleacea Fraser-Jenk.
