= Dryopteris pallida =

Scientific classification
- Kingdom: Plantae
- Clade: Tracheophytes
- Division: Polypodiophyta
- Class: Polypodiopsida
- Order: Polypodiales
- Suborder: Polypodiineae
- Family: Dryopteridaceae
- Genus: Dryopteris
- Species: D. pallida

Binomial name
- Dryopteris pallida (Bory) Maire & Petitm.

Species of fern plant

Dryopteris pallida is a species of fern.

== Description ==
Dryopteris pallida is a winter-green Dryopteris fern of small to moderate size with very pale broad chaffy scales on the long somewhat pale stem and leaves that are often rather a pallid green; glands may be present.

The fronds are two-fold divided (2-pinnate), with the final leaflets (pinnules) usually being obviously stalked and also conspicuously lobed (sometimes almost further dividing the leaflet to 3-pinnate). The frond divisions are not greatly asymmetric so that the first divisions (pinna) closest to the ground have a lower part somewhat similar to the upper and subdivisions similar to adjacent ones.

The fertile sori under the leaflets are round with an incompletely rounded covering (reniform or kidney-shaped indusium), and are arranged as two lines, one on each side of the leaflet axis.

Its habitat is alkaline to acidic, 0–3000 m, in woods, scrubs and slopes, typically avoiding dry ground.

== Subspecies and range ==
- subsp. pallida - Albania, Algeria, Balearic Islands, Corsica, Cyprus, Greece, Iran, Italy, Crete, Lebanon-Syria, Palestine, Sardinia, Sicily, Transcaucasus, Tunisia, Turkey, Yugoslavia.
- subsp. balearica (Litard.) Fraser-Jenk. - frond only to 25 cm with a deltate shape and stalk more than 50% – Balearic Islands.
- subsp. libanotica (Rosenst.) E.Nardi - Cyprus, Lebanon-Syria, Palestine, Turkey.
- subsp. raddeana (Fomin) E.Nardi - Iran, Transcaucasus.

Resimli Türkiye Florası differs from Plants of the World in placing the Turkish plants as subsp. raddeana.
