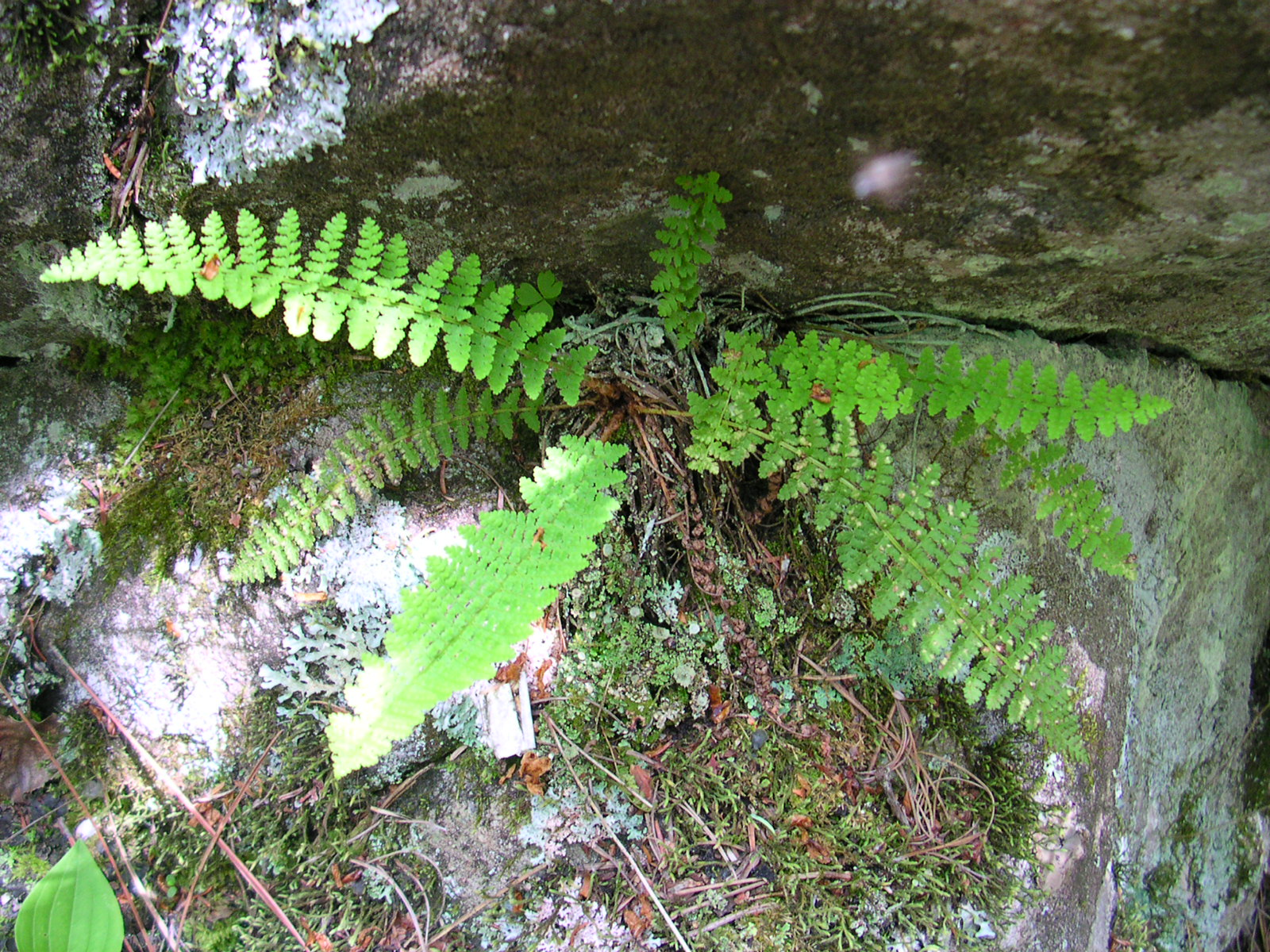
- Fragrant fern (Dryopteris fragrans)

Scientific classification
- Kingdom: Plantae
- Clade: Tracheophytes
- Division: Polypodiophyta
- Class: Polypodiopsida
- Order: Polypodiales
- Suborder: Polypodiineae
- Family: Dryopteridaceae
- Genus: Dryopteris
- Species: D. fragrans

Binomial name
- Dryopteris fragrans (Linnaeus) Schott

= Dryopteris fragrans =

Species of fern

Dryopteris fragrans, commonly known as the fragrant woodfern, a circumboreal fern, is the smallest of the Dryopteris species. It can resemble Woodsia ilvensis in the wild, with which it shares the same habitat of rocky areas, shady cliffs, screes, and limestone talus. It typically will not reach more than 25 cm (9.8 in) in height, and accumulates dead fronds around its base.

The name refers to an appealing fruity fragrance (which some liken to primrose) that is exuded by aromatic glands found on the surface of fresh fronds. Others say that it has a spicy odor when dry. The fronds were traditionally made into a tea, as well as used as bedding by Native Americans. Like many other ferns, and members of Dryopteris in particular, however, its plant material can potentially contain an antinutrient, thiaminase, as well as potentially cytotoxic compounds.
