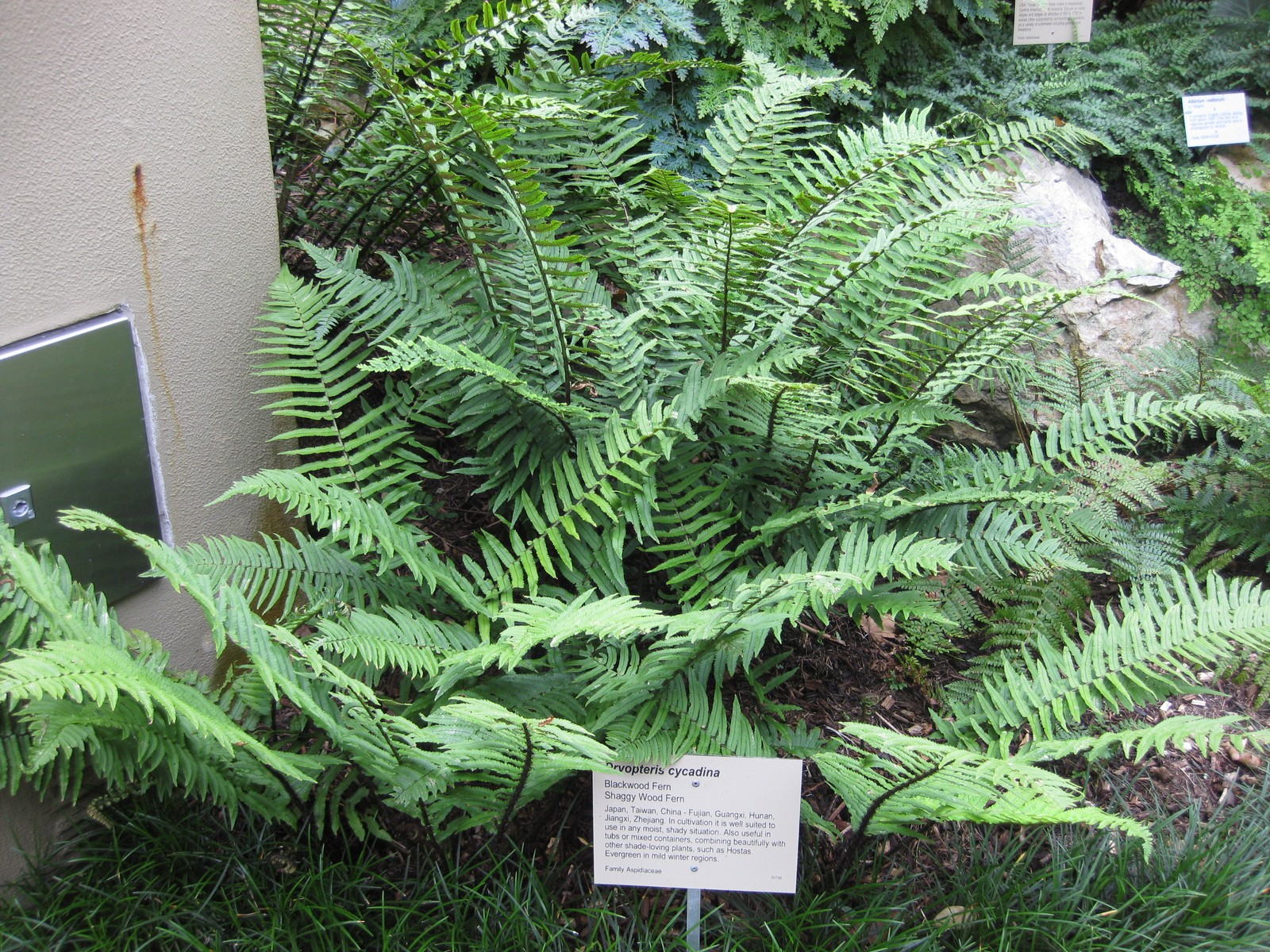
- D. cycadina, Royal Botanic Gardens, Sydney

Scientific classification
- Kingdom: Plantae
- Clade: Tracheophytes
- Division: Polypodiophyta
- Class: Polypodiopsida
- Order: Polypodiales
- Suborder: Polypodiineae
- Family: Dryopteridaceae
- Genus: Dryopteris
- Species: D. cycadina

Binomial name
- Dryopteris cycadina (Franch. & Sav.) C.Chr.

= Dryopteris cycadina =

Species of fern

Dryopteris cycadina, the shaggy shield fern or black wood fern, is a species of deciduous or semi-evergreen fern in the family Dryopteridaceae.

It is native to northern India, China, Taiwan and Japan. It grows to 60 cm (24 in) tall by 45 cm (18 in) wide, and produces pale green fronds maturing to dark green, on erect rhizomes.

It has gained the Royal Horticultural Society's Award of Garden Merit.
