= Dryopteris cognata =

Conservation status
- Critically Endangered (IUCN 3.1)

Scientific classification
- Kingdom: Plantae
- Clade: Embryophytes
- Clade: Tracheophytes
- Division: Polypodiophyta
- Class: Polypodiopsida
- Order: Polypodiales
- Suborder: Polypodiineae
- Family: Dryopteridaceae
- Genus: Dryopteris
- Species: D. cognata

Binomial name
- Dryopteris cognata (C.Presl) Kuntze

Synonyms
- Aspidium cognatum (C.Presl) Fée; Dryopteris fuliginosa C.Chr.; Lastrea cognata C.Presl (1851); Nephrodium cognatum (C.Presl) Hook.

Species of plant

Dryopteris cognata, the large kidney fern, is a herbaceous plant, a member of the Dryopteridaceae family.

== Distribution ==
It is an endemic species to Saint Helena.

== Taxonomy ==
The species was first described as Lastrea cognata by Carl Borivoj Presl in 1851. In 1891 Otto Kuntze placed the species in genus Dryopteris as D. cognata.
