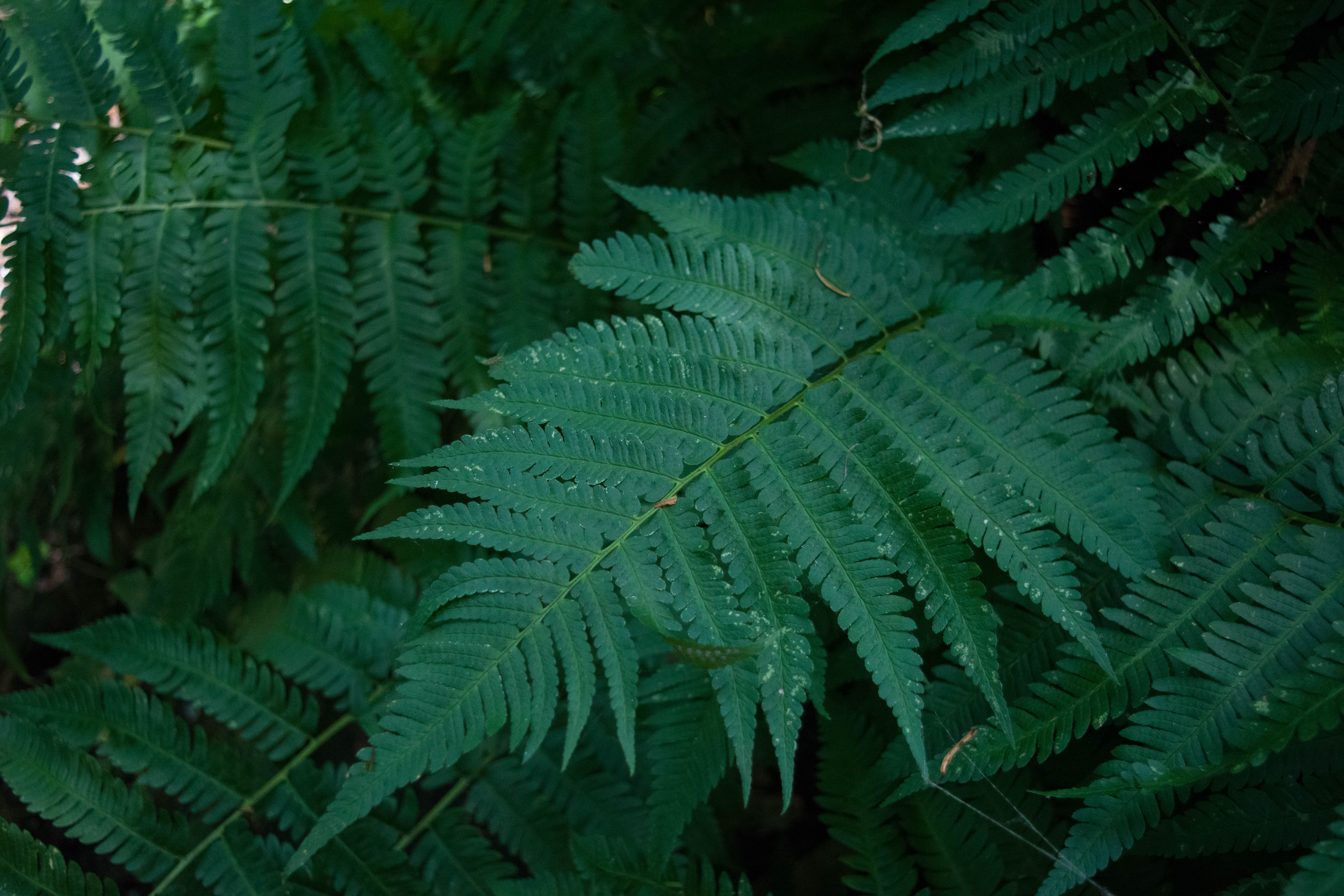
- Showing the distinctive short tapering leaf tip

Conservation status
- Apparently Secure (NatureServe)

Scientific classification
- Kingdom: Plantae
- Clade: Embryophytes
- Clade: Tracheophytes
- Division: Polypodiophyta
- Class: Polypodiopsida
- Order: Polypodiales
- Suborder: Polypodiineae
- Family: Dryopteridaceae
- Genus: Dryopteris
- Species: D. goldieana

Binomial name
- Dryopteris goldieana (Hook. ex Goldie) A.Gray
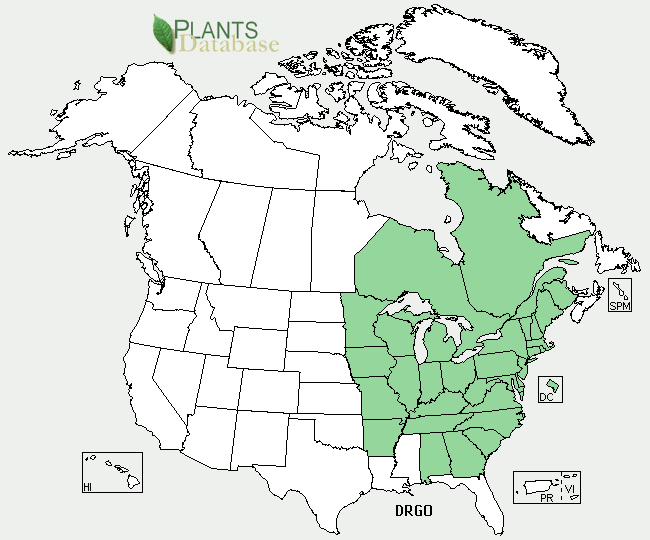
- Range within North America

Synonyms
- Aspidium goldieanum Hook. ex Goldie

= Dryopteris goldieana =

Species of fern

Dryopteris goldieana, commonly called Goldie's wood fern or giant wood fern, is a fern native to the eastern United States and adjacent areas of Canada, from New Brunswick to Ontario and Georgia. It is the largest native North American species of Dryopteris and along with ostrich fern it is one of the largest ferns in eastern North America. Specimens are known with fronds six feet (1.8 meters) tall. D. goldieana hybridizes with many other species of Dryopteris and the hybrids tend to be larger than the pure species. It was named by William Hooker in honor of its discoverer, John Goldie. The epithet was originally published as goldiana, but this is regarded as a misspelling to be corrected.

== Description ==
Goldie's fern is common in moist rich woods, ravines, seeps, or at the edges of swamps and in areas with full or partial shade. It grows in a clumped form where all the leave emerge from the same point on the ground. The stipe, the division of stem which emerges from the roots and holds no leaflets, is very densely covered in dark brown to black scales (which may have a tan border) toward the base and decreases in scale density as it approaches the area containing the leaflets. The stipe itself is 1/3 the length of the total leaf, flat or slightly channeled on the upper side and dark brown to nearly black at the base and fades to green distally. The axis, or portion of the stem which actually supports the leaflets is green and also covered in pale scales.

The leaf itself rather thick in texture but not evergreen. It may range from dark green to golden green color. The leaves may be 35–120 cm in length and 15–40 cm in width depending on the specimen. The base of the leaf is not strongly tapering and the bottom leaflets are only slightly smaller than the leaflets directly above them. The tip of the leaf is rather short or abruptly tapering which is a distinctive characteristic to help distinguish this fern from similar species. The tip of the leaf may also be white mottled in some specimens. The leaf is broken up into many pairs of leaflets which are mostly pinnate but some at the bottom of the leaf may be bipinnately divided. The leaflets are typically tapering at both the base and the tip and have a short stem connecting them to the main stem. The leaflets are themselves divided into many subleaflets which are oblong or elliptic in shape with a pointed tip and a toothed edge. They are generally curved such that the tip of the leaflets points toward the tip of the leaflet.

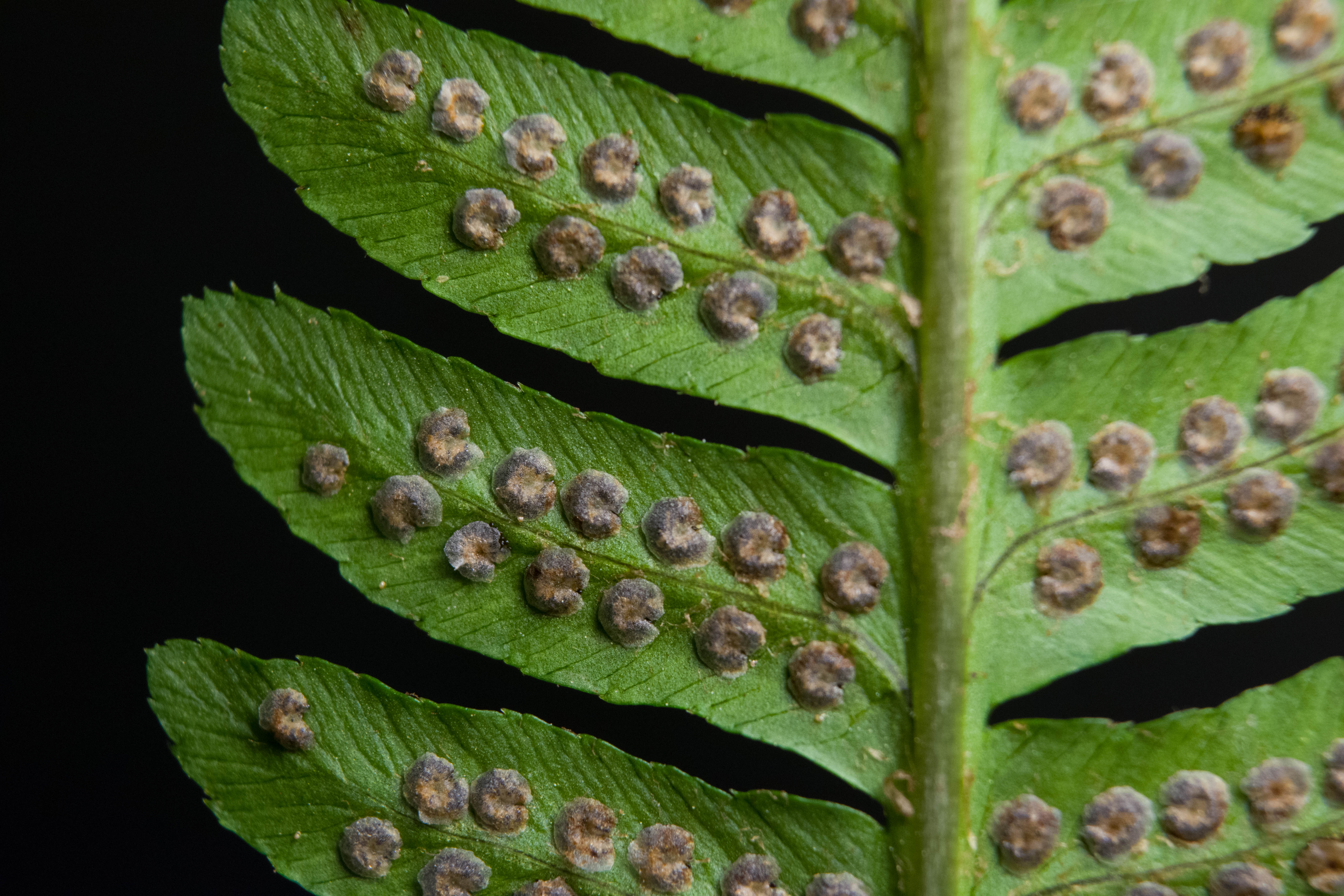
Dryopteris goldieana showing unripe sori

The shapes of fertile (bearing spores and sori) and sterile (lacking spores) leaflets are identical. The sori are typically placed near the midvein and are covered in a smooth, kidney shaped indusium. Each fertile leaflet contains 6–8 pairs of sori which are paired across the midvein. In midsummer the spores turn brown and ripen and are released into the wind.

It is one of the parents of the polyploid hybrids Dryopteris celsa and Dryopteris clintoniana.

From one and a half to two feet in height. Allied to Aspidium Cristatum more than to any other species in the genus; but abundantly distinguishable by the greater breadth of the frond, which gives quite a different outline, and by the form of the pinnae, which are never broader at the base, but are, on the contrary narrower than several of the segments just above them. These segments, too, are longer and narrower, slightly falcate, and those of the lowermost pinnae are never lobed, but simply serrated at the margin. The serratures are likewise terminated by more decided, though short, spinules. The fructifications are central near the midrib, and this circumstance prevents the species from bearing, as it would otherwise do, no inconsiderable affinity to A. marginale.

— Original description

== Cultivation ==
Goldie's fern requires medium sunlight or shade and high humidity conditions to thrive along with moist soil with an abundance of organic matter. It also requires protection from wind.
