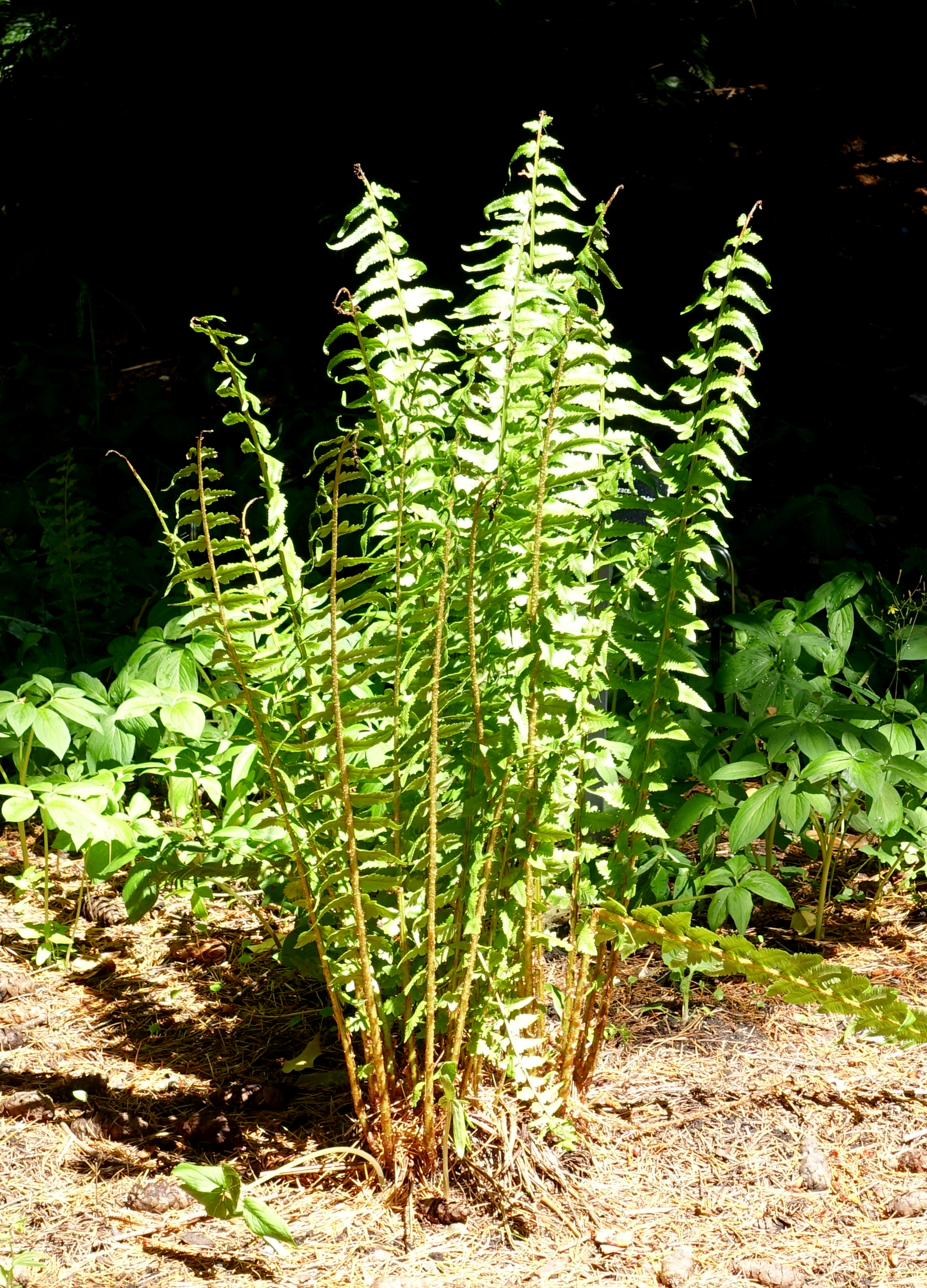

Scientific classification
- Kingdom: Plantae
- Clade: Tracheophytes
- Division: Polypodiophyta
- Class: Polypodiopsida
- Order: Polypodiales
- Suborder: Polypodiineae
- Family: Dryopteridaceae
- Genus: Dryopteris
- Species: D. tokyoensis

Binomial name
- Dryopteris tokyoensis C. Chr.

= Dryopteris tokyoensis =

Species of fern

Dryopteris tokyoensis (Tokyo wood fern, 东京鳞毛蕨) is an erect, vase-shaped, deciduous fern native to Japan, as well as Fujian, Hubei, Hunan, Jiangxi, and Zhejiang provinces in China. These ferns grow to 90–110 cm in height, with each frond containing 20–40 pairs of shallow-lobed, lance-shaped pinnae.

== Synonyms ==
- Dryopteris sanmingensis Ching
