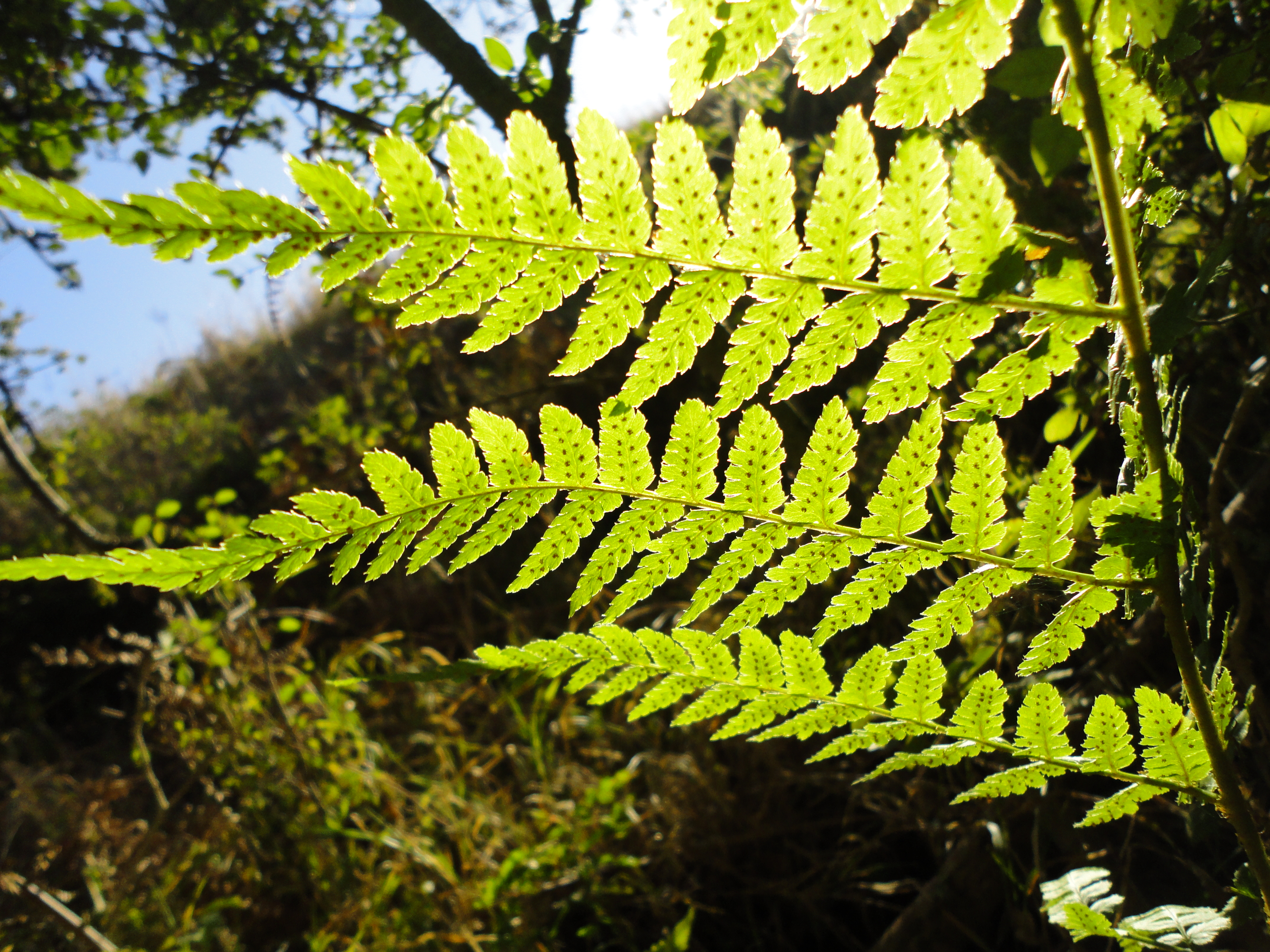

Scientific classification
- Kingdom: Plantae
- Clade: Tracheophytes
- Division: Polypodiophyta
- Class: Polypodiopsida
- Order: Polypodiales
- Suborder: Polypodiineae
- Family: Dryopteridaceae
- Genus: Dryopteris
- Species: D. inaequalis

Binomial name
- Dryopteris inaequalis (Schltdl.) Kuntze

= Dryopteris inaequalis =

Species of fern

Dryopteris inaequalis is an Afrotropical fern species that ranges from tropical and southern Africa to Madagascar. It has been recorded in Tanzania, Zambia, Malawi, Mozambique, Zimbabwe and South Africa, where it is present in the Western Cape, Eastern Cape and KwaZulu-Natal. It is found on forest floors and along forest margins, from middle to high altitudes.

== Description ==
It has a creeping rhizome of up to 3.5 cm in diameter, that bears attenuate pale-brown rhizome-scales of up to 2 cm long. The stipe is up to 80 cm long and is only densely scaled towards its base. The lamina is up to 90 x 33 cm, broadly to narrowly ovate with an acuminate apex with the basal pinnae not reduced, or barely so. The pinnae are up to 33 x 16 cm and form an angle of more than 50° to the rachis. The pinnules are oblong to very narrowly oblong in outline. The rachis becomes glabrous with maturity.

== Varieties ==
- D. inaequalis var. atropaleacea – Tanzania to Zambia. Rhizome and stipe scales black
- D. inaequalis var. inaequalis – Zambia to South Africa. Rhizome and stipe scales brown
