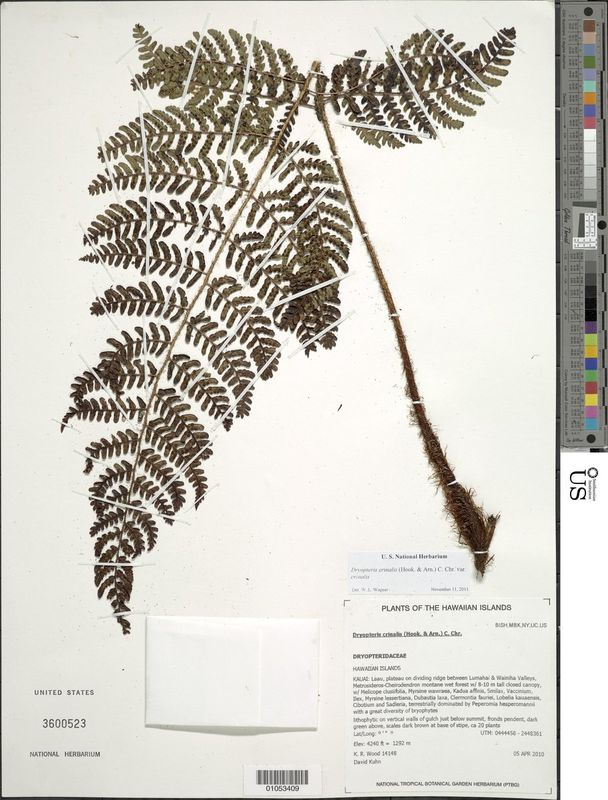

Conservation status
- Vulnerable (NatureServe)

Scientific classification
- Kingdom: Plantae
- Clade: Tracheophytes
- Division: Polypodiophyta
- Class: Polypodiopsida
- Order: Polypodiales
- Suborder: Polypodiineae
- Family: Dryopteridaceae
- Genus: Dryopteris
- Species: D. crinalis

Binomial name
- Dryopteris crinalis (Hook. & Arn.) C.Chr.

= Dryopteris crinalis =

Species of fern

Dryopteris crinalis is a species of fern known as the serpent woodfern. It is endemic to Hawaii, where it is known from the main islands.

There are at least two varieties. The var. podosorus was federally listed as an endangered species of the United States in 2010. There are three populations on Kauai, for a total of no more than 47 individual plants. The fern grows on walls of basalt in wet forests. Fronds grow up to 3 ft (0.91 m) long.
