= Dryopteris hasseltii =

Conservation status
- Endangered (IUCN 3.1)

Scientific classification
- Kingdom: Plantae
- Clade: Tracheophytes
- Division: Polypodiophyta
- Class: Polypodiopsida
- Order: Polypodiales
- Suborder: Polypodiineae
- Family: Dryopteridaceae
- Genus: Dryopteris
- Species: D. hasseltii

Binomial name
- Dryopteris hasseltii (Blume) C.Chr.

Synonyms
- Acrorumohra hasseltii (Blume) Ching; Arachniodes hasseltii (Blume) Ching; Polypodium hasseltii Blume

Species of fern

Dryopteris hasseltii is a species of fern in the family Dryopteridaceae. It occurs from India, through southeast Asia, as far as north-east Queensland in Australia. Its natural habitat is subtropical or tropical moist lowland forests. It is threatened by habitat loss.
