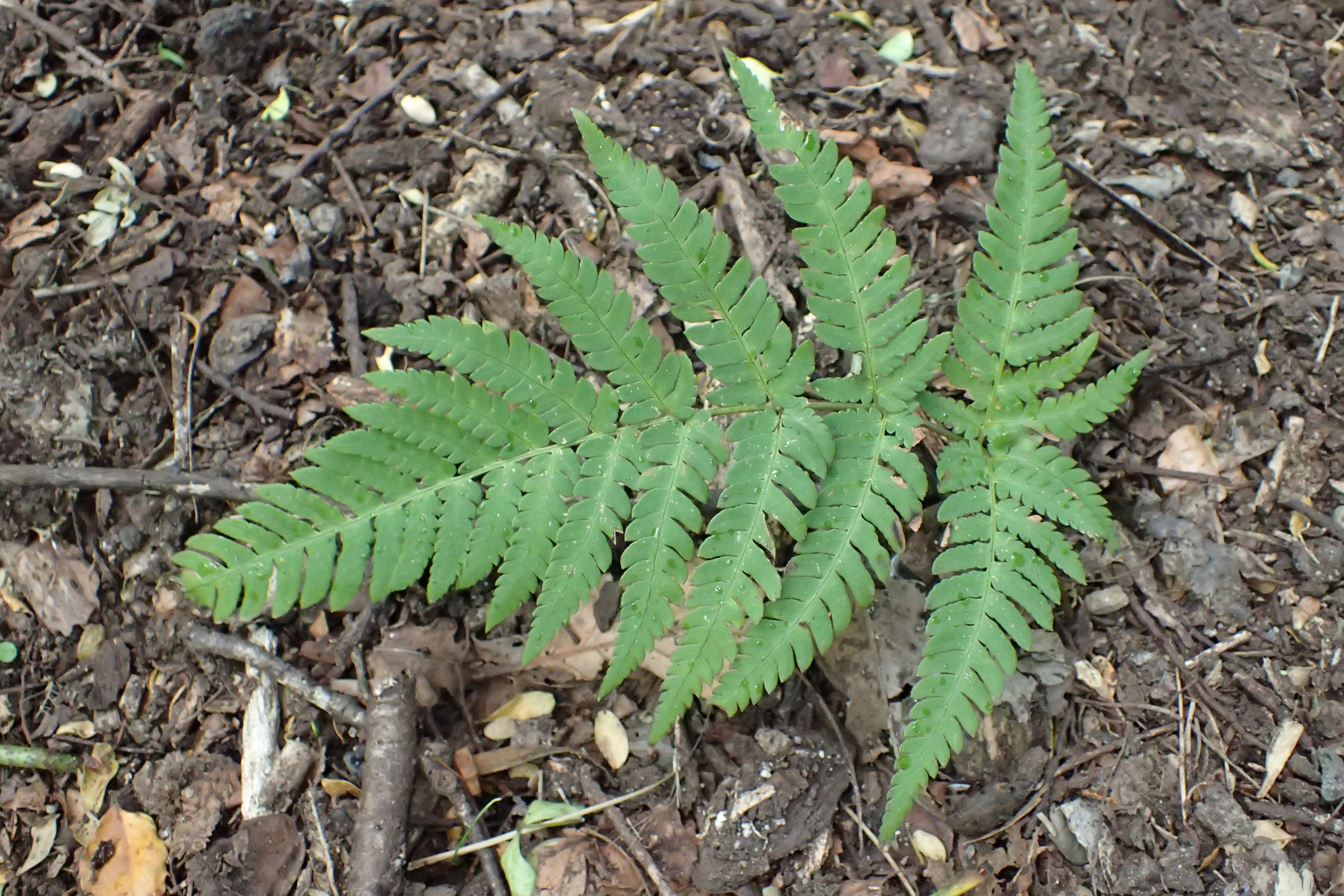

Scientific classification
- Kingdom: Plantae
- Clade: Embryophytes
- Clade: Tracheophytes
- Division: Polypodiophyta
- Class: Polypodiopsida
- Order: Polypodiales
- Suborder: Polypodiineae
- Family: Dryopteridaceae
- Genus: Dryopteris
- Species: D. varia

Binomial name
- Dryopteris varia (L.) Kuntze

= Dryopteris varia =

Species of fern

Dryopteris varia is a species of fern in the family Dryopteridaceae.

The species is native to China, Japan, Korea, Myanmar, Philippines, Taiwan, Vietnam, Sulawesi, and the Ryukyu Islands.
