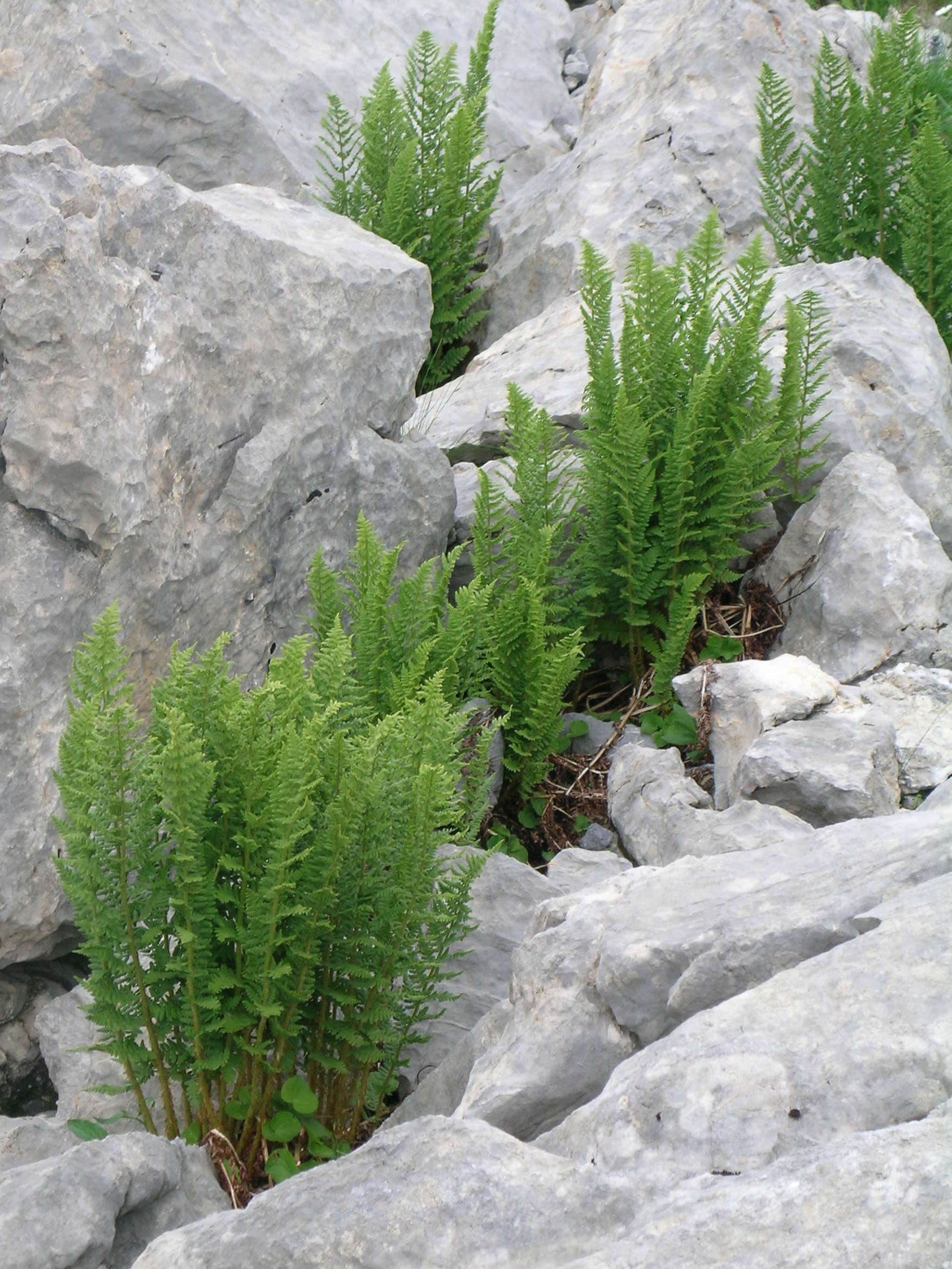

Scientific classification
- Kingdom: Plantae
- Clade: Tracheophytes
- Division: Polypodiophyta
- Class: Polypodiopsida
- Order: Polypodiales
- Suborder: Polypodiineae
- Family: Dryopteridaceae
- Genus: Dryopteris
- Species: D. villarii

Binomial name
- Dryopteris villarii (Bellardi) Woyn. ex Schinz & Thell.

Synonyms
- Nephrodium villarii (Bellardi) Beck.; Polypodium villarii (Bellardi)

= Dryopteris villarii =

Species of plant

Dryopteris villarii, commonly known as the rigid buckler fern, is a perennial leptosporangiate fern native to Central and South East Europe as well as the Western Caucasus. It was first described in 1915.

== Description ==
Dryopteris villarii typically reaches heights around 30 to 60 cm. The rigid, leathery fronds are of a matt glaucous to dark green colour, with scaly reddish petioles and rachis. Fronds may present tufted, erect or spreading. The short bipinnate leaflets are slightly dentate and narrowly oblong-lanceolate, attenuating closer to the base, with yellowish aromatic glands on either side. Rhizomes are far creeping and adventitious, horizontal to ascending. Sori between 0.7 mm to 1 mm, usually with glandular indusium and arranged in two rows along the midrib, usually four to six per row. They do not cover the apex.

== Distribution ==
Dryopteris villarii appears within dolomite and limestone pavements, scree, cliffsides, rocky outcrops, scrub and non-alpine and non-saline grasslands. It is found between 500 m to 2000 m. It is tolerant of any soil type although prefers alkaline.

== Gallery ==
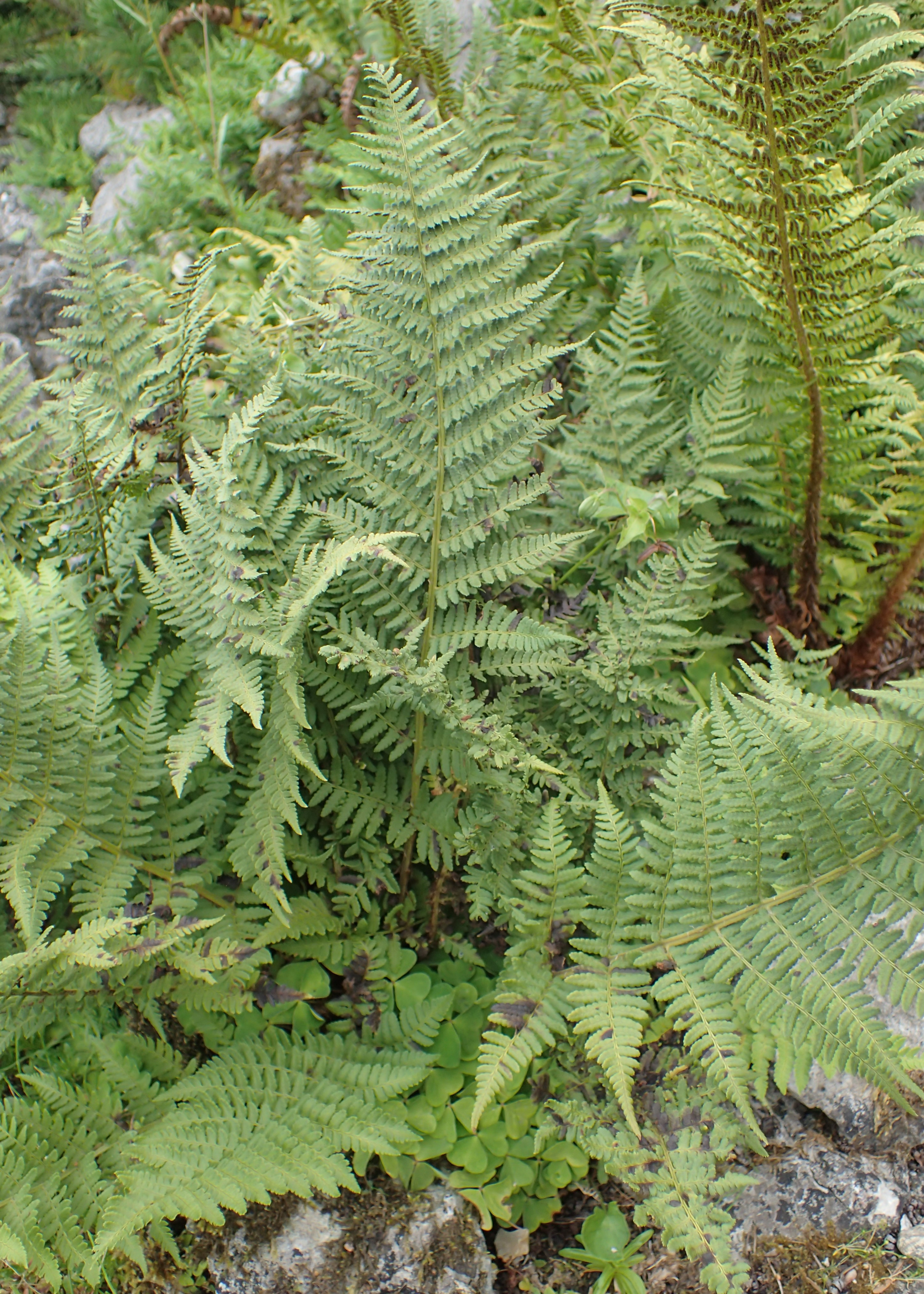

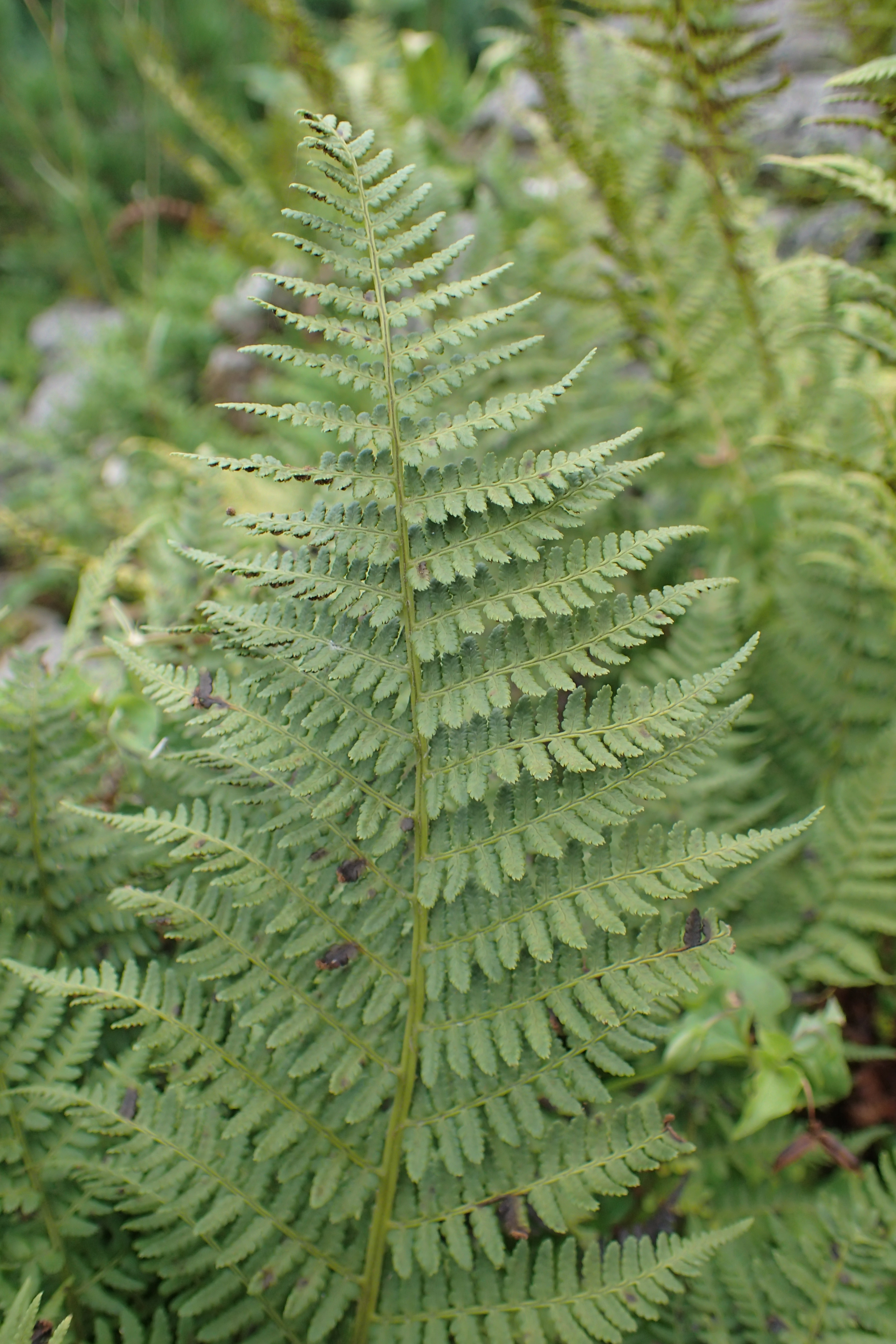
