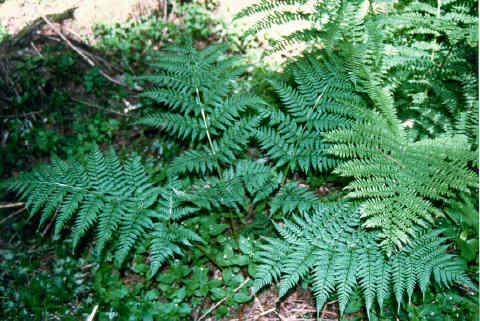

Conservation status
- Secure (NatureServe)

Scientific classification
- Kingdom: Plantae
- Clade: Tracheophytes
- Division: Polypodiophyta
- Class: Polypodiopsida
- Order: Polypodiales
- Suborder: Polypodiineae
- Family: Dryopteridaceae
- Genus: Dryopteris
- Species: D. expansa

Binomial name
- Dryopteris expansa (C. Presl) Fraser-Jenk. & Jermy

= Dryopteris expansa =

Species of fern

Dryopteris expansa, the alpine buckler fern, northern buckler-fern or spreading wood fern, is a species of perennial fern native to cool temperate and subarctic regions of the Northern Hemisphere, south at high altitudes in mountains to Spain and Greece in southern Europe, to Japan in eastern Asia, and to central California in North America. It prefers cool, moist mixed or evergreen forests and rock crevices on alpine slopes, often growing on rotting logs and tree stumps and rocky slopes. It is characteristically riparian in nature, and is especially associated with stream banks.

== Description ==
It has a short rootstock. The leaves are with large, green lacy fronds typically 30–120 cm (12–47 in). The petiole is usually about half the length of the leaf blade and brown scaled. The scales are black-ish in the middle. The leaf blade is triangular and sparsely glandular on the underside. The deltate fronds are bipinnate at the base, pinnate toward the apex. The rhizome is erect or ascending, often producing offshoots. Sori occur medially on the underside of the pinnae. Propagation is by spores and vegetatively by division of the rhizome.

It is easily confused with the related Dryopteris dilatata (broad buckler fern), differing in the usually smaller fronds, and in the pale brown scales on the frond stem being more uniform in color, rarely having a dark central stripe. It also differs in cytology in having 2n = 82 chromosomes (164 in D. dilatata). Leaves of D. expansa are very similar to those of D. arguta.

== Taxonomy ==
Dryopteris expansa was given its first scientific description in 1825 by Carl Borivoj Presl in 1825, who named it Nephrodium expansum. It was described in the book Reliquiae Haenkeanae as being described from a specimen collected at Nootka Sound. However, the type locations in that work cannot be relied upon due to mistakes made when the specimens were originally collected or during the long storage before being examined by Presl. The specimens were collected by Thaddäus Haenke during his long travels and sent back to Europe where they sat unregarded for at least 25 years until they were acquired by the Bohemian National Museum at Prague in 1821 and were finally examined in detail.

=== Names ===
The species name of this fern, expansa, is from the Latin expando, meaning "to spread out, spread apart, to expand". Other common names include northern wood fern, arching wood fern, spiny wood fern and crested wood fern.

The Finnish name is isoalvejuuri which directly translates to "large cestoda root" likely referring to its relations to use of other buckler ferns as worm expellent in traditional Finnish medicine especially Dryopteris filix-mas.

== Uses ==
The root contains filicin, a substance that paralyses tapeworms and other internal parasites and has been used in herbal medicine as a worm expellent.

== Toxicity ==
This plant is toxic.
