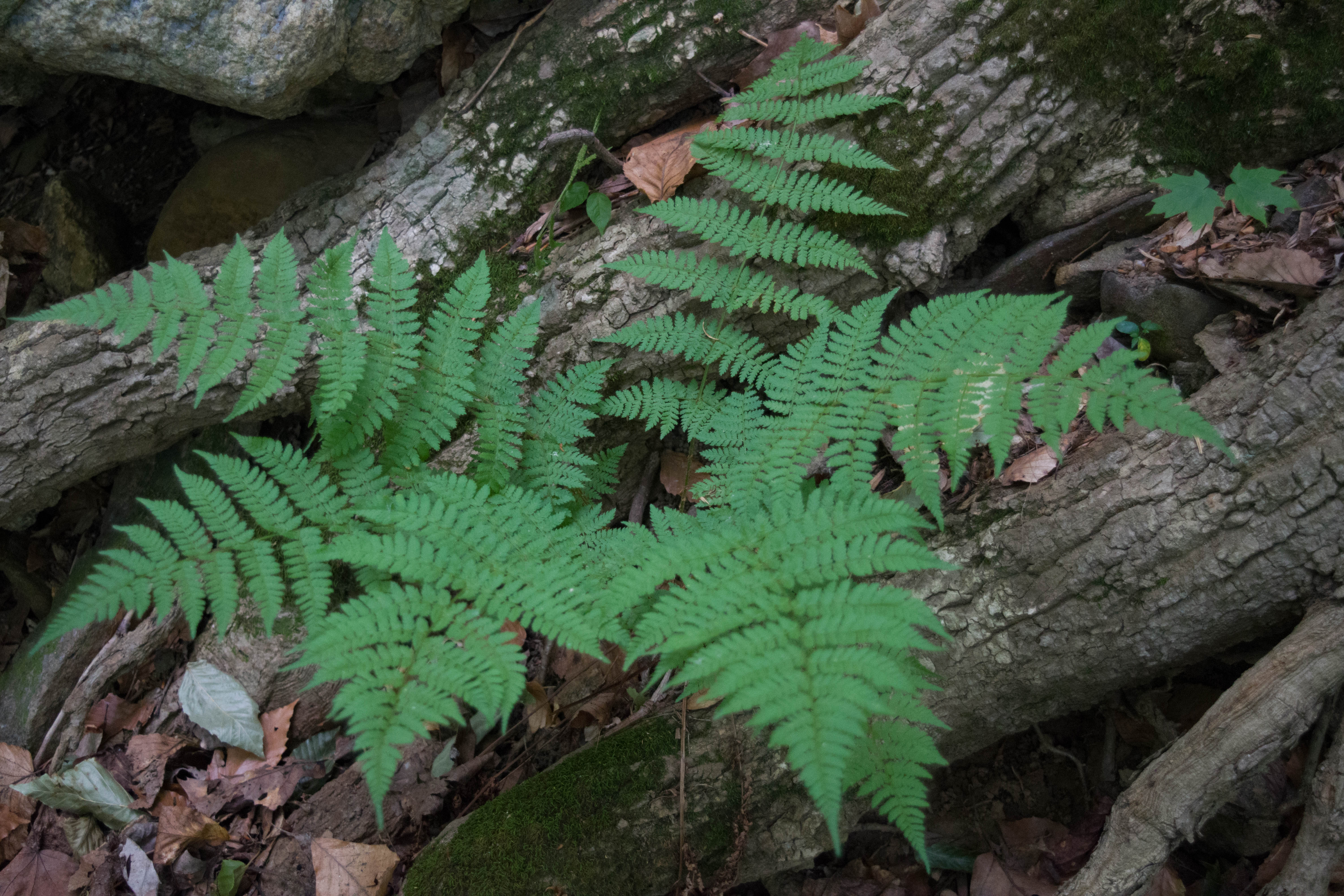
- Growing in Pennsylvania

Conservation status
- Secure (NatureServe)

Scientific classification
- Kingdom: Plantae
- Clade: Tracheophytes
- Division: Polypodiophyta
- Class: Polypodiopsida
- Order: Polypodiales
- Suborder: Polypodiineae
- Family: Dryopteridaceae
- Genus: Dryopteris
- Species: D. carthusiana

Binomial name
- Dryopteris carthusiana (Vill.) H.P. Fuchs

Synonyms
- D. spinulosa (O.F. Muell.) O. Kuntze; D. austriaca var. spinulosa (O.F. Müll.) Fiori; Polypodium carthusianum Vill.; Polypodium spinulosum O.F. Müll.

= Dryopteris carthusiana =

Species of fern

Dryopteris carthusiana is a perennial species of fern native to damp forests throughout the Holarctic Kingdom. It is known as the narrow buckler-fern in the United Kingdom, and as the spinulose woodfern in North America.

It is a tetraploid of hybrid origin, one parent being Dryopteris intermedia, known in North America as the intermediate wood fern, and an unknown, apparently extinct species dubbed Dryopteris semicristata, which is also the presumed parent of the hybrid-origin Dryopteris cristata.

== Description ==
This dark green plant is upright-ish, growing in leaf bunches, with wide leaves. It has a short rootstock. The leaves are upright in sparse-ish bunches and overwintering, 30-50 cm. The leaf stalk is about the length of the leaf blade and light-brown scaled. The leaf blade is narrowly ovate double pinnate. The leaflets are narrowly triangular. The sporangium are located on the underside of the leaves in round kidney-like sori.

This fern is often confused with several other wood fern species, including D. intermedia, D. campyloptera, and D. expansa. It especially extensively shares the range of D. intermedia, but the two may be distinguished by the innermost pinnule on the bottom side of the bottom pinna: this pinnule is longer than the adjacent pinnules in D. carthusiana, but shorter or even in D. intermedia. D. carthusiana is a sub-evergreen species, its fronds surviving mild winters but dying back in harsh winters.

== Habitat ==
The plant favors acidic ground and even avoids lime rich soil and spring areas favored by many other pteridophyta. It can tolerate direct sunlight slightly better than its relatives and can therefore survive even in some logging sites and benefit from them. It grows often in the following habitats: moist depressions in forests, nemoral forests, coastal scrubs, fresh cliff faces, sides of ditches, coniferous swamps and herb-rich hardwood-spruce swamps (ruohokorpi in Finnish).

It is known to be able to use artificial light to grow in places which are otherwise devoid of natural light, such as Niagara Cave.

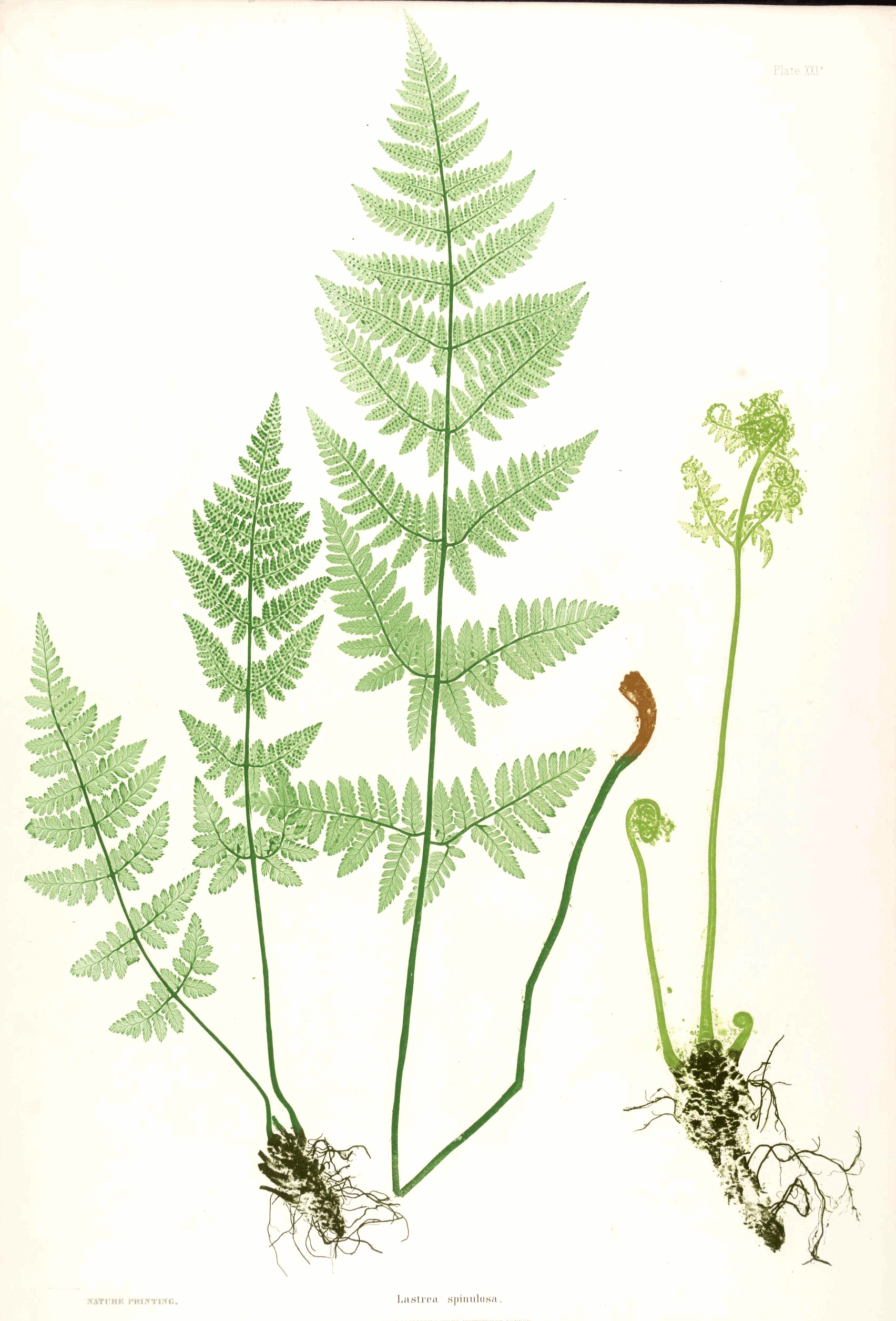
A nature print of Dryopteris carthusiana
