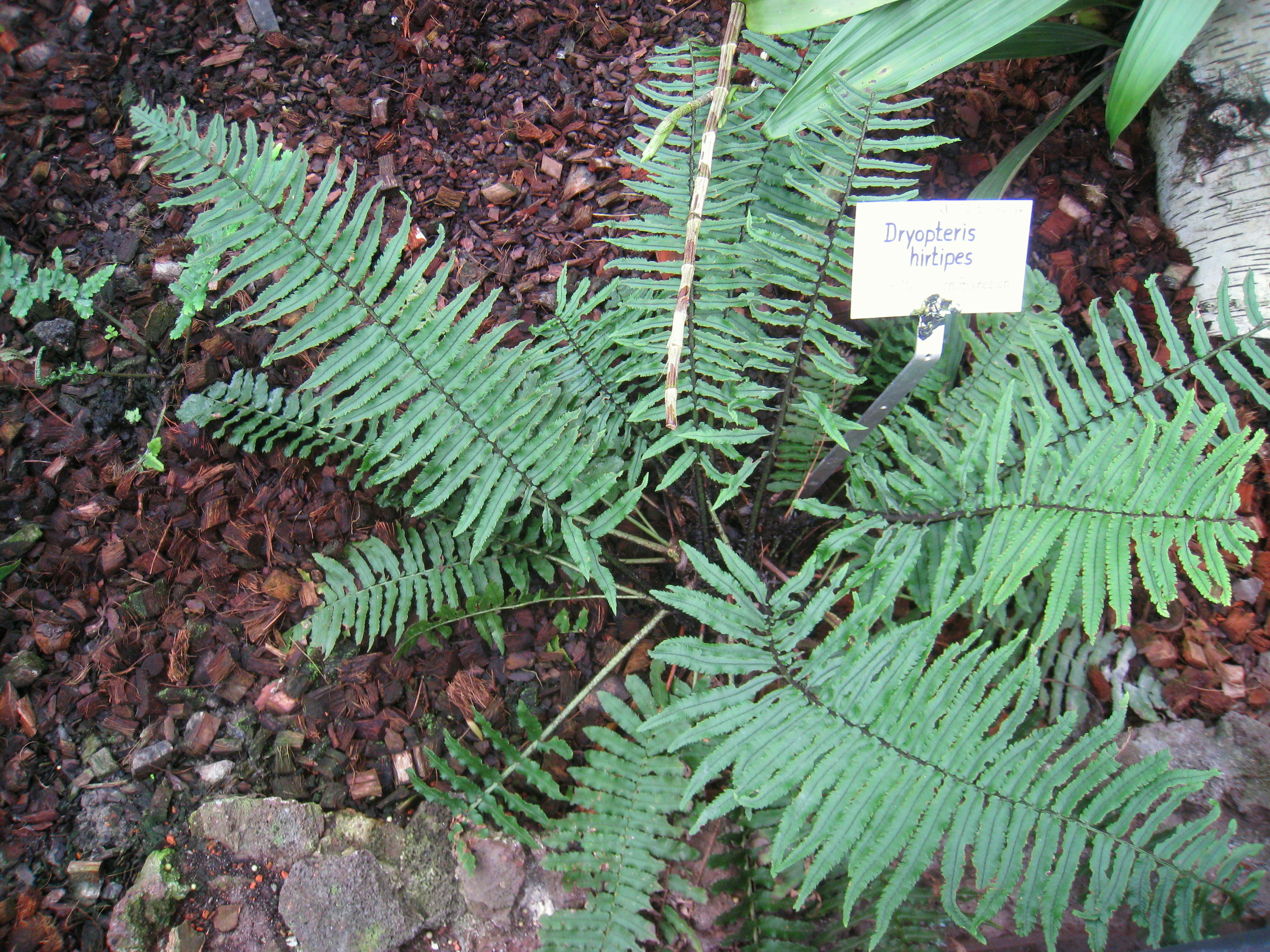

Scientific classification
- Kingdom: Plantae
- Clade: Tracheophytes
- Division: Polypodiophyta
- Class: Polypodiopsida
- Order: Polypodiales
- Suborder: Polypodiineae
- Family: Dryopteridaceae
- Genus: Dryopteris
- Species: D. hirtipes

Binomial name
- Dryopteris hirtipes (Blume) Kuntze

= Dryopteris hirtipes =

Species of fern

Dryopteris hirtipes is fern species native to South China and Papua New Guinea.
