= Dryopteris cinnamomea =

Scientific classification
- Kingdom: Plantae
- Clade: Tracheophytes
- Division: Polypodiophyta
- Class: Polypodiopsida
- Order: Polypodiales
- Suborder: Polypodiineae
- Family: Dryopteridaceae
- Genus: Dryopteris
- Species: D. cinnamomea

Binomial name
- Dryopteris cinnamomea (Cav.) C.Chr.

Species of plant

Dryopteris cinnamomea is a fern species belonging to the family Dryopteridaceae, native primarily to Mexico and the southern United States, particularly Texas and Arizona. It is part of the Dryopteris patula complex, a taxonomically challenging group of closely related species characterized by morphological variation in frond architecture and scale features. Morphometric analyses have confirmed D. cinnamomea as a distinct and valid species within this complex, distinguishable by a combination of traits such as basal pinna length, stipe scale morphology, and frond dimensions.

== Description ==
The species is characterized by a short-creeping rhizome covered with light to dark brown scales, a diagnostic feature distinguishing it from other members of the D. patula complex. Its fronds are erect to arching, typically bipinnate to tripinnate, and range from 30 to 70 cm in length. The stipe (leaf stalk) bears thin, lanceolate scales that are cinnamon-colored—an attribute that inspired the species epithet cinnamomea.
