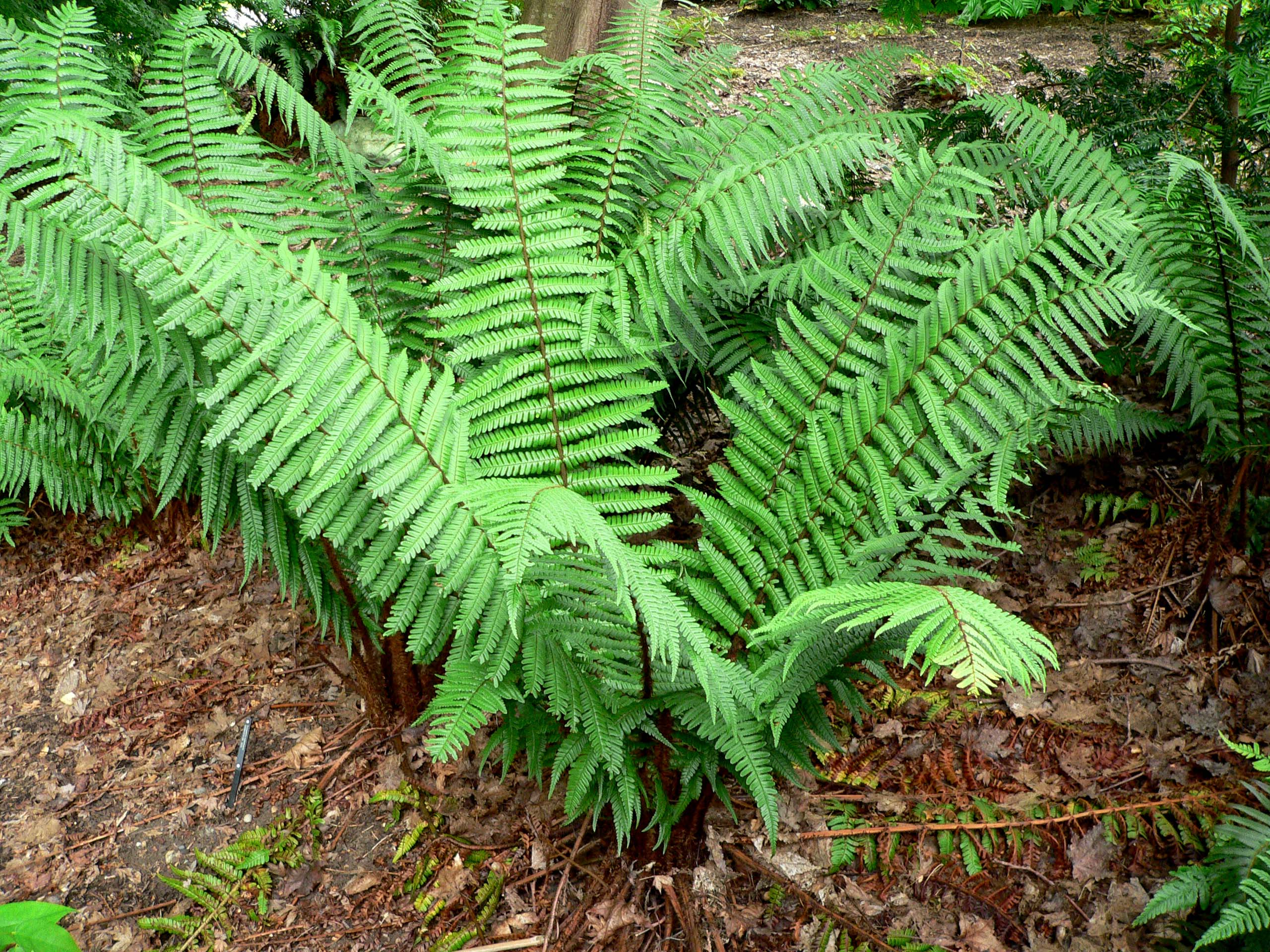
- D. wallichiana, UBC

Scientific classification
- Kingdom: Plantae
- Clade: Tracheophytes
- Division: Polypodiophyta
- Class: Polypodiopsida
- Order: Polypodiales
- Suborder: Polypodiineae
- Family: Dryopteridaceae
- Genus: Dryopteris
- Species: D. wallichiana

Binomial name
- Dryopteris wallichiana (Spreng.) Hyl.

= Dryopteris wallichiana =

Species of fern

Dryopteris wallichiana, the alpine wood fern, is a robust species of deciduous or semi-evergreen fern in the family Dryopteridaceae, native to the Himalayas, Hawaii, Mexico and Jamaica. It grows to 90 cm (35 in) tall, occasionally 180 cm (71 in) by 75 cm (30 in) wide, with pale green tripinnate fronds, strongly contrasting with the dark brown ribs.

The Latin specific epithet wallichiana refers to the 19th century Danish botanist Nathaniel Wallich.

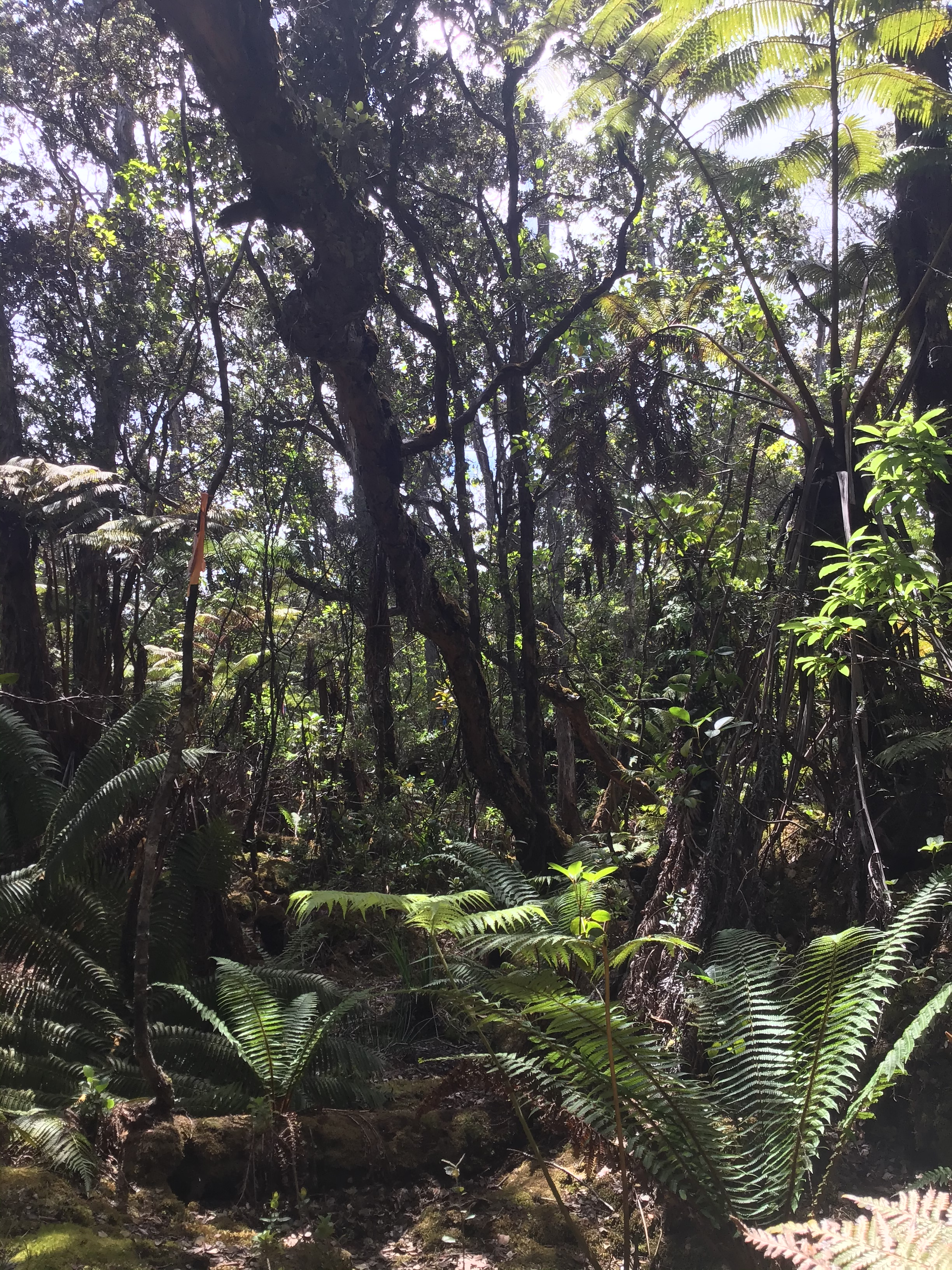

A popular plant in cultivation, it has gained the Royal Horticultural Society's Award of Garden Merit.
