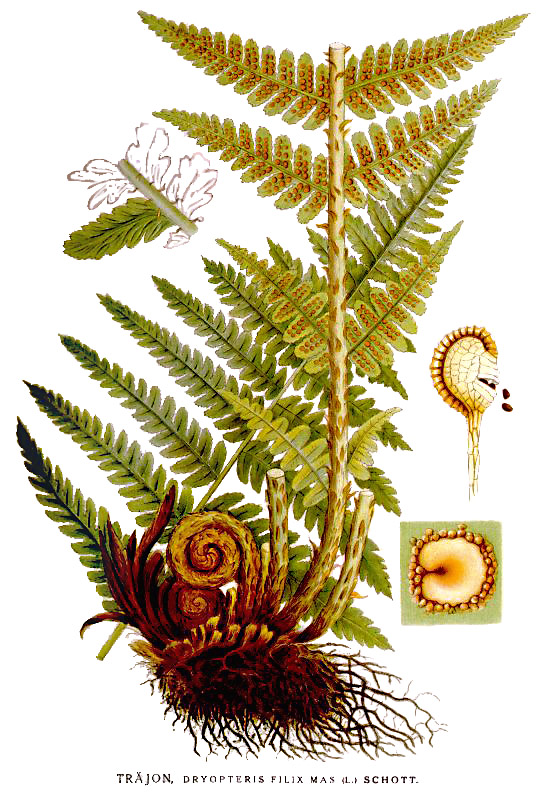
- Male fern (Dryopteris filix-mas)

Scientific classification
- Kingdom: Plantae
- Clade: Tracheophytes
- Division: Polypodiophyta
- Class: Polypodiopsida
- Order: Polypodiales
- Suborder: Polypodiineae
- Family: Dryopteridaceae
- Subfamily: Dryopteridoideae
- Genus: Dryopteris; Adans.

Species
- See text

Synonyms
- Acrophorus C.Presl; Acrorumohra (H.Itô) H.Itô; Arthrobotrys Wall.; Desmopodium J.Sm.; Diacalpe Blume; Dichasium (A.Braun) Fée; Diclisodon T.Moore; Dryopsis Holttum & P.J.Edwards; Filix Ség.; Filix-mas Hill ex Farw.; Gymnothalamium Zenker ex Kunze; Lophodium Newman; Nephrodium Marthe ex Michx.; Nothoperanema (Tagawa) Ching; Peranema D.Don; Pycnopteris T.Moore; Revwattsia D.L.Jones; Sphaeropteris Wall.; Stenolepia Alderw.

= Dryopteris =

Dryopteris Temporal range: 89–0 Ma Coniacian – present

Genus of plants

The moth genus Dryopteris is now considered a junior synonym of Oreta.

Dryopteris /draɪˈɒptərɪs/, commonly called the wood ferns, male ferns (referring in particular to Dryopteris filix-mas), or buckler ferns, is a fern genus in the family Dryopteridaceae, subfamily Dryopteridoideae, according to the Pteridophyte Phylogeny Group classification of 2016 (PPG I). There are about 300-400 species in the genus. The species are distributed in Asia, the Americas, Europe, Africa, and the Pacific islands, with the highest diversity in eastern Asia. It is placed in the family Dryopteridaceae, subfamily Dryopteridoideae, according to the Pteridophyte Phylogeny Group classification of 2016 (PPG I). Many of the species have stout, slowly creeping rootstocks that form a crown, with a vase-like ring of fronds. The sori are round, with a peltate indusium. The stipes have prominent scales.

Hybridization and polyploidy are well-known phenomena in this group, with many species formed via these processes. The North American Dryopteris hybrid complex is a well-known example of speciation via allopolyploid hybridization.

The fossil record of this genus shows that it was widespread even as far back as the Cretaceous with fossils being found in Late Cretaceous rock layers from North America down to Antarctica.

== Selected species ==
The genus has a large number of species. The PPG I classification suggested there were about 400 species; as of February 2020, the Checklist of Ferns and Lycophytes of the World listed 328 species and 83 hybrids. Some genera sunk into Dryopteris, such as Dryopsis and Nothoperanema, are distinguished by other sources.

- Dryopteris acutodentata Ching
- Dryopteris adnata (Blume) Alderw.
- Dryopteris aemula (Aiton) Kuntze – hay-scented buckler fern
- Dryopteris affinis (Lowe) Fraser-Jenk. – scaly male fern
- Dryopteris aitoniana Pic.Serm.
- Dryopteris × alejandrei Pérez Carro & Fern.Areces
- Dryopteris × algonquinensis D.M.Britton
- Dryopteris alpestris Tagawa
- Dryopteris × alpirsbachensis Freigang, Zenner, Bujnoch, S.Jess. & Magauer
- Dryopteris amblyodonta J.P.Roux
- Dryopteris × ambroseae Fraser-Jenk. & Jermy
- Dryopteris amurensis (Milde) Christ
- Dryopteris aneitensis (Hook.) C.Chr.
- Dryopteris angustifrons (T.Moore) Kuntze
- Dryopteris angustipalea Darnaedi, M.Kato & K.Iwats.
- Dryopteris annamensis (Tagawa) Li Bing Zhang
- Dryopteris antarctica (Baker) C.Chr.
- Dryopteris anthracinisquama Miyam.
- Dryopteris apiciflora (Wall. ex Mett.) Kuntze
- Dryopteris approximata Sledge
- Dryopteris × apuana Gibby, S.Jess. & Marchetti
- Dryopteris aquilinoides (Desv.) C.Chr.
- Dryopteris arborescens (Baker) Kuntze
- Dryopteris ardechensis Fraser-Jenk.
- Dryopteris × arecesiae Pérez Carro & T.E.Díaz
- Dryopteris arguta (Kaulf.) Watt – coastal wood fern
- Dryopteris arunachalensis (Fraser-Jenk. & Benniamin) R.Kr.Singh & V.K.Rawat
- Dryopteris ascensionis (Hook.) Kuntze
- Dryopteris assamensis (C.Hope) C.Chr. & Ching
- Dryopteris × asturiensis Fraser-Jenk. & Gibby
- Dryopteris athamantica (Kunze) Kuntze
- Dryopteris atrata (Wall. ex Kunze) Ching
- Dryopteris aurantiaca J.P.Roux
- Dryopteris × australis (Wherry) Small
- Dryopteris austroindica Fraser-Jenk.
- Dryopteris bamleriana Rosenst.
- Dryopteris baniensis Rosenst.
- Dryopteris barbigera (Hook.) Kuntze
- Dryopteris basisora Christ
- Dryopteris × benedictii (Farw.) Wherry
- Dryopteris bernieri Tardieu
- Dryopteris bhutanica (Fraser-Jenk. & Pariyar) Fraser-Jenk.
- Dryopteris bissetiana (Baker) C.Chr.
- Dryopteris blandfordii (C.Hope) C.Chr.
- Dryopteris bodinieri (Christ) C.Chr.
- Dryopteris bojeri Kuntze
- Dryopteris × boottii (Tuck.) Underw.
- Dryopteris borbasii Litard.
- Dryopteris × brathaica Fraser-Jenk. & Reichst.
- Dryopteris × burgessii B.Boivin
- Dryopteris burnatii Christ & Wilczek
- Dryopteris cacaina Tagawa
- Dryopteris campyloptera Clarkson – mountain wood fern
- Dryopteris camusiae Fraser-Jenk.
- Dryopteris × cantabrica Alejandre, Pérez Carro & Fern.Areces
- Dryopteris caperata J.P.Roux
- Dryopteris caroli-hopei Fraser-Jenk.
- Dryopteris carpatica S.Jess. & Bujnoch
- Dryopteris carthusiana (Vill.) H.P.Fuchs – narrow buckler fern
- Dryopteris caucasica (A.Braun) Fraser-Jenk. & Corley
- Dryopteris caudipinna Nakai
- Dryopteris × cedroensis Gibby & Widén
- Dryopteris celsa (W.Palmer) Knowlt., T.S.Palmer & Pollard ex Small – log fern
- Dryopteris chaerophyllifolia (Zippel) C.Chr.
- Dryopteris championii (Benth.) C.Chr.
- Dryopteris chichisimensis Nakai ex H.Itô
- Dryopteris chinensis (Baker) Koidz.
- Dryopteris christenseniae (Ching) Li Bing Zhang
- Dryopteris chrysocoma (Christ) C.Chr.
- Dryopteris cicatricata J.P.Roux
- Dryopteris cinnamomea (Cav.) C.Chr. – cinnamon wood fern
- Dryopteris clarkei (Baker) Kuntze
- Dryopteris clintoniana (D.C.Eaton) Dowell – Clinton's wood fern
- Dryopteris cochleata (D.Don) C.Chr.
- Dryopteris cognata (C.Presl) Kuntze
- Dryopteris collucata Charit.
- Dryopteris commixta Tagawa
- Dryopteris comorensis (Tardieu) Fraser-Jenk.
- Dryopteris × complexa Fraser-Jenk.
- Dryopteris conjugata Ching
- Dryopteris conversa Alderw.
- Dryopteris coreanomontana Nakai
- Dryopteris corleyi Fraser-Jenk.
- Dryopteris × correllii W.H.Wagner & A.V.Gilman
- Dryopteris costalisora Tagawa
- Dryopteris crassirhizoma Nakai
- Dryopteris crinalis (Hook. & Arn.) C.Chr.
- Dryopteris crispifolia Rasbach, Reichst. & G.Vida
- Dryopteris cristata (L.) A.Gray – crested buckler fern
- Dryopteris cycadina Franch. & Sav.) C.Chr.
- Dryopteris cyclopeltidiformis C.Chr.
- Dryopteris cyclosorus Alderw.
- Dryopteris damingshanensis Li Bing Zhang & H.M.Liu
- Dryopteris daozhenensis P.S.Wang & X.Y.Wang
- Dryopteris decipiens (Hook.) Kuntze
- Dryopteris dehuaensis Ching & K.H.Shing
- Dryopteris dickinsii (Franch. & Sav.) C.Chr.
- Dryopteris dilatata (Hoffm.) A.Gray – broad buckler fern
- Dryopteris dracomontana Schelpe & N.C.Anthony
- Dryopteris enneaphylla (Baker) C.Chr.
- Dryopteris erythrosora (D.C.Eaton) Kuntze – autumn fern
- Dryopteris erythrovaria K.Hori & N.Murak.
- Dryopteris expansa (C.Presl) Fraser-Jenk. & Jermy – northern buckler fern
- Dryopteris fadenii Pic.Serm.
- Dryopteris fangii Ching, Fraser-Jenk. & Z.R.Wang
- Dryopteris filix-mas (L.) Schott – male fern
- Dryopteris flemingii Fraser-Jenk.
- Dryopteris formosana (Christ) C.Chr.
- Dryopteris fragrans (L.) Schott – fragrant buckler fern, fragrant wood fern
- Dryopteris fructuosa (Christ) C.Chr.
- Dryopteris fuscipes C.Chr.
- Dryopteris gamblei (C.Hope) C.Chr.
- Dryopteris goerigiana (Kunze) Koidz.
- Dryopteris goldieana (Hook. ex Goldie) A.Gray – Goldie's wood fern
- Dryopteris guanchica Gibby & Jermy
- Dryopteris gymnophylla (Baker) C.Chr.
- Dryopteris gymnosora (Makino) C.Chr.
- Dryopteris hasseltii (Blume) C.Chr.
- Dryopteris hendersoni (Bedd.) C.Chr.
- Dryopteris hirtipes (Blume) Kuntze
- Dryopteris immixta Ching
- Dryopteris inaequalis (Schltdl.) Kuntze
- Dryopteris integriloba C.Chr.
- Dryopteris integripinnula Ching
- Dryopteris intermedia A.Gray – intermediate wood fern
- Dryopteris juxtaposita Christ
- Dryopteris kinkiensis Koidz. ex Tagawa
- Dryopteris labordei (Christ) C.Chr.
- Dryopteris lacera (Thunb.) Kuntze
- Dryopteris lepidopoda Hayata
- Dryopteris lepidorachis C.Chr.
- Dryopteris ludoviciana (Kunze) Small – southern wood fern
- Dryopteris macropholis Lorence & W.L.Wagner
- Dryopteris marginalis (L.) A.Gray – marginal wood fern
- Dryopteris mindshelkensis Pavlov – rigid buckler fern
- Dryopteris monticola (Makino) C.Chr.
- Dryopteris montigena Ching
- Dryopteris nigropaleacea (Fraser-Jenk.) Fraser-Jenk.
- Dryopteris odontoloma (T.Moore ex Bedd.) C.Chr.
- Dryopteris oreades Fomin – mountain male fern
- Dryopteris pallida (Bory) Maire & Petitm.
- Dryopteris panda (C.B.Clarke) C.Chr.
- Dryopteris peninsulae Kitag.
- Dryopteris podophylla (Hook.) Kuntze
- Dryopteris polita Rosenst.
- Dryopteris raiateensis (J.W.Moore) Li Bing Zhang
- Dryopteris reflexosquamata Hayata
- Dryopteris remota (A.Braun ex Doll) Druce – scaly buckler fern
- Dryopteris rosthornii (Diels) C.Chr.
- Dryopteris sacrosancta Koidz.
- Dryopteris saxifraga H.Itô
- Dryopteris scottii (Bedd.) Ching
- Dryopteris sericea C.Chr.
- Dryopteris × shibipedis Sa.Kurata
- Dryopteris sichotensis Kom.
- Dryopteris sieboldii (T.Moore) Kuntze
- Dryopteris sikkimensis (Bedd.) Kuntze
- Dryopteris sordidipes Tagawa
- Dryopteris sparsa (D.Don) Kuntze
- Dryopteris squamiseta (Hook.) Kuntze
- Dryopteris stenolepis (Baker) C.Chr.
- Dryopteris subatrata Tagawa
- Dryopteris subexaltata (Christ) C.Chr.
- Dryopteris sublacera Christ
- Dryopteris submarginata Rosenst.
- Dryopteris subtriangularis (C.Hope) C.Chr.
- Dryopteris tenuicula C.G.Matthew & Christ
- Dryopteris tokyoensis (Makino) C.Chr. – Tokyo wood fern
- Dryopteris tyrrhena Fraser-Jenk. & Reichst
- Dryopteris uniformis (Makino) Makino
- Dryopteris varia (L.) Kuntze
- Dryopteris villarii (Bellardi) Woyn.
- Dryopteris wallichiana (Spreng.) Hyl. – alpine wood fern
- Dryopteris wulingshanensis J.P.Shu, Y.H.Yan & R.J.Wang
- Dryopteris wuyishanica Ching & P.C.Chiu
- Dryopteris xanthomelas (Christ) C.Chr.
- Dryopteris yongdeensis W.M.Chu ex S.G.Lu
- Dryopteris zayuensis Ching & S.K.Wu
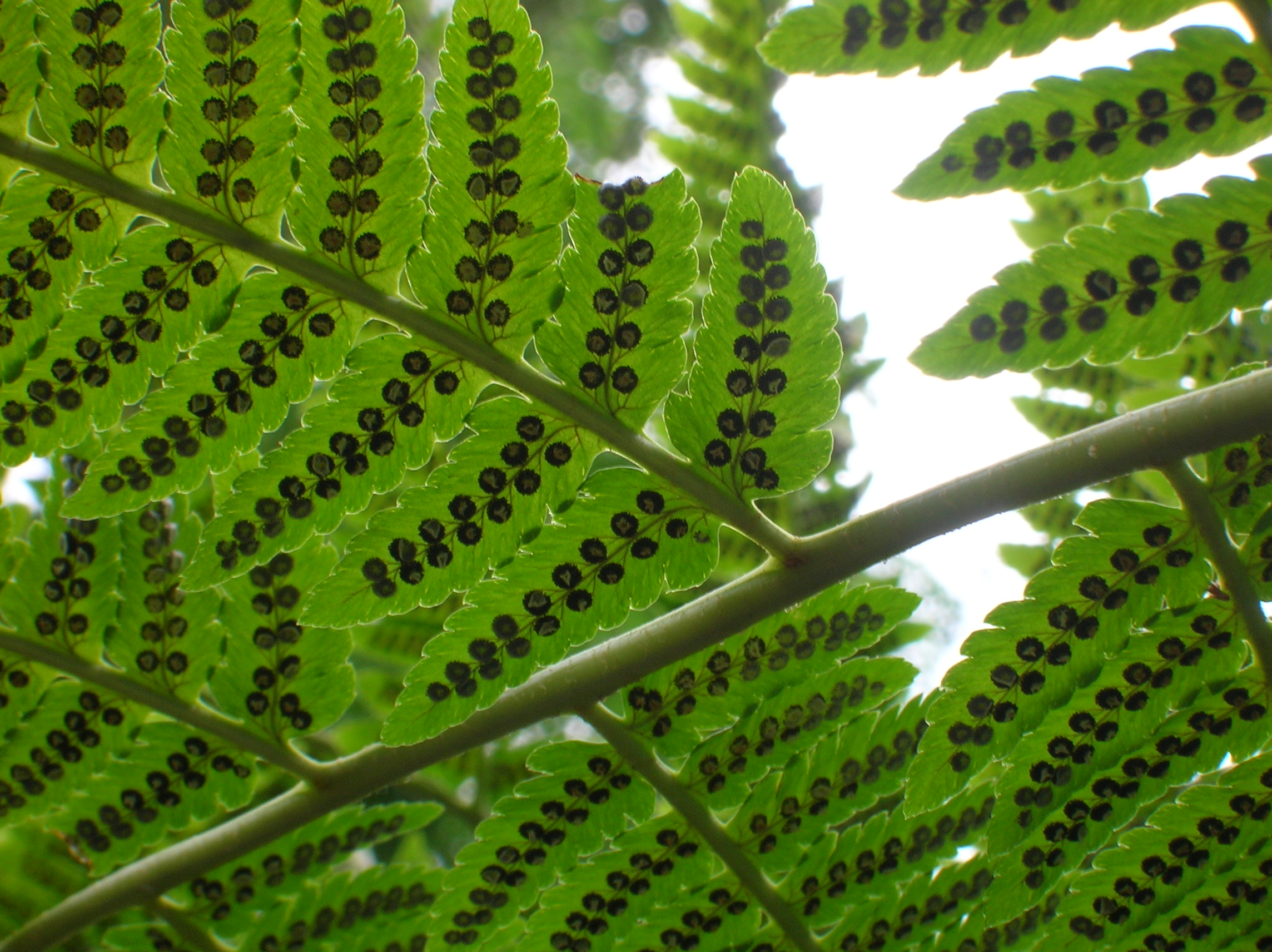
Dryopteris goldieana, Goldie's fern

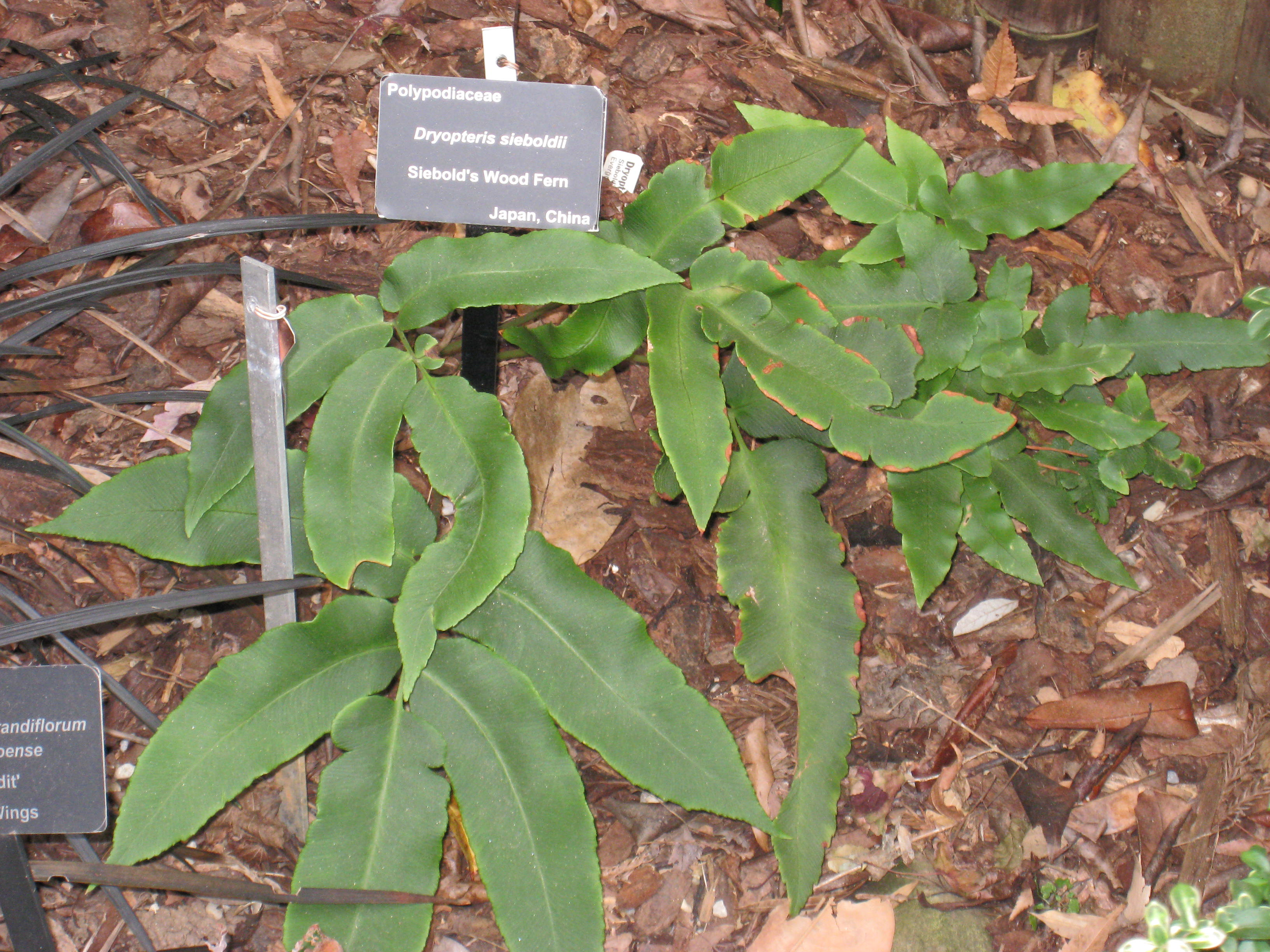
Dryopteris sieboldii

== Ecology ==
Dryopteris species are used as food plants by the larvae of some Lepidoptera species including Batrachedra sophroniella (which feeds exclusively on D. cyatheoides) and Sthenopiseauratus.

== Cultivation and uses ==
Many Dryopteris species are widely used as garden ornamental plants, especially D. affinis, D. erythrosora, and D. filix-mas, with numerous cultivars.

Dryopteris filix-mas was throughout much of recent human history widely used as a vermifuge, and was the only fern listed in the U.S. Pharmacopoeia. Traditional use in Scandinavia against red mite (Dermanyssus gallinae) infestation is to place fronds in nesting boxes under nesting material and under floor covering material.

== See also ==
- North American Dryopteris hybrid complex
