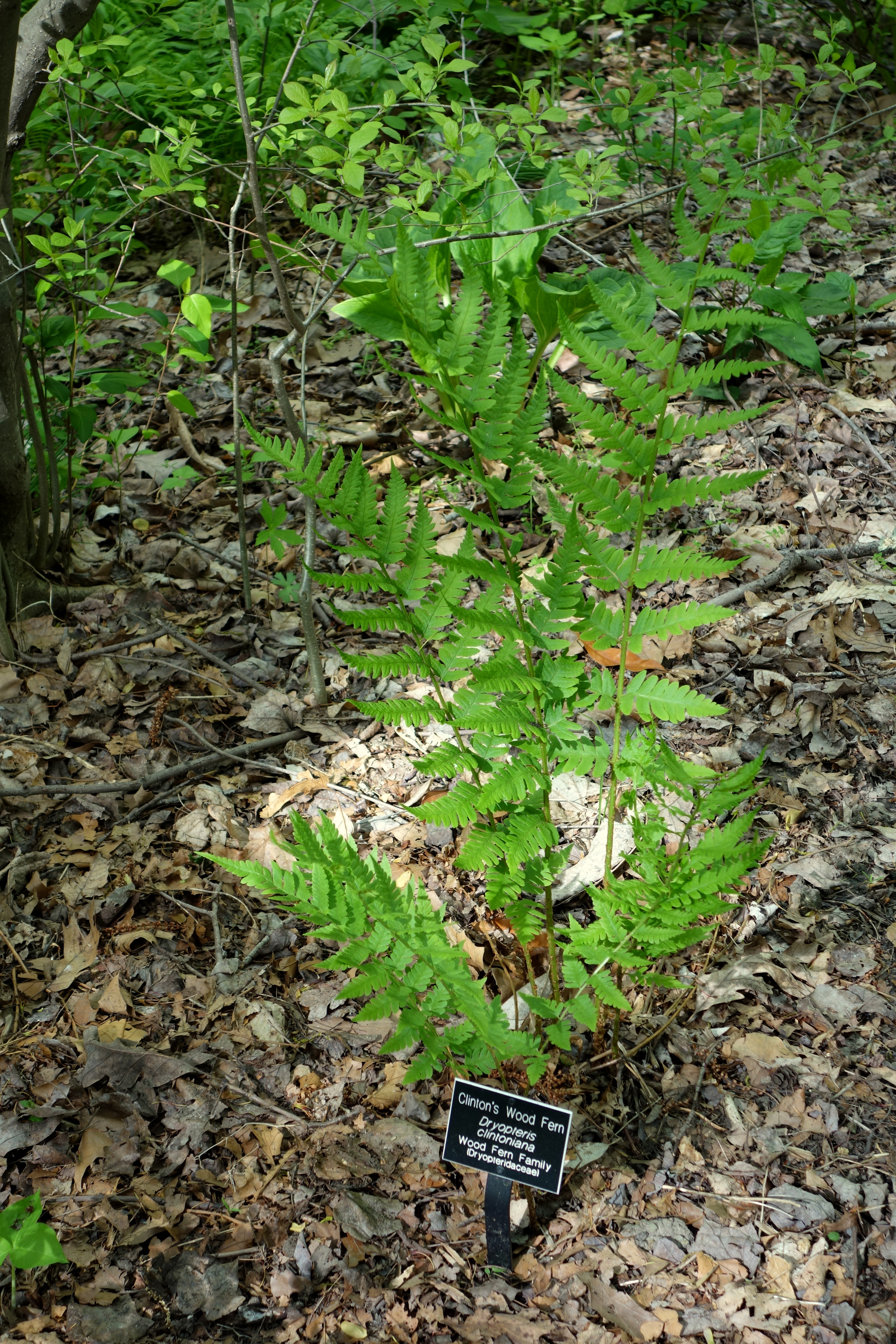

Conservation status
- Secure (NatureServe)

Scientific classification
- Kingdom: Plantae
- Clade: Tracheophytes
- Division: Polypodiophyta
- Class: Polypodiopsida
- Order: Polypodiales
- Suborder: Polypodiineae
- Family: Dryopteridaceae
- Genus: Dryopteris
- Species: D. clintoniana

Binomial name
- Dryopteris clintoniana (D.C. Eaton) Dowell

Synonyms
- List: Aspidium clintonianum Clute; Aspidium cristatum var. clintonianum D.C. Eaton; Dryopteris cristata var. clintoniana (D.C. Eaton) Underw.; Dryopteris X poyseri Wherry; Filix cristata var. clintoniana (D.C. Eaton) Farw.; Filix-mas cristata var. clintoniana (D.C. Eaton) Farw.; Nephrodium clintonianum Clute; Nephrodium cristatum var. clintonianum (D.C. Eaton) Gilbert; Thelypteris clintoniana (D.C. Eaton) House; Thelypteris cristata var. clintoniana (D.C. Eaton) Weath.

= Dryopteris clintoniana =

Species of fern

Dryopteris clintoniana, commonly known as Clinton's wood fern, is a fern of hybrid origin native to the northern hemisphere. It is a fertile hexaploid, arising as a species by doubling of its chromosome number from a hybrid between Dryopteris cristata, a tetraploid, and Dryopteris goldieana, a diploid. It is more northern in its range than either parent species.

This fern will be found in wet areas, similar to the habitat of D. cristata.
