= Dryopteris oreades =

Scientific classification
- Kingdom: Plantae
- Clade: Embryophytes
- Clade: Tracheophytes
- Division: Polypodiophyta
- Class: Polypodiopsida
- Order: Polypodiales
- Suborder: Polypodiineae
- Family: Dryopteridaceae
- Genus: Dryopteris
- Species: D. oreades

Binomial name
- Dryopteris oreades Fomin

Species of fern

Dryopteris oreades, commonly known as the mountain male-fern, is a species of Dryopteris woodfern native to the British Isles, western Europe, and western Asia.
