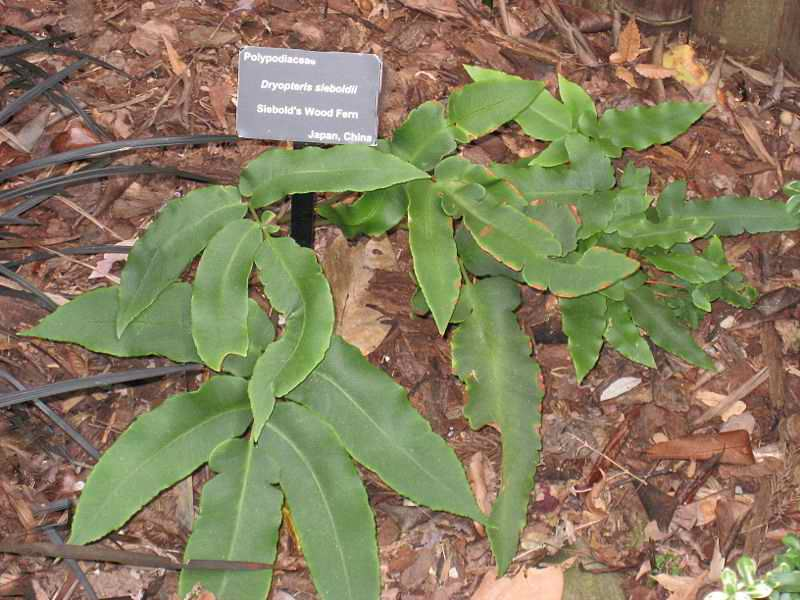
- At the Atlanta Botanical Garden

Scientific classification
- Kingdom: Plantae
- Clade: Tracheophytes
- Division: Polypodiophyta
- Class: Polypodiopsida
- Order: Polypodiales
- Suborder: Polypodiineae
- Family: Dryopteridaceae
- Genus: Dryopteris
- Species: D. sieboldii

Binomial name
- Dryopteris sieboldii (T.Moore) Kuntze

Synonyms
- Homotypic Synonyms: Lastrea sieboldii (T.Moore) T.Moore; Nephrodium sieboldii (T.Moore) Hook.; Polystichum sieboldii (T.Moore) Keyserl.; Pycnopteris sieboldii T.Moore; Heterotypic Synonyms: Lastrea podophylla J.Sm.; Aspidium podophyllum E.J.Lowe

= Dryopteris sieboldii =

Species of plant

Dryopteris sieboldii is a species of fern in the family Dryopteridaceae. It is native to Japan and south-central and southeast China. It has gained the Royal Horticultural Society's Award of Garden Merit as an ornamental.
