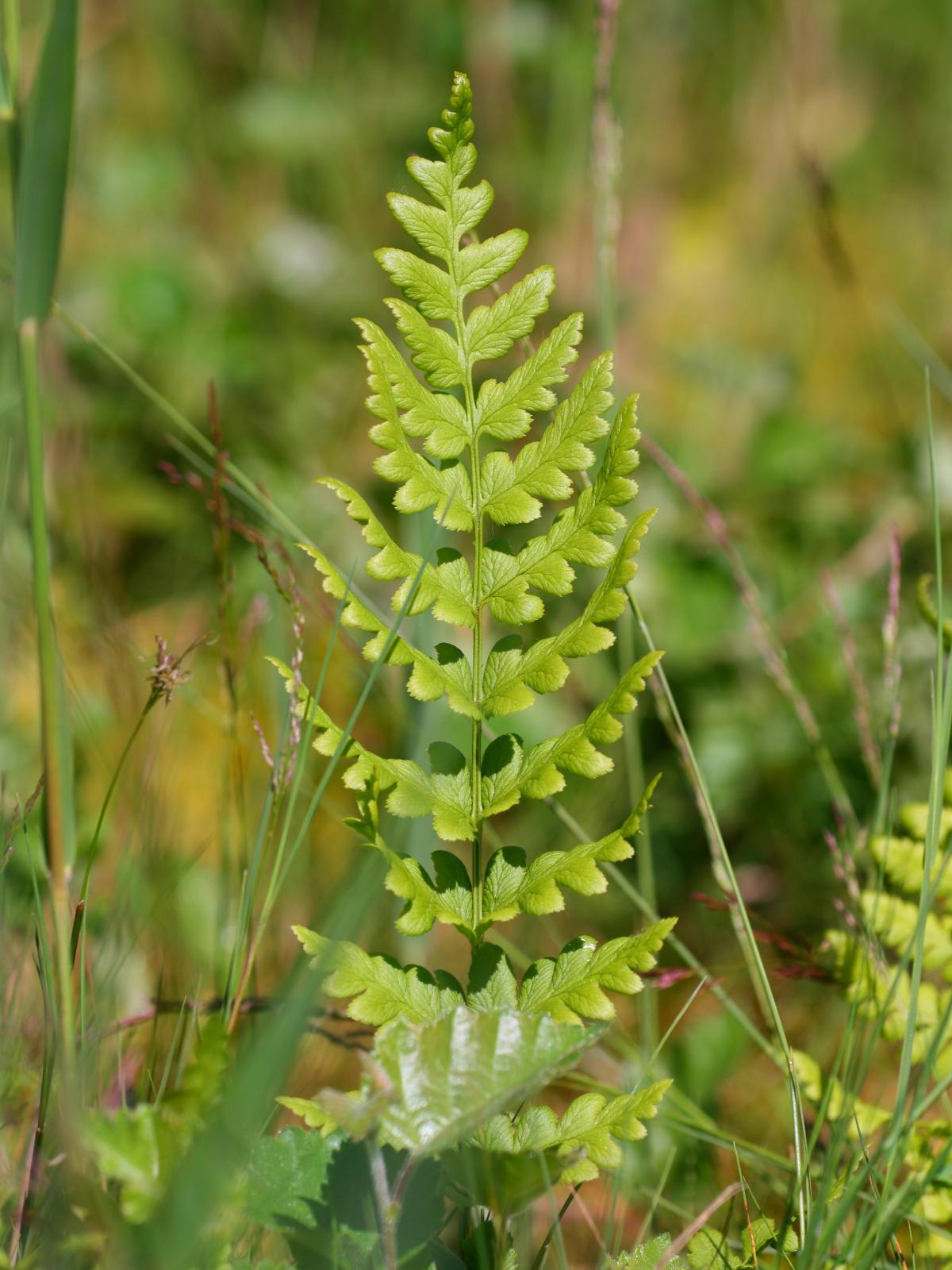

Conservation status
- Secure (NatureServe)

Scientific classification
- Kingdom: Plantae
- Clade: Tracheophytes
- Division: Polypodiophyta
- Class: Polypodiopsida
- Order: Polypodiales
- Suborder: Polypodiineae
- Family: Dryopteridaceae
- Genus: Dryopteris
- Species: D. cristata

Binomial name
- Dryopteris cristata (L.) A.Gray

Synonyms
- List: ? lancastriensis Spreng.; Acrostichum callipteris (Ehrh.) Ehrh.; Aspidium cristatum (L.) Sw.; Aspidium cristatum var. crenatum Christ; Aspidium lancastriense Spreng.; Asplenium lancastriensis Spreng.; Dryopteris affinis var. cristata (T.Moore) Fraser-Jenk.; Dryopteris cristata var. cristata (Linnaeus) A.Gray; Dryopteris cristata var. lancastriensis (Spreng.) Tidestr.; Dryopteris cristata var. mariana Tidestr.; Filix cristata (L.) Farw.; Filix-mas cristata (L.) Farw.; Lastrea callipteris (Ehrh.) Newman; Lastrea cristata (L.) C.Presl; Lastrea lancastriensis (Spreng.) J.Sm.; Lophodium callipteris (Ehrh.) Newman; Nephrodium cristatum (L.) Michx.; Nephrodium cristatum f. lancastriense (Spreng.) Gilbert; Nephrodium lancastriense (Spreng.) Desv.; Polypodium callipteris Ehrh.; Polypodium cristatum L.; Polystichum callipteris (Ehrh.) Bernh.; Polystichum cristatum (L.) Roth; Tectaria cristata (L.) Lag., Garcia & Clem.; Thelypteris cristata (L.) Nieuwl.

= Dryopteris cristata =

Species of fern

Dryopteris cristata is a perennial species of fern native to wetlands throughout the Northern Hemisphere. It is known as crested wood fern, crested buckler-fern or crested shieldfern. This plant is a tetraploid species of hybrid origin, one parent being Dryopteris ludoviciana and the other being the unknown, apparently extinct species, dubbed Dryopteris semicristata, which is also one of the presumed parents of Dryopteris carthusiana. D. cristata in turn is one of the parents of Dryopteris clintoniana, another fern of hybrid origin.

The crested wood fern is a wetland plant, needing year-round moisture. The fronds often grow quite tall, up to a meter or more in height, but are extremely narrow under most conditions.

This plant is toxic.

== Description ==
The plant is upright-ish, growing in leaf bunches, slightly leathery leaved and dark green. It has a short rootstock. The 20–30 cm leaves grow in upright sparse-ish bunches. The leaves without sporangium survive over winter. The leaf-stalk is about half the leaf blade with light-brown scales. The leaves with sporangium are longer with narrowly ovate leaf blades, usually only once bipinnate. The leaflets are ovate and pinnately lobed.

== Anti-microbial properties ==
It is known that this plant has been used as an anti-microbial agent; for example, root extracts from D. cristata (as well as the kindred species D. arguta) has been shown efficacious in expelling intestinal parasites from certain mammals.
