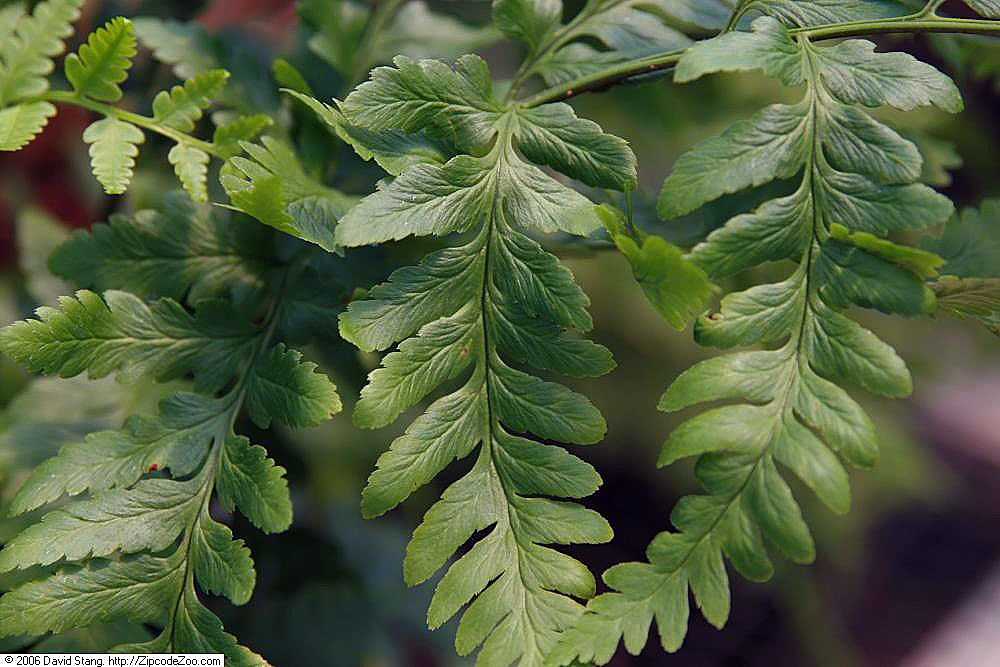

Conservation status
- Apparently Secure (NatureServe)

Scientific classification
- Kingdom: Plantae
- Clade: Tracheophytes
- Division: Polypodiophyta
- Class: Polypodiopsida
- Order: Polypodiales
- Suborder: Polypodiineae
- Family: Dryopteridaceae
- Genus: Dryopteris
- Species: D. celsa

Binomial name
- Dryopteris celsa (Wm. Palmer) Knowlt., Palmer & Pollard ex Small

Synonyms
- Dryopteris wherryi

= Dryopteris celsa =

Species of fern

Dryopteris celsa, the log fern, is a perennial fern in the family Dryopteridaceae. It naturally occurs on rotting logs and the rich soil of swamps and wet woodlands. Its native range includes the southeastern United States.
