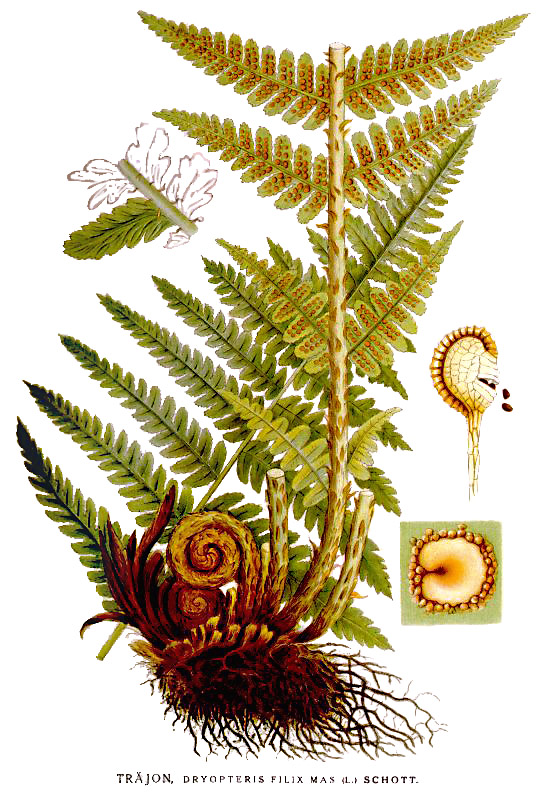

Conservation status
- Secure (NatureServe)

Scientific classification
- Kingdom: Plantae
- Clade: Tracheophytes
- Division: Polypodiophyta
- Class: Polypodiopsida
- Order: Polypodiales
- Suborder: Polypodiineae
- Family: Dryopteridaceae
- Genus: Dryopteris
- Species: D. filix-mas

Binomial name
- Dryopteris filix-mas (L.) Schott

= Dryopteris filix-mas =

Species of fern in the wood fern family

Dryopteris filix-mas, the male fern, is a common fern of the temperate Northern Hemisphere, native to much of Europe, Asia, and North America. It favours damp shaded areas in the understory of woodlands, but also shady places on hedge-banks, and rocks, and screes. Near the northern limit of its distribution it prefers sunny, well-drained sites. It is much less abundant in North America than in Europe.

== Description ==
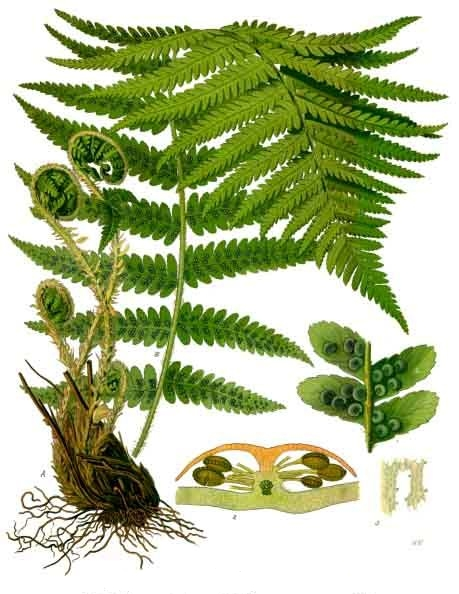
19th century illustration

The semi-evergreen leaves have an upright habit and reach a maximum length of 150 cm (59 in), with a single crown on each rootstock. The bipinnate leaves consist of 20–35 pinnae on each side of the rachis. The leaves taper at both ends, with the basal pinnae about half the length of the middle pinnae. The pinules are rather blunt and equally lobed all around. The stalks are covered with orange-brown scales. On the abaxial surface of the mature blade five or six sori develop in two rows. When the spores ripen in August to November, the indusium starts to shrivel, leading to the release of the spores.

This species hybridises easily with Dryopteris affinis (scaly male fern) and Dryopteris oreades (mountain male fern).

== Names ==
The plant is sometimes referred to in ancient literature as worm fern, reflecting its former use against tapeworm.

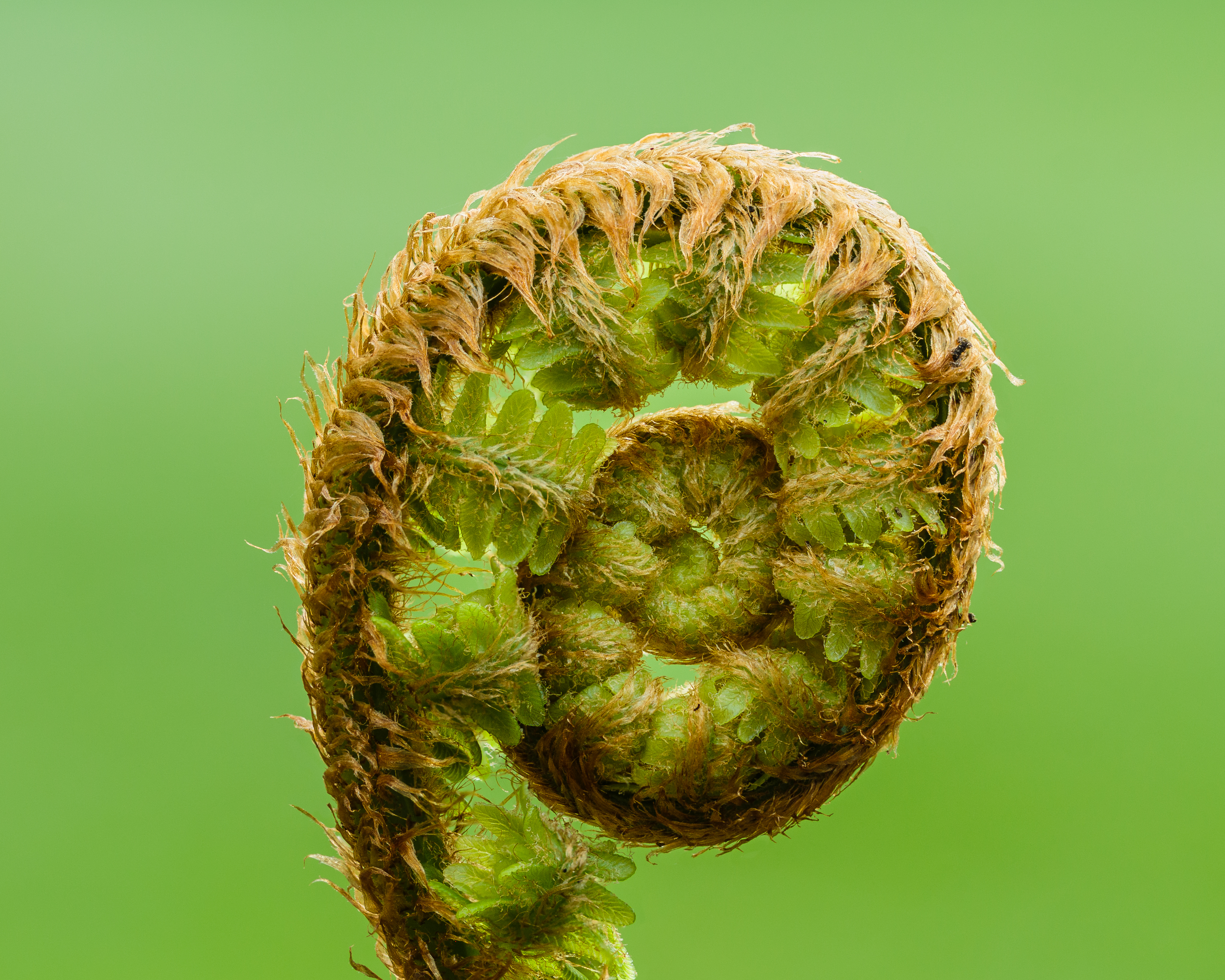
Unrolling leaf of a Dryopteris filix-mas.

Its specific epithet filix-mas means "male fern" (filix "fern", mas "male"), as the plant was thought to be the male version of the common lady fern Athyrium filix-femina. being robust in appearance and vigorous in growth.

The Finnish name kivikkoalvejuuri refers to the anti-cestoda (tapeworm) medical use it has had (see Culture section), as alve is an old word for cestoda.

== Cultivation and uses ==
Numerous cultivars have been selected for garden use. The following have gained the Royal Horticultural Society's Award of Garden Merit:

- D. filix-mas
- 'Crispa Cristata'
- 'Cristata'
- 'Grandiceps Wills'
- 'Linearis Polydactyla'

== Culture ==
D. filix-mas is culturally named the title plant of Nurmijärvi, the municipality in Uusimaa, Finland. The reason is that the plant is related to the first Finnish pharmaceutical factory located in Nurmijärvi in 1899–1964. The pharmaceutical factory founded by the pharmacist Albin Koponen made Diphyllobothrium latum and cestoda medicines called Filisin and Filicon, the raw material of which was the rhizome of D. filix-mas. The rhizomes were still collected in the locality in the 1960s. The medicine was also used to treat liver fluke in sheep in Finland.

== Toxicity ==
The rhizomes of D. filix-mas are toxic. Doses too big can cause serious poisoning, blindness and even death.
