= List of Dryopteris species =

Dryopteris (wood fern) is a genus of ferns in the family Dryopteridaceae. They are found worldwide.

As of October 2026, the Checklist of Ferns and Lycophytes of the World recognized 354 species and 93 hybrids.

== Species ==
=== A ===
- Dryopteris acutissima H.J.Wei & Z.Y.Zuo
- Dryopteris acutodentata Ching
- Dryopteris adnata (Blume) Alderw.
- Dryopteris aemula (Aiton) Kuntze – hay-scented buckler fern
- Dryopteris affinis (Lowe) Fraser-Jenk. – scaly male fern
- Dryopteris aitoniana Pic.Serm.
- Dryopteris alpestris Tagawa
- Dryopteris alpina Rosenst.
- Dryopteris amblyodonta J.P.Roux
- Dryopteris amurensis (Milde) Christ
- Dryoperis anadroma, nom. nud.
- Dryopteris aneitensis (Hook.) C.Chr.
- Dryopteris angustifrons (T.Moore) Kuntze
- Dryopteris angustipalea Darnaedi, M.Kato & K.Iwats.
- Dryopteris annamensis (Tagawa) Li Bing Zhang
- Dryopteris antarctica (Baker) C.Chr.
- Dryopteris anthracinisquama Miyam.
- Dryopteris apiciflora (Wall. ex Mett.) Kuntze
- Dryopteris approximata Sledge
- Dryopteris aquilinoides (Desv.) C.Chr.
- Dryopteris arborescens (Baker) Kuntze
- Dryopteris ardechensis Fraser-Jenk.
- Dryopteris arguta (Kaulf.) Watt – coastal wood fern
- Dryopteris arunachalensis (Fraser-Jenk. & Benniamin) R.Kr.Singh & V.K.Rawat
- Dryopteris ascensionis (Hook.) Kuntze
- Dryopteris assamensis (C.Hope) C.Chr. & Ching
- Dryopteris athamantica (Kunze) Kuntze
- Dryopteris atrata (Wall. ex Kunze) Ching
- Dryopteris aurantiaca J.P.Roux
- Dryopteris austroindica Fraser-Jenk.

=== B ===
- Dryopteris bamleriana Rosenst.
- Dryopteris barbigera (Hook.) Kuntze
- Dryopteris basisora Christ
- Dryopteris bernieri Tardieu
- Dryopteris bhutanica (Fraser-Jenk. & Pariyar) Fraser-Jenk.
- Dryopteris bissetiana (Baker) C.Chr.
- Dryopteris blandfordii (C.Hope) C.Chr.
- Dryopteris bodinieri (Christ) C.Chr.
- Dryopteris bojeri Kuntze
- Dryopteris borreri (Newman) Oberh. & Tavel

=== C ===
- Dryopteris cacaina Tagawa
- Dryopteris calciphila N.T.Lu, Li Bing Zhang & Liang Zhang
- Dryopteris cambrensis (Fraser-Jenk.) Beitel & W.R.Buck
- Dryopteris campyloptera Clarkson – mountain wood fern
- Dryopteris camusiae Fraser-Jenk.
- Dryopteris caperata J.P.Roux
- Dryopteris caroli-hopei Fraser-Jenk.
- Dryopteris carpatica S.Jess. & Bujnoch
- Dryopteris carthusiana (Vill.) H.P.Fuchs – narrow buckler fern
- Dryopteris caucasica (A.Braun) Fraser-Jenk. & Corley
- Dryopteris caudipinna Nakai
- Dryopteris celsa (W.Palmer) Knowlt., T.S.Palmer & Pollard ex Small – log fern
- Dryopteris chaerophyllifolia (Zippel) C.Chr.
- Dryopteris championii (Benth.) C.Chr.
- Dryopteris chinensis (Baker) Koidz.
- Dryopteris christenseniae (Ching) Li Bing Zhang
- Dryopteris chrysocoma (Christ) C.Chr.
- Dryopteris cicatricata J.P.Roux
- Dryopteris cinnamomea (Cav.) C.Chr. – cinnamon wood fern
- Dryopteris clarkei (Baker) Kuntze
- Dryopteris clintoniana (D.C.Eaton) Dowell – Clinton's wood fern
- Dryopteris cochleata (D.Don) C.Chr.
- Dryopteris cognata (C.Presl) Kuntze
- Dryopteris commixta Tagawa
- Dryopteris comorensis (Tardieu) Fraser-Jenk.
- Dryopteris conjugata Ching
- Dryopteris conversa Alderw.
- Dryopteris corleyi Fraser-Jenk.
- Dryopteris costalisora Tagawa
- Dryopteris crassirhizoma Nakai
- Dryopteris crinalis (Hook. & Arn.) C.Chr.
- Dryopteris crispifolia Rasbach, Reichst. & G.Vida
- Dryopteris cristata (L.) A.Gray – crested buckler fern
- Dryopteris cycadina Franch. & Sav.) C.Chr.
- Dryopteris cyclopeltidiformis C.Chr.

=== D ===
- Dryopteris damingshanensis Li Bing Zhang & H.M.Liu
- Dryopteris daozhenensis P.S.Wang & X.Y.Wang
- Dryopteris decipiens (Hook.) Kuntze
- Dryopteris dehuaensis Ching & K.H.Shing
- Dryopteris deparioides (T.Moore) Kuntze
- Dryopteris devriesei Rosenst.
- Dryopteris diacalpioides (Ching) Li Bing Zhang
- Dryopteris dibangensis C.Chanda & Fraser-Jenk.
- Dryopteris dickinsii (Franch. & Sav.) C.Chr.
- Dryopteris dicksonioides (Mett.) Copel.
- Dryopteris diffracta (Baker) C.Chr.
- Dryopteris dilatata (Hoffm.) A.Gray – broad buckler fern
- Dryopteris dracomontana Schelpe & N.C.Anthony
- Dryopteris drakei C.Chr.
- Dryopteris dulongensis (S.K.Wu & X.Cheng) Li Bing Zhang

=== E ===
- Dryopteris edwardsii Fraser-Jenk.
- Dryopteris enneaphylla (Baker) C.Chr.
- Dryopteris erythrosora (D.C.Eaton) Kuntze – autumn fern
- Dryopteris erythrovaria K.Hori & N.Murak.
- Dryopteris esterhuyseniae Schelpe & N.C.Anthony
- Dryopteris expansa (C.Presl) Fraser-Jenk. & Jermy – northern buckler fern

=== F ===
- Dryopteris fadenii Pic.Serm.
- Dryopteris fangii Ching, Fraser-Jenk. & Z.R.Wang
- Dryopteris fatuhivensis E.D.Br.
- Dryopteris ferruginea (Baker) Kuntze
- Dryopteris filipaleata J.P.Roux
- Dryopteris filix-mas (L.) Schott – male fern
- Dryopteris flaccisquama A.Rojas
- Dryopteris flemingii Fraser-Jenk.
- Dryopteris formosana (Christ) C.Chr.
- Dryopteris fragrans (L.) Schott – fragrant buckler fern, fragrant wood fern
- Dryopteris fragrantiformis Tzvelev
- Dryopteris fructuosa (Christ) C.Chr.
- Dryopteris fuscipes C.Chr.
- Dryopteris fuscoatra (Hillebr.) W.J.Rob.
- Dryopteris futura A.R.Sm.

=== G ===
- Dryopteris gamblei (C.Hope) C.Chr.
- Dryopteris gaoligongensis Z.Y.Zuo, J.Mei Lu & D.Z.Li
- Dryopteris gemmifera S.Y.Dong
- Dryopteris glabra (Brack.) Kuntze
- Dryopteris glandulosopaleata J.P.Roux
- Dryopteris goerigiana (Kunze) Koidz.
- Dryopteris goldieana (Hook. ex Goldie) A.Gray – Goldie's wood fern
- Dryopteris gonggaensis H.S.Kung, Li Bing Zhang & X.S.Guo
- Dryopteris gorgonea J.P.Roux
- Dryopteris grandifrons Li Bing Zhang
- Dryopteris guanchica Gibby & Jermy
- Dryopteris guangxiensis S.G.Lu
- Dryopteris gymnophylla (Baker) C.Chr.
- Dryopteris gymnosora (Makino) C.Chr.

=== H ===
- Dryopteris habaensis Ching
- Dryopteris hadanoi Sa.Kurata
- Dryopteris handeliana C.Chr.
- Dryopteris hangchowensis Ching
- Dryopteris hasseltii (Blume) C.Chr.
- Dryopteris hawaiiensis (Hillebr.) W.J.Rob.
- Dryopteris hendersonii (Bedd.) C.Chr.
- Dryopteris herbacea Alderw.
- Dryopteris heterolaena C.Chr.
- Dryopteris hezhangensis P.S.Wang
- Dryopteris himachalensis Fraser-Jenk.
- Dryopteris hirtipes (Blume) Kuntze
- Dryopteris hondoensis Koidz.
- Dryopteris huberi C.Chr.
- Dryopteris huongii C.W.Chen
- Dryopteris hypolepioides Rosenst.

=== I ===
- Dryopteris immixta Ching
- Dryopteris inaequalis (Schltdl.) Kuntze
- Dryopteris indonesiana Darnaedi, M.Kato & K.Iwats.
- Dryopteris indusiata Makino & Yamam.
- Dryopteris insularis Kodama
- Dryopteris integriloba C.Chr.
- Dryopteris intermedia A.Gray – intermediate wood fern
- Dryopteris inuyamensis H.Itô
- Dryopteris iranica Fraser-Jenk.

=== J ===
- Dryopteris jinpingensis Z.Y.Zuo, J.Mei Lu & D.Z.Li
- Dryopteris jishouensis G.X.Chen & D.G.Zhang
- Dryopteris jiucaipingensis P.S.Wang, Q.Luo & Li Bing Zhang
- Dryopteris juxtaposita Christ

=== K ===
- Dryopteris karwinskyana Kuntze
- Dryopteris kashmiriana Fraser-Jenk. & Widén
- Dryopteris katangaensis J.P.Roux
- Dryopteris kawakamii Hayata
- Dryopteris khullarii Fraser-Jenk.
- Dryopteris kilemensis (Kuhn) Kuntze
- Dryopteris kinkiensis Koidz. ex Tagawa
- Dryopteris kinokuniensis Sa.Kurata
- Dryopteris knoblochii A.R.Sm.
- Dryopteris koidzumiana Tagawa
- Dryopteris komarovii Kossinsky
- Dryopteris kwanzanensis Tagawa

=== L ===
- Dryopteris labordei (Christ) C.Chr.
- Dryopteris lacera (Thunb.) Kuntze
- Dryopteris lachoongensis (Bedd.) B.K.Nayar & Kaur
- Dryopteris lacunosa S.Jess., Zenner, Chr.Stark & Bujnoch
- Dryopteris laeta (Kom.) C.Chr.
- Dryopteris lepidopoda Hayata
- Dryopteris lepidorachis C.Chr.
- Dryopteris lepinei (Kuhn) Kuntze
- Dryopteris leucorhachis (Cheeseman) C.Chr.
- Dryopteris lewalleana Pic.Serm.
- Dryopteris liankwangensis Ching
- Dryopteris liboensis P.S.Wang, X.Y.Wang & Li Bing Zhang
- Dryopteris lijianxiui Xiao J.Li
- Dryopteris loxoscaphoides (Baker) C.Chr.
- Dryopteris ludoviciana (Kunze) Small – southern wood fern
- Dryopteris lunanensis (Christ) C.Chr.
- Dryopteris lustrata C.Chr.

=== M ===
- Dryopteris macrochlamys (Fée) Fraser-Jenk.
- Dryopteris macrolepidota Copel.
- Dryopteris macropholis Lorence & W.L.Wagner
- Dryopteris manipurensis (Bedd.) C.Chr.
- Dryopteris manniana (Hook.) C.Chr.
- Dryopteris marginalis (L.) A.Gray – marginal wood fern
- Dryopteris marginata (C.B.Clarke) Christ
- Dryopteris mauiensis C.Chr.
- Dryopteris maxima (Baker) C.Chr.
- Dryopteris maximowicziana (Miq.) C.Chr.
- Dryopteris maximowiczii (Baker) Kuntze
- Dryopteris maxonii Underw. & C.Chr.
- Dryopteris meghalaica Fraser-Jenk. & Gibby
- Dryopteris melanocarpa Hayata
- Dryopteris mengshanensis J.X.Li & Xiao J.Li
- Dryopteris microlepis (Baker) C.Chr.
- Dryopteris mindshelkensis Pavlov – rigid buckler fern
- Dryopteris minor Z.Y.Zuo, S.Y.Dong & D.Z.Li
- Dryopteris monticola (Makino) C.Chr.
- Dryopteris montigena Ching
- Dryopteris munchii A.R.Sm.

=== N ===
- Dryopteris namegatae (Sa.Kurata) Sa.Kurata
- Dryopteris napoleonis (Bory) Kuntze
- Dryopteris nidus (Baker) Li Bing Zhang
- Dryopteris nigropaleacea (Fraser-Jenk.) Fraser-Jenk.
- Dryopteris ningqiangensis Z.Y.Zuo & J.Q.Tang
- Dryopteris nipponensis Koidz.
- Dryopteris nobilis Ching, nom. illeg.
- Dryopteris nodosa (C.Presl) Li Bing Zhang
- Dryopteris nubigena Maxon & C.V.Morton
- Dryopteris nyingchiensis Ching

=== O ===
- Dryopteris obtusiloba (Baker) Kuntze
- Dryopteris obtusipinnula (Fraser-Jenk.) Fraser-Jenk.
- Dryopteris occidentalis J.P.Roux
- Dryopteris odontoloma (T.Moore ex Bedd.) C.Chr.
- Dryopteris oligodonta (Desv.) Pic.Serm.
- Dryopteris oreades Fomin – mountain male fern

=== P ===
- Dryopteris paleolata (Pic.Serm.) Li Bing Zhang
- Dryopteris pallida (Bory) Maire & Petitm.
- Dryopteris panda (C.B.Clarke) C.Chr.
- Dryopteris paomowanensis Ching & Z.Y.Liu
- Dryopteris papuae-novae-guineae Li Bing Zhang
- Dryopteris papuana C.Chr.
- Dryopteris parabissetiana H.J.Wei & Z.Y.Zuo
- Dryopteris patula (Sw.) Underw.
- Dryopteris paucisora Copel.
- Dryopteris pauliae Fraser-Jenk., Widén & Gibby
- Dryopteris peninsulae Kitag.
- Dryopteris pentheri (Krasser) C.Chr.
- Dryopteris peranema Li Bing Zhang
- Dryopteris permagna M.G.Price
- Dryopteris podophylla (Hook.) Kuntze
- Dryopteris poilanei Tardieu
- Dryopteris polita Rosenst.
- Dryopteris polylepis (Franch. & Sav.) C.Chr.
- Dryopteris pontica (Fraser-Jenk.) Fraser-Jenk.
- Dryopteris porosa Ching
- Dryopteris protobissetiana K.Hori & N.Murak.
- Dryopteris pseudocaenopteris (Kunze) Li Bing Zhang
- Dryopteris pseudocomplexa (Fraser-Jenk.) P.D.Sell
- Dryopteris pseudodisjuncta (Tavel ex Fraser-Jenk.) Fraser-Jenk.
- Dryopteris pseudofilix-mas (Fée) Rothm.
- Dryopteris pseudolunanensis Tagawa
- Dryopteris pseudomas (Woll.) Holub & Pouzar
- Dryopteris pseudoparasitica Alderw.
- Dryopteris pseudosieboldii Hayata
- Dryopteris pseudosparsa Ching
- Dryopteris pulvinulifera (Bedd.) Kuntze
- Dryopteris purpurascens Christ
- Dryopteris pycnolepis Z.Y.Zuo & S.Y.Dong
- Dryopteris pycnopteroides (Christ) C.Chr.

=== R ===
- Dryopteris raddeana (Fomin) Fomin
- Dryopteris raiateensis (J.W.Moore) Li Bing Zhang
- Dryopteris ramosa (C.Hope) C.Chr.
- Dryopteris redactopinnata Soumen K.Basu & Panigrahi
- Dryopteris reflexosquamata Hayata
- Dryopteris remota (A.Braun ex Doll) Druce – scaly buckler fern
- Dryopteris remotissima (Christ) Koidz.
- Dryopteris renchangiana Z.Y.Zuo & D.Z.Li
- Dryopteris rhomboideo-ovata H.Itô
- Dryopteris rodolfii J.P.Roux
- Dryopteris rossii C.Chr.
- Dryopteris rosthornii (Diels) C.Chr.
- Dryopteris rubiginosa (Brack.) Kuntze
- Dryopteris rubrobrunnea W.M.Chu
- Dryopteris ruwenzoriensis C.Chr. ex Fraser-Jenk.
- Dryopteris ryo-itoana Sa.Kurata

=== S ===
- Dryopteris sabaei (Franch. & Sav.) C.Chr.
- Dryopteris sacrosancta Koidz.
- Dryopteris saffordii C.Chr.
- Dryopteris sandwicensis (Hook. & Arn.) C.Chr.
- Dryopteris saxifraga H.Itô
- Dryopteris saxifragivaria Nakai
- Dryopteris scabrosa (Kunze) Kuntze
- Dryopteris schimperiana (Hochst.) C.Chr.
- Dryopteris schizopaleata Eb.Fisch. & Lobin
- Dryopteris schorapanensis Askerov
- Dryopteris schnellii Tardieu
- Dryopteris scottii (Bedd.) Ching
- Dryopteris sericea C.Chr.
- Dryopteris serratodentata (Bedd.) Hayata
- Dryopteris shiakeana H.Shang & Y.H.Yan
- Dryopteris shikokiana (Makino) C.Chr.
- Dryopteris shiroumensis Sa.Kurata & Nakam.
- Dryopteris sichotensis Kom.
- Dryopteris sieboldii (T.Moore) Kuntze
- Dryopteris sikkimensis (Bedd.) Kuntze
- Dryopteris simasakii (H.Itô) Sa.Kurata
- Dryopteris sinonepalensis Z.Y.Zuo & Fraser-Jenk.
- Dryopteris sledgei Fraser-Jenk.
- Dryopteris songyinghuensis J.X.Li & Xiao J.Li
- Dryopteris sordidipes Tagawa
- Dryopteris sororia (Maxon) M.A.McHenry, Sundue & Barrington
- Dryopteris sparsa (D.Don) Kuntze
- Dryopteris speciosissima Copel.
- Dryopteris sphaeropteroides (Baker) C.Chr.
- Dryopteris splendens (Desv.) Kuntze
- Dryopteris squamiseta (Hook.) Kuntze
- Dryopteris stenolepis (Baker) C.Chr.
- Dryopteris stewartii Fraser-Jenk.
- Dryopteris subarborea (Baker) C.Chr.
- Dryopteris subatrata Tagawa
- Dryopteris subbipinnata W.H.Wagner & R.W.Hobdy
- Dryopteris subcochleata Fraser-Jenk. & Khatri Chhetri
- Dryopteris subexaltata (Christ) C.Chr.
- Dryopteris subhikonensis K.Hori & N.Murak.
- Dryopteris subimpressa Loyal
- Dryopteris sublacera Christ
- Dryopteris submarginata Rosenst.
- Dryopteris subpycnopteroides Ching ex Fraser-Jenk.
- Dryopteris subtriangularis (C.Hope) C.Chr.
- Dryopteris subtsushimensis K.Hori & N.Murak.
- Dryopteris sukungiana Z.Y.Zuo
- Dryopteris sweetiorum Lorence & W.L.Wagner

=== T ===
- Dryopteris tahmingensis Ching
- Dryopteris takeuchiana Koidz.
- Dryopteris tenuicula C.G.Matthew & Christ
- Dryopteris tenuipes (Rosenst.) Seriz.
- Dryopteris tetrapinnata W.H.Wagner & Hobdy
- Dryopteris tingiensis Ching & S.K.Wu ex Fraser-Jenk.
- Dryopteris tokyoensis (Makino) C.Chr. – Tokyo wood fern
- Dryopteris toyamae Tagawa
- Dryopteris transmorrisonensis (Hayata) Hayata
- Dryopteris tricellularis J.P.Roux
- Dryopteris tsoongii Ching
- Dryopteris tsugiwoi Sa.Kurata
- Dryopteris tsushimensis K.Hori & N.Murak.
- Dryopteris tsutsuiana Sa.Kurata
- Dryopteris tyrrhena Fraser-Jenk. & Reichst

=== U, V ===
- Dryopteris unidentata (Hook. & Arn.) C.Chr.
- Dryopteris uniformis (Makino) Makino
- Dryopteris varia (L.) Kuntze
- Dryopteris vescoi (Drake) C.Chr.
- Dryopteris vidyae Fraser-Jenk.
- Dryopteris villarii (Bellardi) Woyn.

=== W ===
- Dryopteris wallichiana (Spreng.) Hyl. – alpine wood fern
- Dryopteris wardii (Baker) Kuntze
- Dryopteris wattsii M.McKeown, Sundue & Barrington
- Dryopteris whangshangensis Ching
- Dryopteris wideniana Fraser-Jenk.
- Dryopteris woodsiisora Hayata
- Dryopteris wulingshanensis J.P.Shu, Y.H.Yan & R.J.Wang
- Dryopteris wuyishanica Ching & P.C.Chiu
- Dryopteris wuzhaohongii Li Bing Zhang

=== X, Y, Z ===
- Dryopteris xanthomelas (Christ) C.Chr.
- Dryopteris xunwuensis Ching & K.H.Shing
- Dryopteris yigongensis Ching
- Dryopteris yongdeensis W.M.Chu ex S.G.Lu
- Dryopteris yoroii Seriz.
- Dryopteris zayuensis Ching & S.K.Wu
- Dryopteris zhenfengensis P.S.Wang & X.Y.Wang

== Hybrids ==
=== A ===
- Dryopteris × alejandrei Pérez Carro & Fern.Areces
- Dryopteris × algonquinensis D.M.Britton
- Dryopteris × alpirsbachensis Freigang, Zenner, Bujnoch, S.Jess. & Magauer
- Dryopteris × ambroseae Fraser-Jenk. & Jermy
- Dryopteris × apuana Gibby, S.Jess. & Marchetti
- Dryopteris × arecesiae Pérez Carro & T.E.Díaz
- Dryopteris × asturiensis Fraser-Jenk. & Gibby
- Dryopteris × australis (Wherry) Small

=== B ===
- Dryopteris × benedictii (Farw.) Wherry
- Dryopteris × boottii (Tuck.) Underw.
- Dryopteris × borbasii Litard.
- Dryopteris × brathaica Fraser-Jenk. & Reichst.
- Dryopteris × burgessii B.Boivin

=== C ===
- Dryopteris × cantabrica Alejandre, Pérez Carro & Fern.Areces
- Dryopteris × cedroensis Gibby & Widén
- Dryopteris × complanata Fraser-Jenk.
- Dryopteris × complexa Fraser-Jenk.
- Dryopteris × correllii W.H.Wagner & A.V.Gilman
- Dryopteris × cressleri ined.
- Dryopteris × critica (Fraser-Jenk.) Fraser-Jenk.

=== D ===
- Dryopteris × deweveri (Jansen) Jansen & Wachter
- Dryopteris × doeppii Rothm.
- Dryopteris × doluchanovii Askerov
- Dryopteris × dowellii (Farw.) Wherry

=== E, F, G ===
- Dryopteris × euxinensis Fraser-Jenk. & Corley
- Dryopteris × fraser-jenkinsii Gibby & Widén
- Dryopteris × fujipedis Sa.Kurata
- Dryopteris × furadensis Bennert, Rasbach, K.Rasbach & Viane
- Dryopteris × ghatakii Fraser-Jenk.
- Dryopteris × gomerica Gibby & Widén
- Dryopteris × gotenbaensis Nakaike
- Dryopteris × graeca Fraser-Jenk. & Gibby

=== H, I, K ===
- Dryopteris × haganecola Sa.Kurata
- Dryopteris × hakonecola Sa.Kurata
- Dryopteris × hisatsuana Sa.Kurata
- Dryopteris × holttumii Li Bing Zhang
- Dryopteris × initialis Fraser-Jenk. & Corley
- Dryopteris × kominatoensis Tagawa
- Dryopteris × kouzaii Akasawa

=== L ===
- Dryopteris × lawalreei Janch.
- Dryopteris × leedsii Wherry
- Dryopteris × liddarensis Fraser-Jenk.
- Dryopteris × ligustica Gibby, S.Jess. & Marchetti
- Dryopteris × litardierei Rothm.
- Dryopteris × loyalii Fraser-Jenk.

=== M ===
- Dryopteris × macdonellii Fraser-Jenk.
- Dryopteris × madalenae Fraser-Jenk.
- Dryopteris × makabensis Kaor.Yamam. & N.Murak.
- Dryopteris × mantoniae Fraser-Jenk. & Corley
- Dryopteris × martinsiae Fraser-Jenk.
- Dryopteris × mayebarae Tagawa
- Dryopteris × mickelii J.H.Peck
- Dryopteris × mituii Seriz.
- Dryopteris × miyazakiensis Miyam.
- Dryopteris × montgomeryi Fraser-Jenk. & Widén

=== N, O, P, R ===
- Dryopteris × neowherryi W.H.Wagner
- Dryopteris × orexpansa Pérez Carro & Fern.Areces
- Dryopteris × otomasui Sa.Kurata
- Dryopteris × picoensis Fraser-Jenk. & Gibby
- Dryopteris × pittsfordensis Sloss.
- Dryopteris × pseudoabbreviata Jermy
- Dryopteris × pseudocommixta Sa.Kurata
- Dryopteris × pseudohangchowensis Miyam.
- Dryopteris × pteridiiformis Christ
- Dryopteris × rarissima Sa.Kurata
- Dryopteris × ronald-vianensis Pérez Carro & Fern.Areces

=== S ===
- Dryopteris × sardoa Fraser-Jenk., Reichst
- Dryopteris × sarvelae Fraser-Jenk. & Jermy
- Dryopteris × satsumana Sa.Kurata
- Dryopteris × separabilis Small
- Dryopteris × shibipedis Sa.Kurata
- Dryopteris × shibisanensis Sa.Kurata
- Dryopteris × sjoegrenii Fraser-Jenk.
- Dryopteris × slossoniae Wherry ex Lellinger
- Dryopteris × subaustriaca Rothm.
- Dryopteris × subdiffracta H.J.Wei & Z.Y.Zuo
- Dryopteris × subreflexipinna M.Ogata
- Dryopteris × sugino-takaoi Sa.Kurata

=== T ===
- Dryopteris × takachihoensis Miyam.
- Dryopteris × telesii Fraser-Jenk.
- Dryopteris × tetsu-yamanakae Sa.Kurata
- Dryopteris × tiantangzhaiensis H.J.Wei & B.Chen
- Dryopteris × tokudae Sugim.
- Dryopteris × triploidea Wherry

=== U, V ===
- Dryopteris × uliginosa (A.Braun ex Döll) Kuntze ex Druce
- Dryopteris × uralensis Gureeva & Moczalov
- Dryopteris × urbachensis S.Jess. & Bujnoch
- Dryopteris × vidae Fraser-Jenk. & Gibby

=== W, X, Y, Z ===
- Dryopteris × watanabei Sa.Kurata
- Dryopteris × wechteriana Fraser-Jenk.
- Dryopteris × woynarii Rothm.
- Dryopteris × yamashitae Sa.Kurata
- Dryopteris × yuyamae Sa.Kurata
- Dryopteris × zygoparentalis Fraser-Jenk
