= Dryopteris × leedsii =

Scientific classification
- Kingdom: Plantae
- Clade: Tracheophytes
- Division: Polypodiophyta
- Class: Polypodiopsida
- Order: Polypodiales
- Suborder: Polypodiineae
- Family: Dryopteridaceae
- Genus: Dryopteris
- Species: D. × leedsii

Binomial name
- Dryopteris × leedsii Wherry

Hybrid fern

Dryopteris × leedsii (Leeds' wood fern) is a hybrid fern native to eastern North America. It is the sterile offspring of the log fern (D. celsa) and the marginal wood fern (D. marginalis).

== Taxonomy ==
The first known collection of Leeds' wood fern was in 1928 by E. J. Palmer near Shirley, Arkansas. The "Palmer Dryopteris" was frequently recognized as having some affinity to D. celsa, but its precise identy remained a mystery for many years. In 1931, Arthur N. Leeds discovered a large colony of hybrid wood ferns below the Conowingo Dam in Harford County, Maryland. It was initially thought to be the hybrid between Goldie's wood fern (D. goldieana) and D. marginalis. It was described as such and given the name D. × leedsii in 1942 by Edgar T. Wherry. The type specimen is a 1931 collection by Leeds deposited at the Academy of Natural Sciences of Philadelphia.

Further confusion was generated when samples gathered at the type site in 1954 were sent to Stanley Walker for chromosome counts, and proved to be a mixture of abortive-spored hybrids and fertile tetraploids. The fertile plants were taken to be allopolyploids formed by chromosome doubling of the hybrid, and described as Dryopteris wherryi in 1960. However, further work by Walker revealed that the hybrids, initially thought to be diploid, appeared to be largely triploid, which would not be expected of a D. goldieana and D. marginalis. (Note: Both D. goldieana and D. marginalis are diploid, so hybrids of a cross between them would normally be diploid, with a set of chromosomes from each species.) Furthermore, lack of chromosome pairing after artificial backcrossing suggested that D. wherryi was not an allopolyploid derived from D. marginalis. (Note: If half of the D. wherryi genome was recently derived from D. marginalis, those chromosomes would be expected to pair up during meiosis in a hybrid between the two.)

In 1963, Herb Wagner suggested that D. × leedsii was probably the triploid hybrid of D. marginalis and D. celsa (an allotetraploid) rather than D. goldieana on the basis of studies done with Wherry at the type locality. Wagner and his wife Florence also found a new station for the hybrid in Monroe County, New York in 1964. The Wagners concluded that the specimens described as "D. wherryi" were in fact D. celsa and parents to D. × leedsii, and described the true hybrid of D. goldieana and D. marginalis, from other locales, as D. × neowherryii. The hybrid was subsequently found in Pennsylvania, and the "Palmer Dryopteris" was rediscovered by Carl Taylor and Delzie Demaree in 1974 and confirmed to be D. × leedsii.

== Distribution and habitat ==
The parents of Dryopteris × leedsii overlap broadly in range (if not habitat) in the eastern United States. The hybrid is known from New York, New Jersey, Pennsylvania, Maryland, and Virginia, and disjunctly in Arkansas.

== Notes and references ==
=== Works cited ===
- Crane, Fern Ward (1960). "A key to American Dryopteris species based on characters of the perispore". American Fern Journal. 50 (4): 270–275. Bibcode:1960AmFJ...50..270C. doi:10.2307/1545120. JSTOR 1545120.
- Kartesz, John T. (2014). "Dryopteris". Biota of North America Program.
- Wagner, W. H. Jr. (1963). "Pteridophytes of the Mountain Lake area, Giles County, Virginia". Castanea. 28 (4): 113–150. JSTOR 4032179.
- NatureServe (October 3, 2025). "Dryopteris x leedsii". NatureServe Explorer. Arlington, Virginia.
- Wagner, Warren H.; Taylor, W. Carl (1976). "Dryopteris × leedsii and its westernmost station". SIDA, Contributions to Botany. 6 (3): 224–234.
- Wagner, W. H. Jr.; Wagner, F. S. (1965). "Rochester area log ferns (Dryopteris celsa) and their hybrids" (PDF). Proceeding of the Rochester Academy of Science. 11 (2): 57–104.
- Wagner, W. H. Jr.; Wagner, Florence S. (1966). "Pteridophytes of the Mountain Lake area, Giles Co., Virginia: biosystematic studies, 1964-65". Castanea. 31 (2): 121–140. JSTOR 4032143.
- Walker, S. (1959). "Cytotaxonomic studies of some American species of Dryopteris". American Fern Journal. 49 (3): 104–112. Bibcode:1959AmFJ...49..104W. doi:10.2307/1545706. JSTOR 1545706.
- Walker, Stanley (1962). "The problem of Dryopteris leedsii". American Journal of Botany. 49 (9): 971–974. doi:10.2307/2439208. JSTOR 2439208.
- Wherry, Edgar T. (1942). "A woodfern hybrid deserves a name". Bartonia. 21: 1–2.
