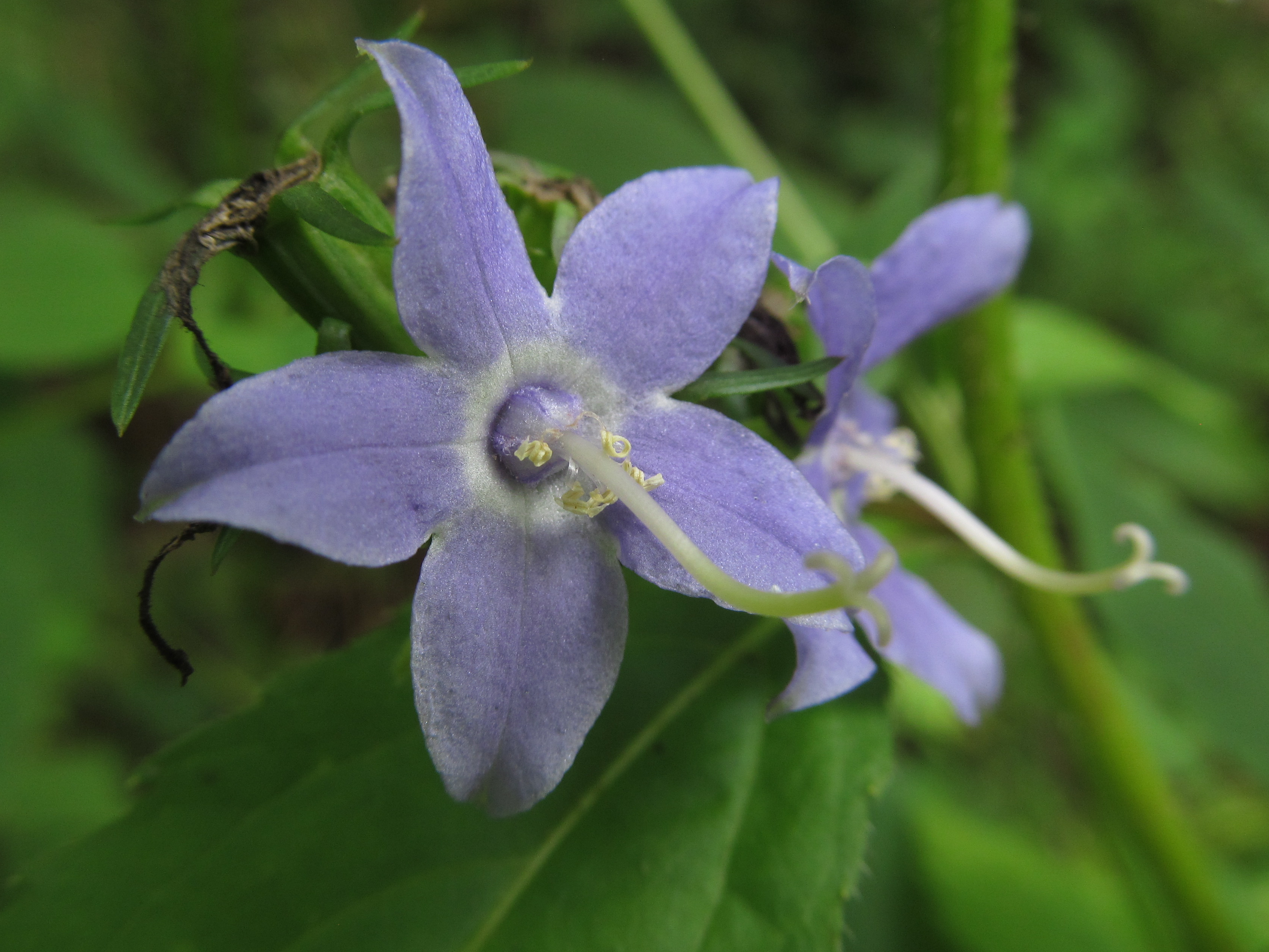

Conservation status
- Secure (NatureServe)

Scientific classification
- Kingdom: Plantae
- Clade: Tracheophytes
- Clade: Angiosperms
- Clade: Eudicots
- Clade: Asterids
- Order: Asterales
- Family: Campanulaceae
- Genus: Campanula
- Species: C. americana

Binomial name
- Campanula americana L.

Synonyms
- Synonymy: Campanulastrum americanum (L.) Small; Campanula acuminata Michx.; Campanula asteroides Lam.; Campanula declinata Moench; Campanula illinoensis Fresen.; Campanula nitida Aiton; Campanula obliqua Jacq.; Campanula pauciflora Lam. ex Steud. 1840 not Desf. 1833; Campanula planiflora Lam.; Campanula subulata P.Beauv. ex A.DC.; Phyteuma americanum Hill; Specularia americana (L.) Morgan ex J. James

= Campanula americana =

American bellflower

Species of flowering plant in the bellflower family

Campanula americana, the American bellflower, or tall bellflower, is an herbaceous wildflower and a member of the Campanulaceae family. Common binomial synonyms are Campanulastrum americana and Campanulastrum americanum. American bellflowers are native to the Eastern United States and Canada, often found growing along stream banks and woods. They bloom in the summer months with light blue to purple flowers. American bellflowers can be annual or biennial plants, depending on the season of germination.

== Description ==
=== Morphology ===
A large central flower stem shoots up from a basal rosette, which is a circular arrangement of leaves. Flowers grow off short stems connected to the central stalk, known as a raceme. The plant's overall height ranges from 3 to 6 feet (0.91 to 1.83 m). The central stem is light green, slightly grooved, and hairy. The primary root system is a taproot. It has alternate leaves 3–6 inches (7.6–15.2 cm) in length, that are lance-shaped to ovate-elliptic in shape, with rough/toothed edges. Leaves taper towards the soil and on upper stems. The top side of the leaf is rough.

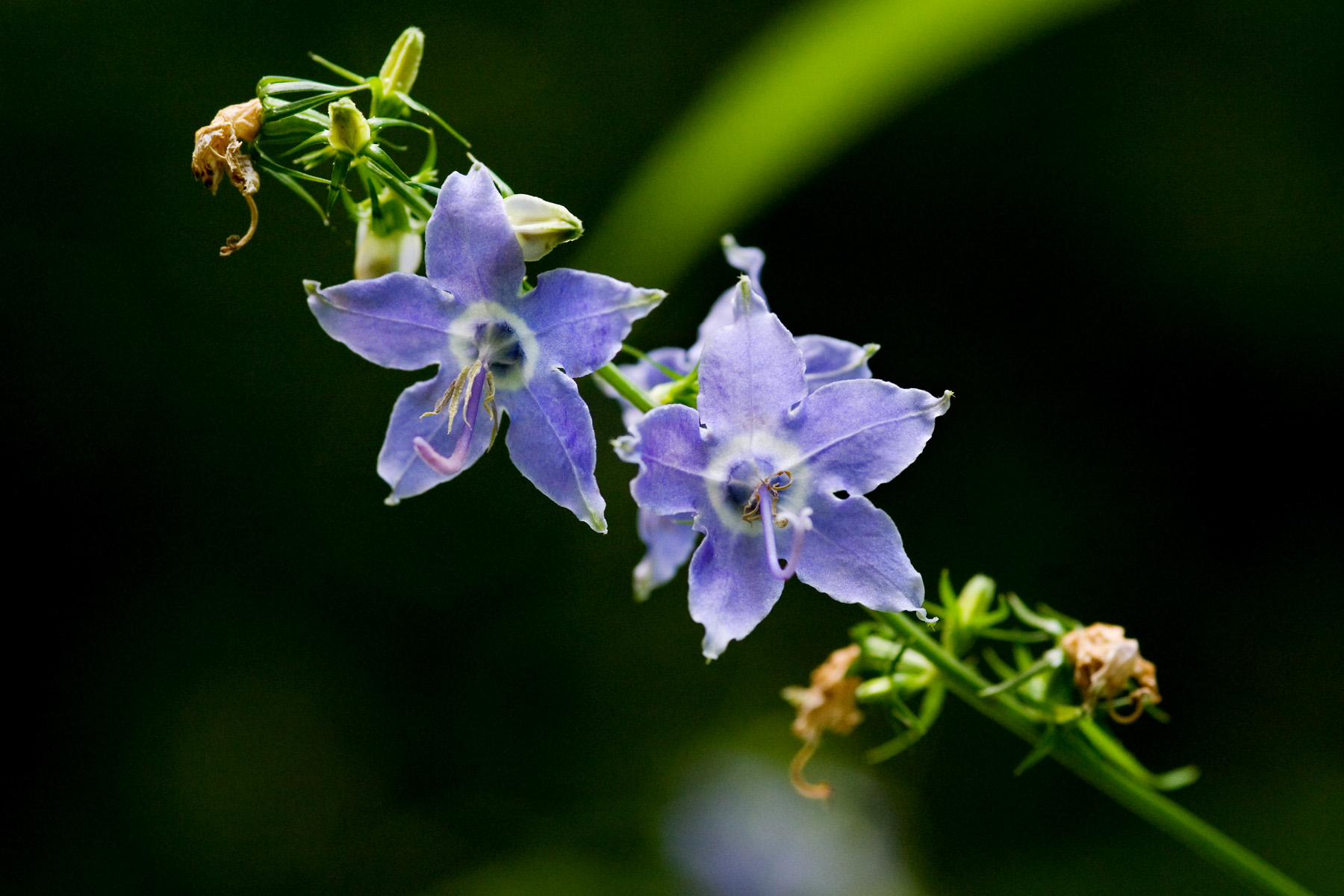
American bellflower flowers growing off of the central stalk

American bellflower flowers range in color from light blue to violet with a pale white ring at the throat of the flower. The flowers primarily bloom in the summer months of June, July and August. It is an unusual bellflower in that its flowers are flat, rather than its namesake bell shape. Flowers are approximately 1 inch (2.5 cm) across and can occur singly or in clusters. Flowers are radially symmetrical with 4–5 petals, which have ruffled edges and a pointed tip. Its pistils have a recurved style and a three lobed anther and each flower has 5 stamen, 5 petals, and 5 sepals. The ovaries develop into 5 angled flat-topped seed pods.

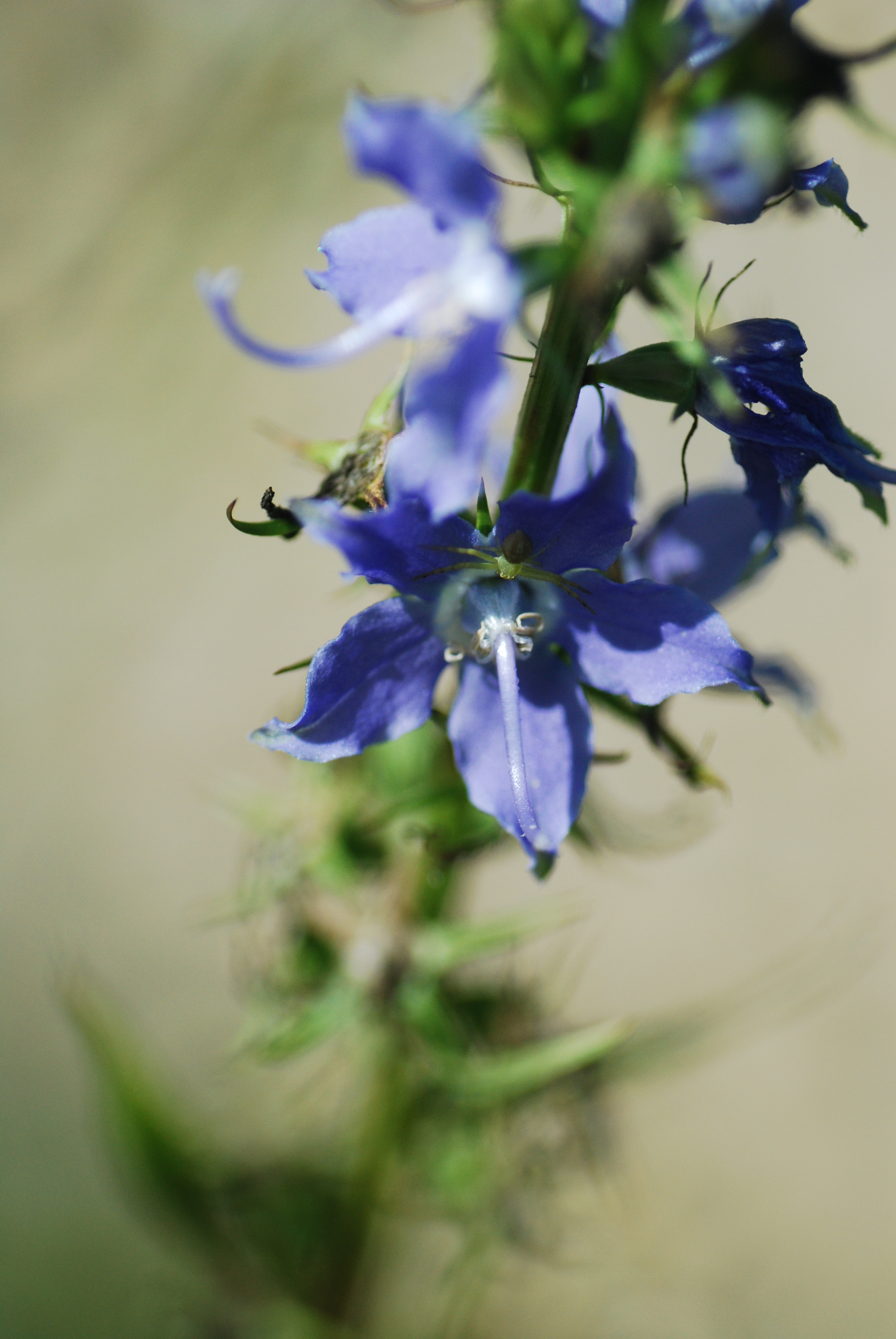
American bellflower

=== Reproduction and Life History ===
The American bellflower is self-compatible and exhibits sequential hermaphroditism as a protandrous plant. Mating strategies are plastic, meaning they can adapt with changes in the environment, and dependent on pollinator abundance. When there are pollinators present in substantial numbers, the American bellflower reproduces via out-crossing, a reproduction strategy of breeding between different individuals. When there are low numbers of pollinators visiting, the plants are able to self-pollinate.

Pollen ranges in color from dark purple to light tan.

The fruiting bodies are capsules, displayed from August to March, and contain many seeds. The seeds are oblong, with a pebbled surface, and a winged margin. Seeds are typically 1.3–1.6 mm long and 1.5–1.7 mm wide. The seeds of the American bellflower are not usually specifically predated upon. American bellflower seeds are light and small, suitable for their main form of dispersal by water. It has been put forth that ants may be another mode of seed dispersal.

The amount of light and nutrients the maternal plant receives influences their offspring's germination timing. This germination timing from the maternal tissue in turn informs the life history strategy of the American bellflower, as it controls if the offspring will be an annual or biennial plant. Seeds that germinate in the fall produce annual plants and spring-germinating seeds produce biennial plants. Binneal plants produce a basal rosette in the first year, and bloom in the second year from a tall stalk that grows from the basal rosette.

== Taxonomy ==
Carl Linnaeus proposed the name Campanula americana in 1753.

Campanula is derived from the Latin word campana, which translates to "little bell" in reference to the typical bell-shaped flower of the genus. However, the American bellflower is an exception in its genus with its flat rather than bell shaped flower. With this morphological difference, a new genus titled Campanulastrum has been proposed for the American bellflower. Some authorities, including the USDA PLANTS database, consider the name Campanulastrum americanum to be the accepted name for this species. The name Campanulastrum americana is used as another synonym for the American bellflower.

The species name of americana refers to the habitat range of America.

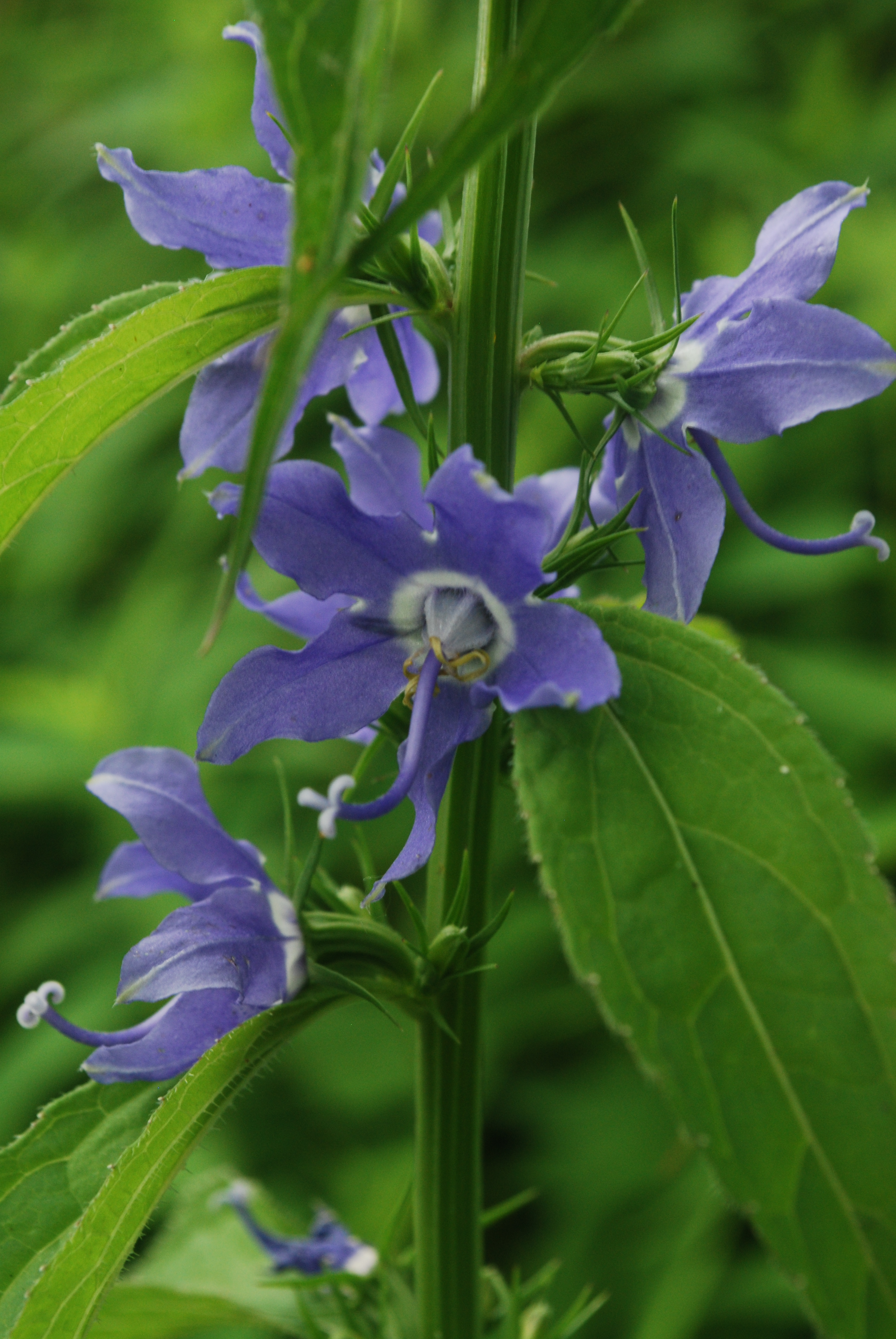
Campanula americana

== Distribution and habitat ==
American bellflowers are native to the Eastern United States, with their habitat clustered latitudinally along the Mississippi. American bellflowers grow from the Great Lakes region in southern Ontario south to Florida and from the Dakotas east to New York. The species is found in the US states of Alabama, Arkansas, Florida, Georgia, Iowa, Illinois, Indiana, Kansas, Kentucky, Louisiana, Maryland, Minnesota, Maine, Missouri, Mississippi, North Carolina, Nebraska, New Jersey, New York, Ohio, Oklahoma, Pennsylvania, South Carolina, South Dakota, Tennessee, Virginia, Wisconsin and West Virginia.

American bellflowers thrive in partial shade and rich loamy soil. They live in circumneutral soil, with a pH ranging from 6.8 to 7.2. American bellflowers grow along woodland edges, in open woods, shaded meadows, stream banks and ditches. Because of their wide range, information on elevation range is not available, but American bellflowers grow within Zones 4–8 of the USDA Hardiness Zone.

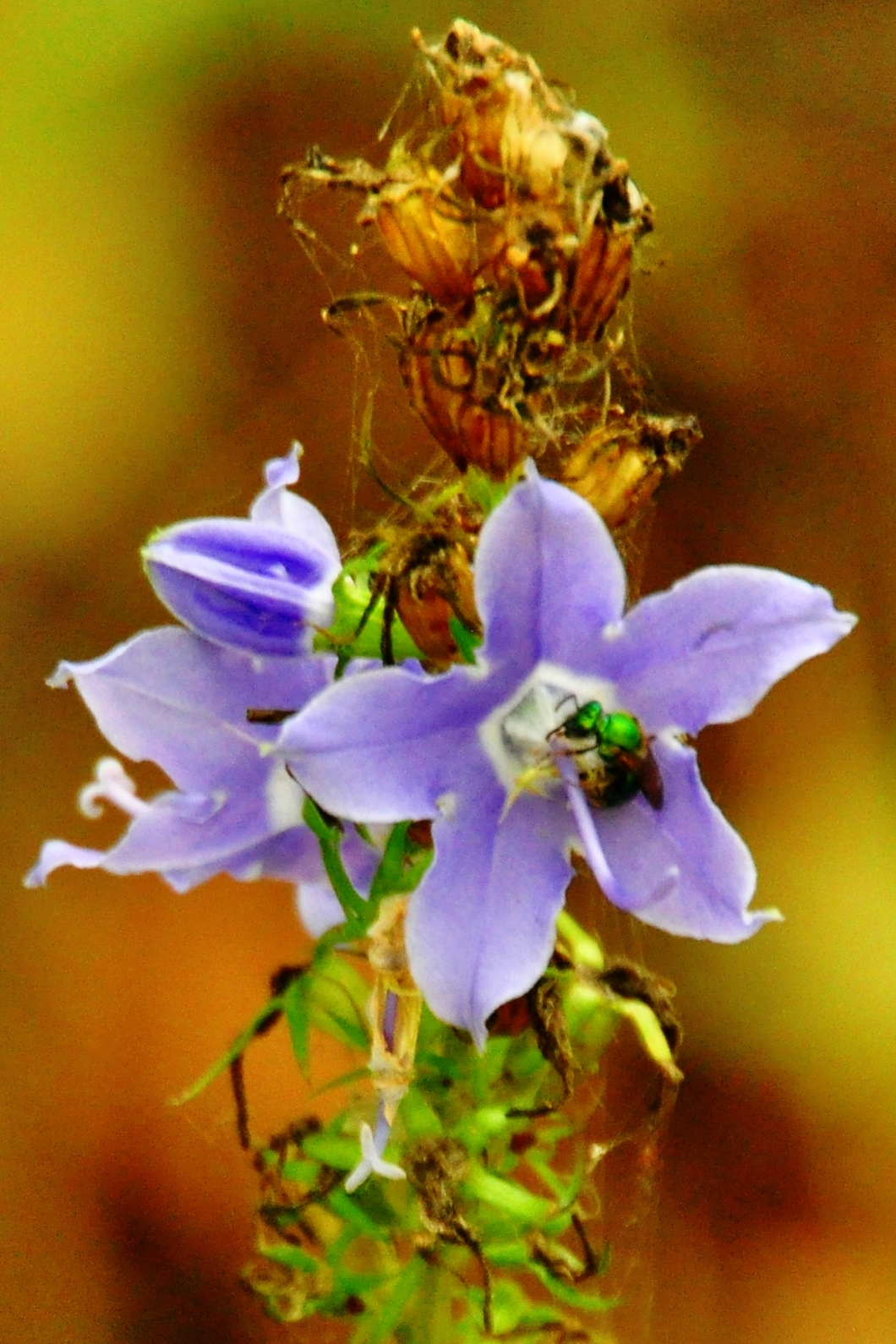
Halictid bee pollinating an American bellflower

=== Ecology ===
Long-tongued bees, including Bombus spp. and Megachilidae, are the primary pollinators of American bellflowers. This includes Megachile campanulae, which exclusively pollinates flowers in the genus Campanula. Halictid bees, butterflies, hummingbirds and skippers also act as pollinators to this species.

There are no significant pest threats towards the American bellflower, or issues with diseases. American bellflower are sometimes predated upon by slugs, snails, aphids and white-tailed deer.

=== Conservation ===
While the American bellflower is considered to be secure overall on NatureServe's conservation assessment, it is critically imperiled in Louisiana, New York and South Carolina and vulnerable in Mississippi. It is apparently secure in Georgia, Kansas, North Carolina, Virginia and Canada and secure in Indiana, Iowa, Kentucky, Pennsylvania and West Virginia. The rest of the US states do not have a conservation status for the American bellflower.

Campanula rapunculoides, or the creeping bellflower, is an invasive species from Europe and outcompetes the native American bellflower by choking its root systems.

American bellflowers attract a large number of native bees and are of conservational interest for these pollinators.

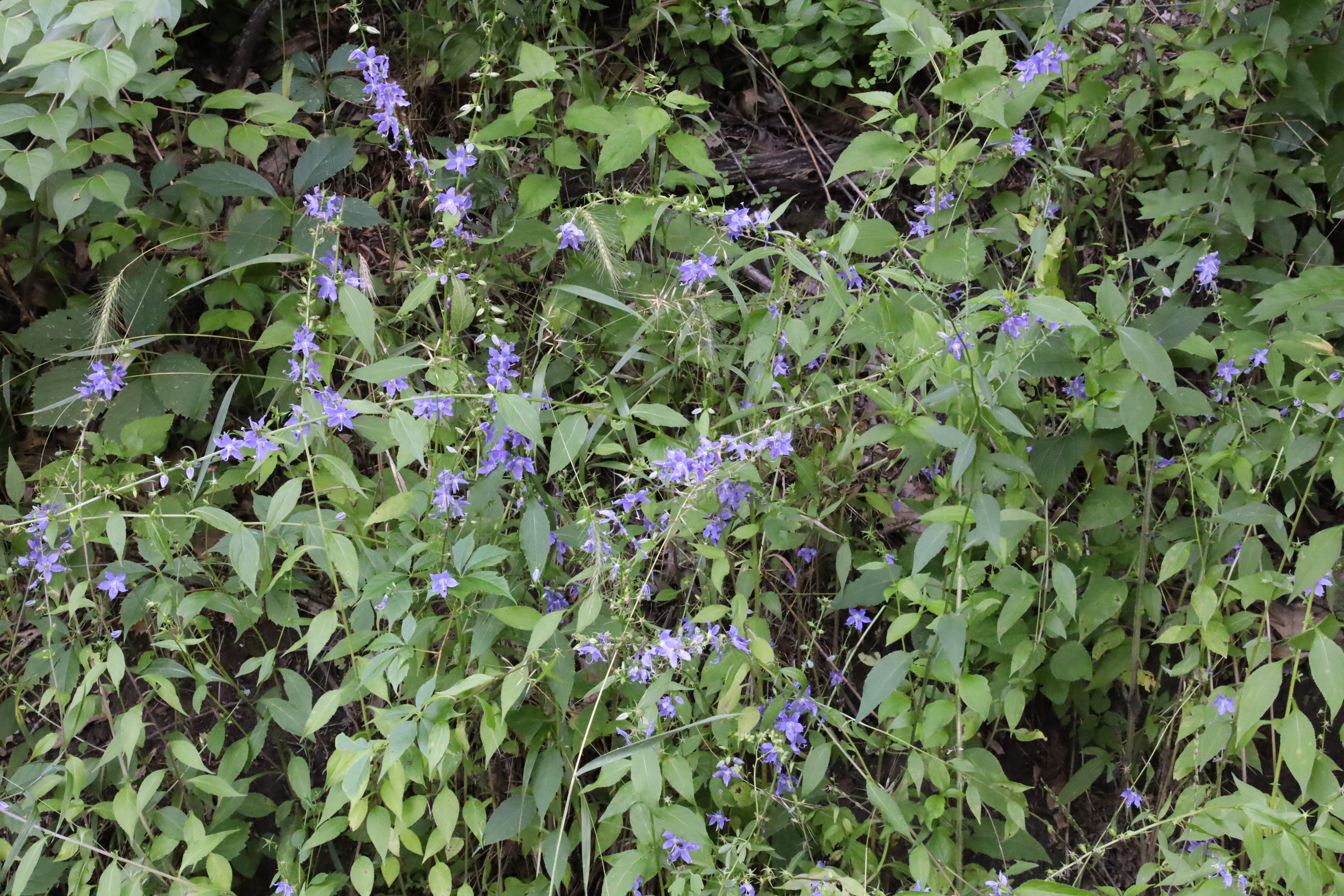
Mass grouping of American bellflowers

== Cultivation and uses ==
American bellflowers are popular for decorative landscaping purposes, and thrive in mass groupings. American bellflowers grow within Zones 4–8 of the USDA Hardiness Zone.

Native American groups have used different parts of the American Bellflower for respiratory cures. Specifically, the Haudenosaunee group treated whooping cough with a root infusion. The Meskwaki treated coughing and tuberculosis with the leaves.
