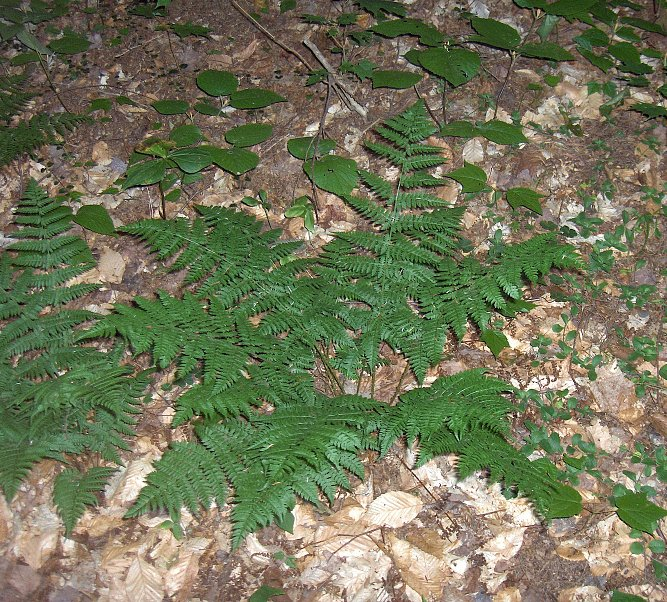

Conservation status
- Secure (NatureServe)

Scientific classification
- Kingdom: Plantae
- Clade: Tracheophytes
- Division: Polypodiophyta
- Class: Polypodiopsida
- Order: Polypodiales
- Suborder: Polypodiineae
- Family: Dryopteridaceae
- Genus: Dryopteris
- Species: D. intermedia

Binomial name
- Dryopteris intermedia (Muhl. ex Willd.) A.Gray

Synonyms
- Polypodium intermedium (1810); Aspidium americanum (1878); Aspidium intermedium; Dryopteris austriaca var. intermedia; Dryopteris spinulosa var. concordiana; Dryopteris spinulosa var. intermedia (1893); Thelypteris spinulosa var. intermedia

= Dryopteris intermedia =

Species of wood fern

Dryopteris intermedia, the intermediate wood fern or evergreen wood fern, is a perennial, evergreen wood fern native to eastern North America. It is a diploid species, and is the parent of several species of hybrid origin, including Dryopteris carthusiana. Other common names for this species include intermediate shield fern, fancy wood fern, fancy fern, glandular wood fern, American shield fern and common wood fern.

This fern is often confused with several other wood fern species, including D. carthusiana, D. campyloptera, and D. expansa. It especially extensively shares the range of D. carthusiana, but the two may be distinguished by the innermost pinnule on the bottom side of the bottom pinna: this pinnule is longer than the adjacent pinnules in D. carthusiana, but shorter or even in D. intermedia.

== Description ==
Dryopteris intermedia is a perennial fern that grows to a size of about 40–90 cm (16–35 in) tall and 60–90 cm (24–35 in) wide. At its base, it consists of an underground rhizome from which grow the fronds of the plant in a spiral-like arrangement. Each frond consists of a stipe (stalk) that is covered in light-brown scales towards the base and short glandular hairs further up. The stipes generally measure between 1/4 to 1/3 the length of the frond and support a leaf blade that is lance-oblong in shape. The leaves themselves are bipinnately compound, meaning that they divide into leaflets called pinnae and sub-leaflets called pinnules. The pinnules of this species are lobed and toothed. Uniquely, the first pinnule closest to the stem on the lowest pinna is shorter than the second.

== Distribution and conservation ==
Dryopteris intermedia is native to most of eastern North America, ranging from Minnesota in the north-west and Newfoundland and Labrador in the north-east, down to Alabama in the south-west and South Carolina in the south-east. While globally secure, it is considered by NatureServe to be "critically imperiled" in the states of Iowa and Missouri which represent the western limit of its range, and "imperiled" in the states of Illinois and South Carolina as well as the region of Labrador. Similar ferns found in the Azores are often regarded as a subspecies (subsp. azorica) or as a different species (Dryopteris azorica).

== Habitat ==
Dryopteris intermedia grows in a variety of mesic habitats including forests, woodlands, ravines, swamp edges and rocky slopes.

== Cultivation ==
Dryopteris intermedia is cultivated as an ornamental plant in North America for gardens, especially natural gardens and shade gardens, as it is easy to grow in a range of environments and soils and does not spread much. Care needs to be taken when planting to ensure that the fern is placed in an area of part-shade or full-shade and that the soil remains moist, as it does not tolerate a lot of sun or dry soil.

== Hybrids ==
Several naturally occurring hybrids involving Dryopteris intermedia exist. These include:

- Dryopteris campyloptera × Dryopteris intermedia ("hybrid wood fern")
- Dryopteris intermedia × Dryopteris marginalis ("glandular marginal wood fern")
- Dryopteris ×boottii ("Boott's wood fern")
- Dryopteris ×triploidea ("triploid wood fern")
- Dryopteris ×dowellii ("Dowell's wood fern")
- Dryopteris goldieana × Dryopteris intermedia ("hybrid wood fern")

All of the hybrids listed above are sterile. One exception is the allotetraploid Dryopteris carthusiana (spinulose wood fern), which is said to originate from a hybridization of Dryopteris intermedia and an extinct fern dubbed Dryopteris "semicristata".

== Gallery ==
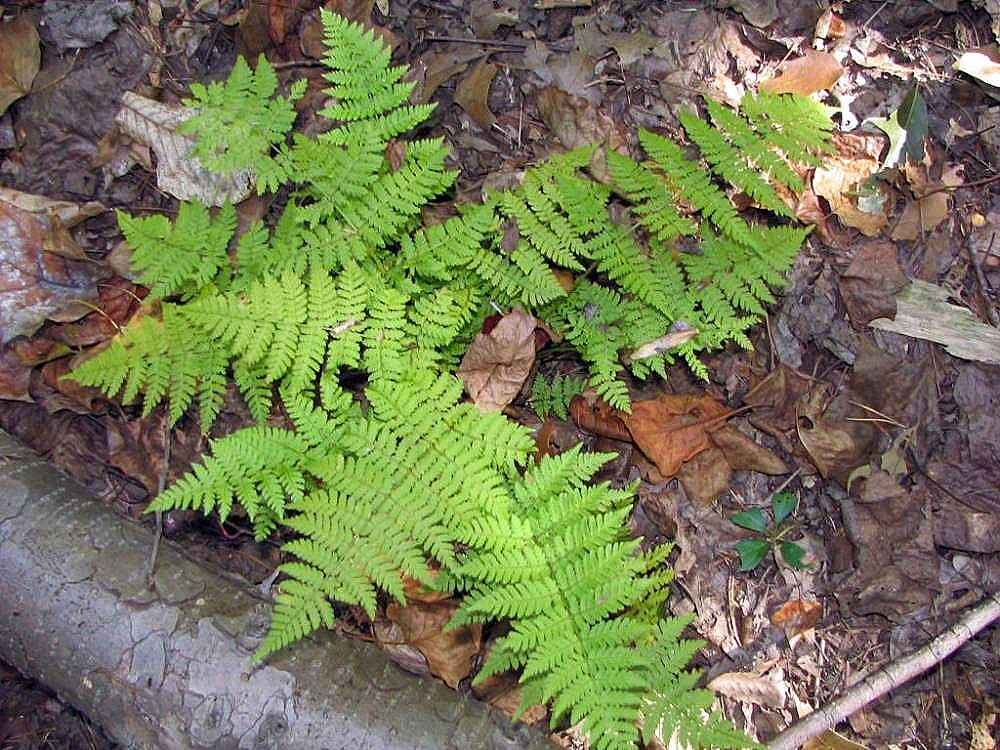
Dryopteris intermedia in Washington, D.C.

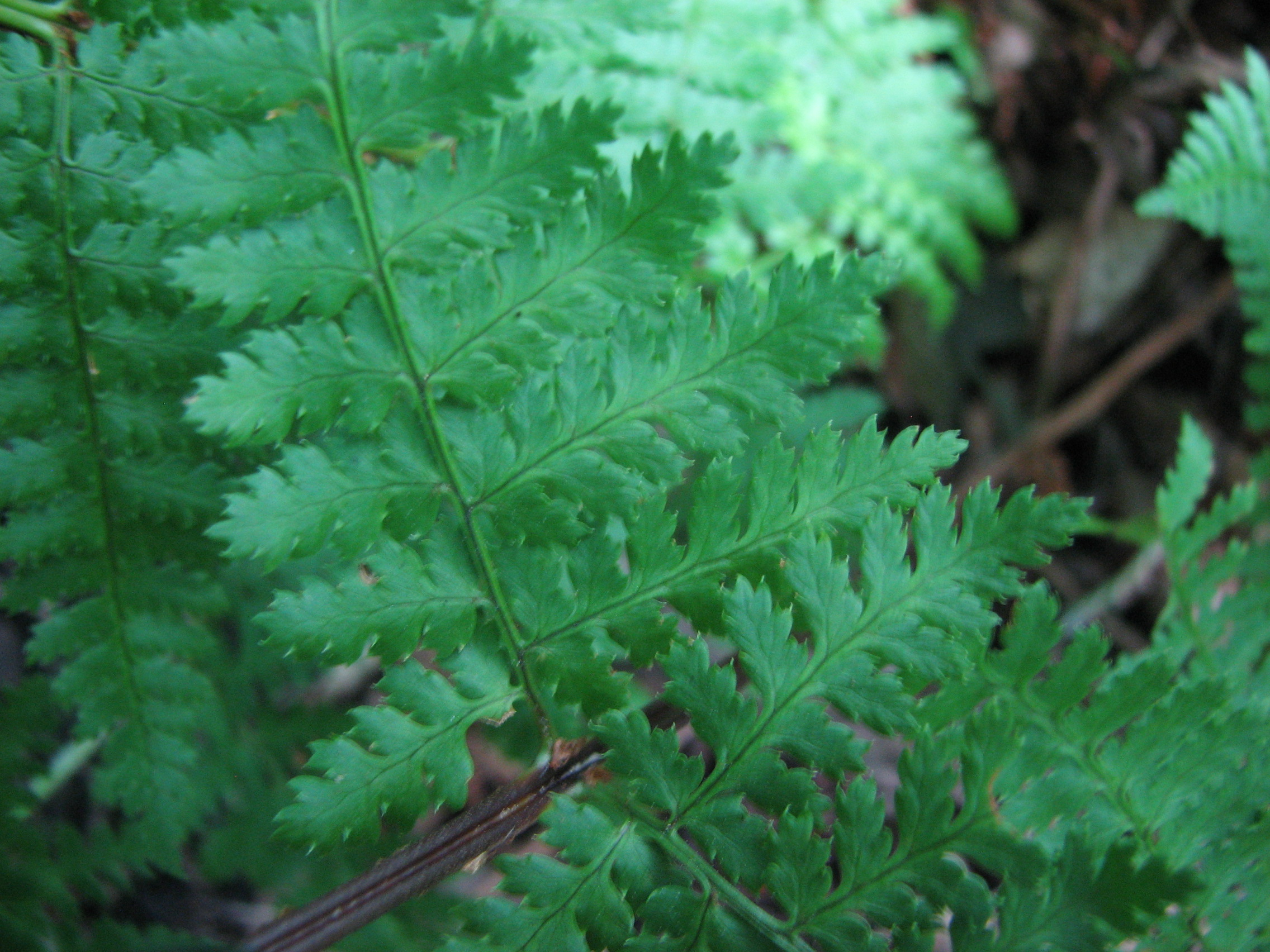
Characteristic toothed pinnules

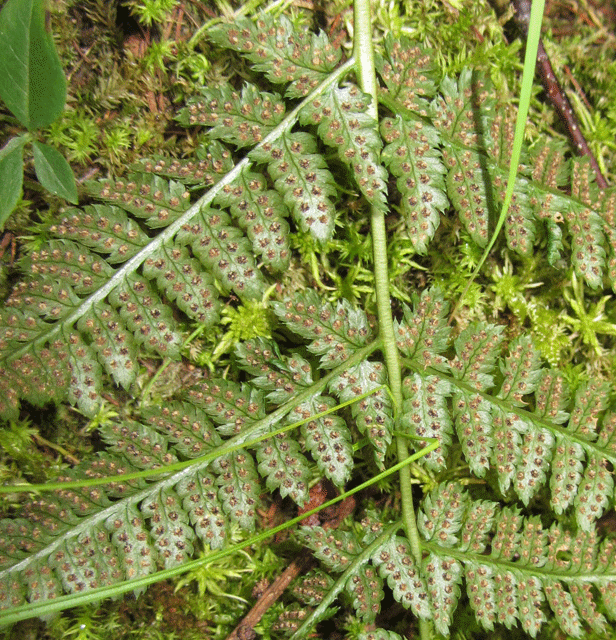
Sori on the underside of the fronds
