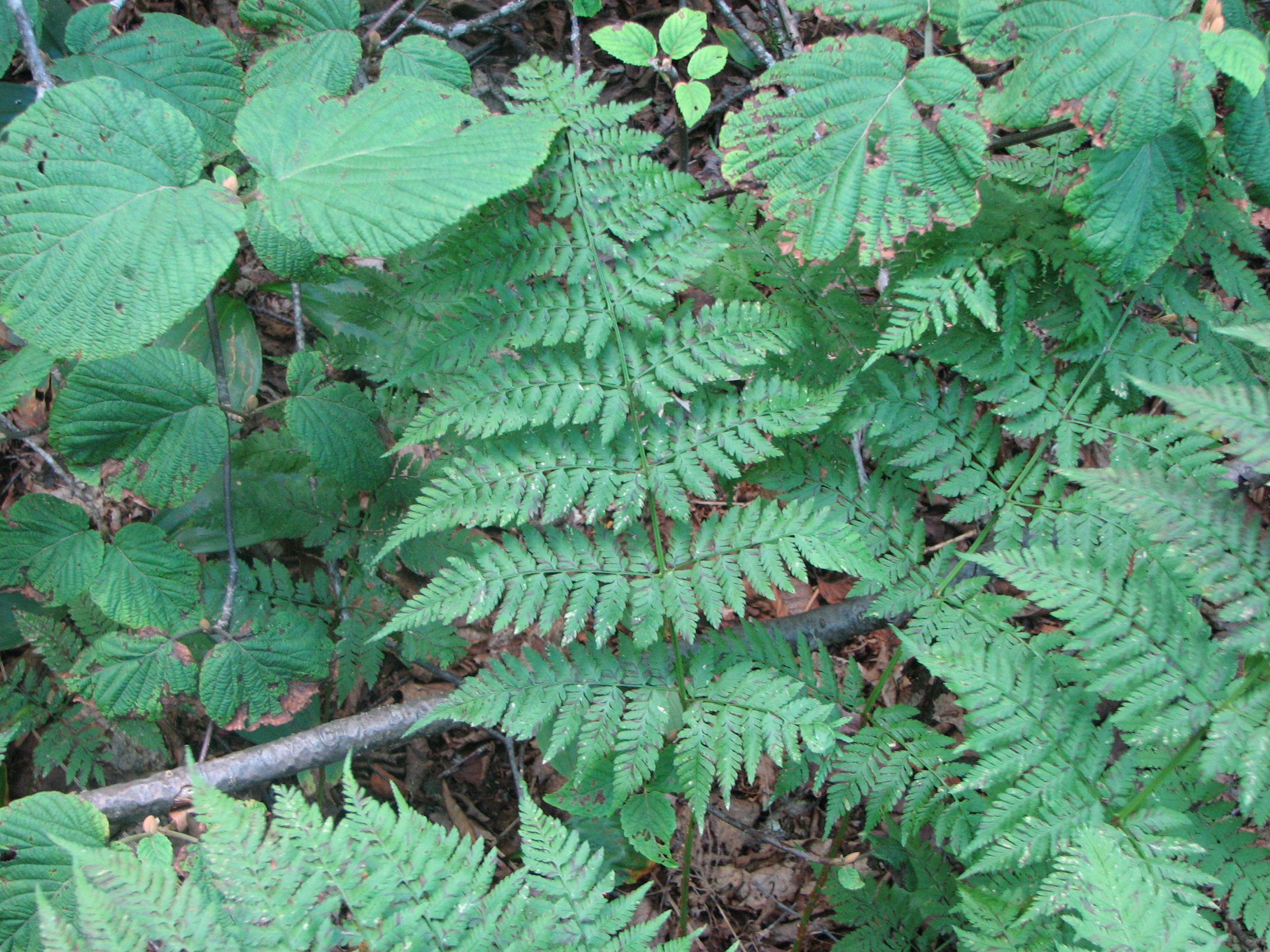

Conservation status
- Secure (NatureServe)

Scientific classification
- Kingdom: Plantae
- Clade: Tracheophytes
- Division: Polypodiophyta
- Class: Polypodiopsida
- Order: Polypodiales
- Suborder: Polypodiineae
- Family: Dryopteridaceae
- Genus: Dryopteris
- Species: D. campyloptera

Binomial name
- Dryopteris campyloptera (Kunze) Clarkson

Synonyms
- List: Aspidium campylopterum Kunze; Aspidium spinulosum var. concordianum (Davenp.) Eastman; Dryopteris austriaca Woynar; Dryopteris austriaca var. concordiana (Davenp.) C.V.Morton; Dryopteris dilatata var. americana (Fisch. ex Kuntze) Benedict; Dryopteris dilatata subsp. campyloptera (Clarkson) C.V.Morton; Dryopteris intermedia var. concordiana (Davenp.) M.Broun; Dryopteris intermedia f. concordiana (Davenp.) Clute; Dryopteris spinulosa var. americana (Fisch. ex Kuntze) Fernald; Dryopteris spinulosa var. concordiana (Davenp.) Eastman; Filix spinulosa var. americana (Fisch. ex Kuntze) Farw.; Filix spinulosa var. concordiana (Davenp.) Farw.; Filix-mas rigida var. americana (Fisch. ex Kuntze) Farw.; Filix-mas spinulosa var. americana (Fisch. ex Kuntze) Farw.; Nephrodium spinulosum var. concordianum Davenp.; Thelypteris dilatata var. americana (Fisch. ex Kuntze) House; Thelypteris spinulosa var. americana (Fisch. ex Kuntze) Weath.; Thelypteris spinulosa var. concordiana (Davenp.) Weath.

= Dryopteris campyloptera =

Species of fern

Dryopteris campyloptera, also known as the mountain wood fern, is a large American fern of higher elevations and latitudes. It was formerly known as Dryopteris spinulosa var. americana. This species also has been mistakenly referred to as D. austriaca and D. dilatata.

A distinctive feature of this fern is that the bottom innermost pinnule on the basal pinnae spans approximately the first two top innermost pinnules on the same pinnae.

This fern is a tetraploid species of hybrid origin, the parents being Dryopteris intermedia and Dryopteris expansa. Phenotypologically, the fern greatly resembles the second parent.

In West Virginia, this species may only be found above 3800 feet elevation, but is a part of the normal flora in northern New England.
