= Delzie Demaree =

American botanist and plant collector

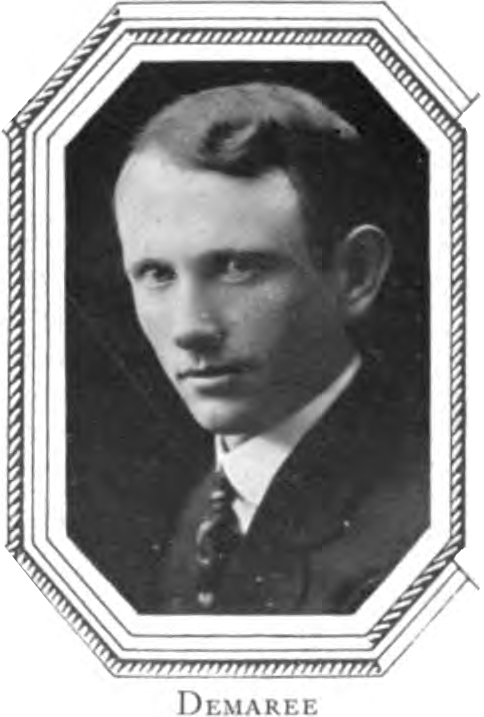
- Portrait of Delzie Demaree in 1920.
- Born: September 15, 1889; Benham, Indiana, United States
- Died: July 2, 1987 (aged 97); United States
- Scientific career
- Fields: Botany.

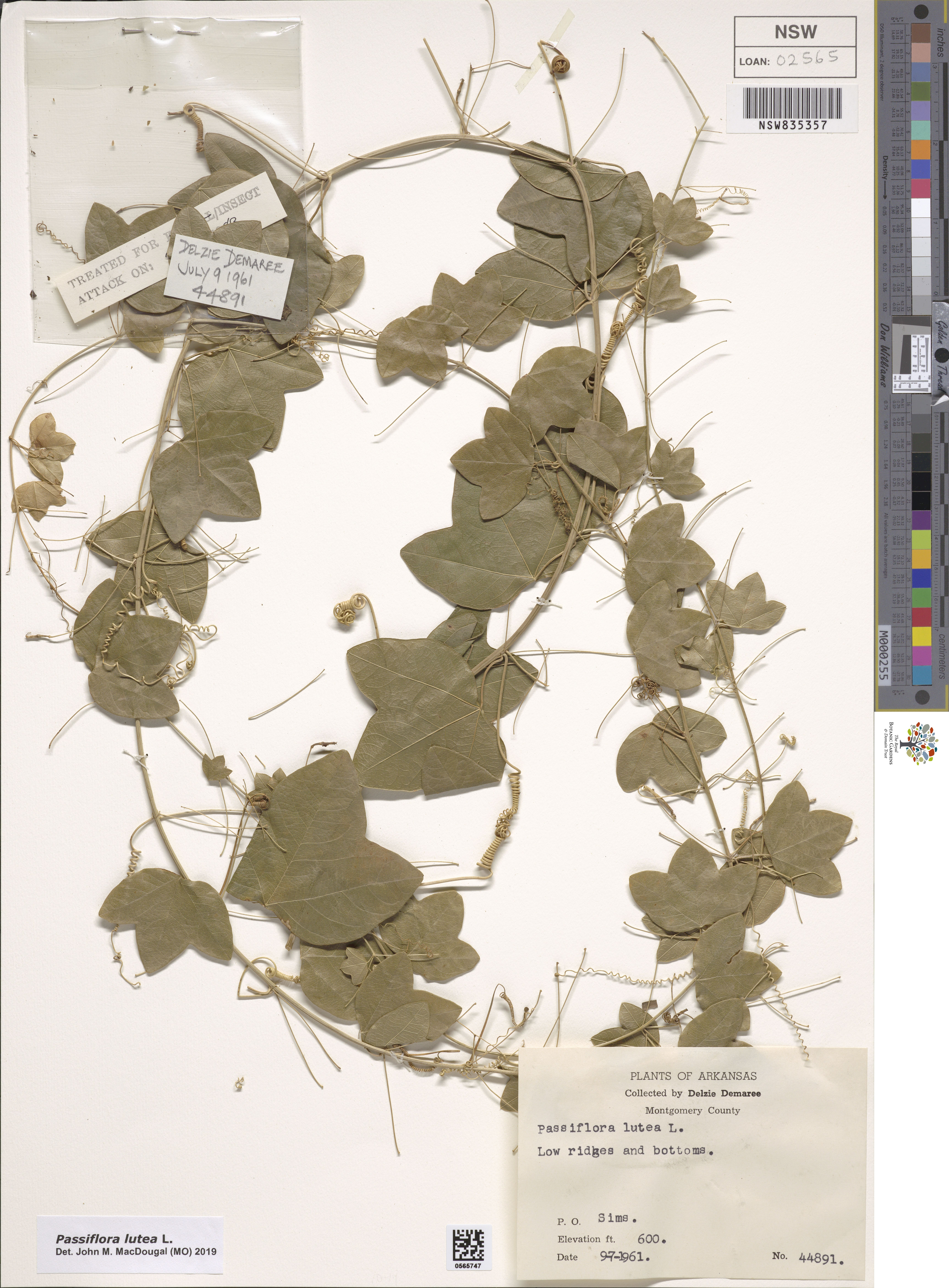
Herbarium specimen of Passiflora lutea, collected by Delzie Demaree in Arkansas, 1961.

Delzie Demaree (15 September 1889 – 2 July 1987) was an American botanist and plant collector. His place of death is reported as Bonham, Arkansas or Texas.

== Life ==
Demaree was born in Benham, in south-eastern Indiana. He attended the Central Normal College in Danville before serving as a member of the United States Marine Corps between 1917 and 1919. Demaree completed a Bachelor of Science degree majoring in botany in 1920. He started to concentrate on collecting botanical specimens in 1922, while teaching at Hendrix College Arkansas. Delzie completed his PhD at Stanford University in 1932 and continued to teach at various institutions, including Arkansas Agricultural and Mechanical College, the Gulf Coast Research Laboratory and Tulane University.

== Published major works ==
- Demaree, D. 1932. Plant responses to sawdust. Proc. Indiana Acad. Sci. 51:125-6.
- Demaree, D. 1932. Submerging experiments with Taxodium. Ecology. 12:258-262.
- Demaree, D. 1941. Noteworthy Arkansas plants. I. Proc. Ark. Acad. 1: 17–19.
- Demaree, D. 1943. A catalogue of the vascular plants of Arkansas. Taxodium 1(1):1-88.
- W. Carl Taylor and D. Demaree. 1979. Annotated list of the ferns and fern allies of Arkansas. Rhodora 81 (828) : 503–548.

== Legacy ==
The following plants, have been named in his honour:

=== Vascular plants ===
- Carya × demareei E.J.Palmer
- Coreopsis grandiflora f. demareei Sherff
- Draba corrugata var. demareei (Wiggins) C.L.Hitchc., and synonym Draba demareei Wiggins.
- Gaura demareei P.H.Raven & D.P.Greg.
- Oenothera demareei (P.H.Raven & D.P.Greg.) W.L.Wagner & Hoch
- Rosa demareei E.J.Palmer, a synonym of Rosa woodsii Lindl.
- Verbena demareei Moldenke, a synonym of Verbena bipinnatifida var. bipinnatifida.

== Botanical collections ==
The bulk of Demaree's plant collections (approximately 50,000 specimens) were held by the Southern Methodist University herbarium, out of the over 75,000 collection numbers that he recorded. Smaller collections are held in the United States including the University of Arkansas and University of North Carolina herbaria, and overseas including at the National Herbarium of Victoria Royal Botanic Gardens Victoria, the National Herbarium of New South Wales, and the Australian National Herbarium.
