= Dryopteris × neowherryi =

Scientific classification
- Kingdom: Plantae
- Clade: Tracheophytes
- Division: Polypodiophyta
- Class: Polypodiopsida
- Order: Polypodiales
- Suborder: Polypodiineae
- Family: Dryopteridaceae
- Genus: Dryopteris
- Species: D. × neowherryi

Binomial name
- Dryopteris × neowherryi W.H.Wagner

Dryopteris × neowherryi, commonly referred to as Wherry's wood fern, is a rare fern hybrid of Dryopteris goldieana and Dryopteris marginalis.
