= Circumneutral =

Soils with near neutral pH

Circumneutral is a descriptor for soils which have a pH that is close to neutral. Circumneutral soils have a pH between 6.5 and 7.5.

A soil’s pH affects whether minerals dissolve in the soil and how quickly they dissolve. This causes circumneutral soils to have unique chemical qualities.

Certain species prefer or only grow in circumneutral soils.
