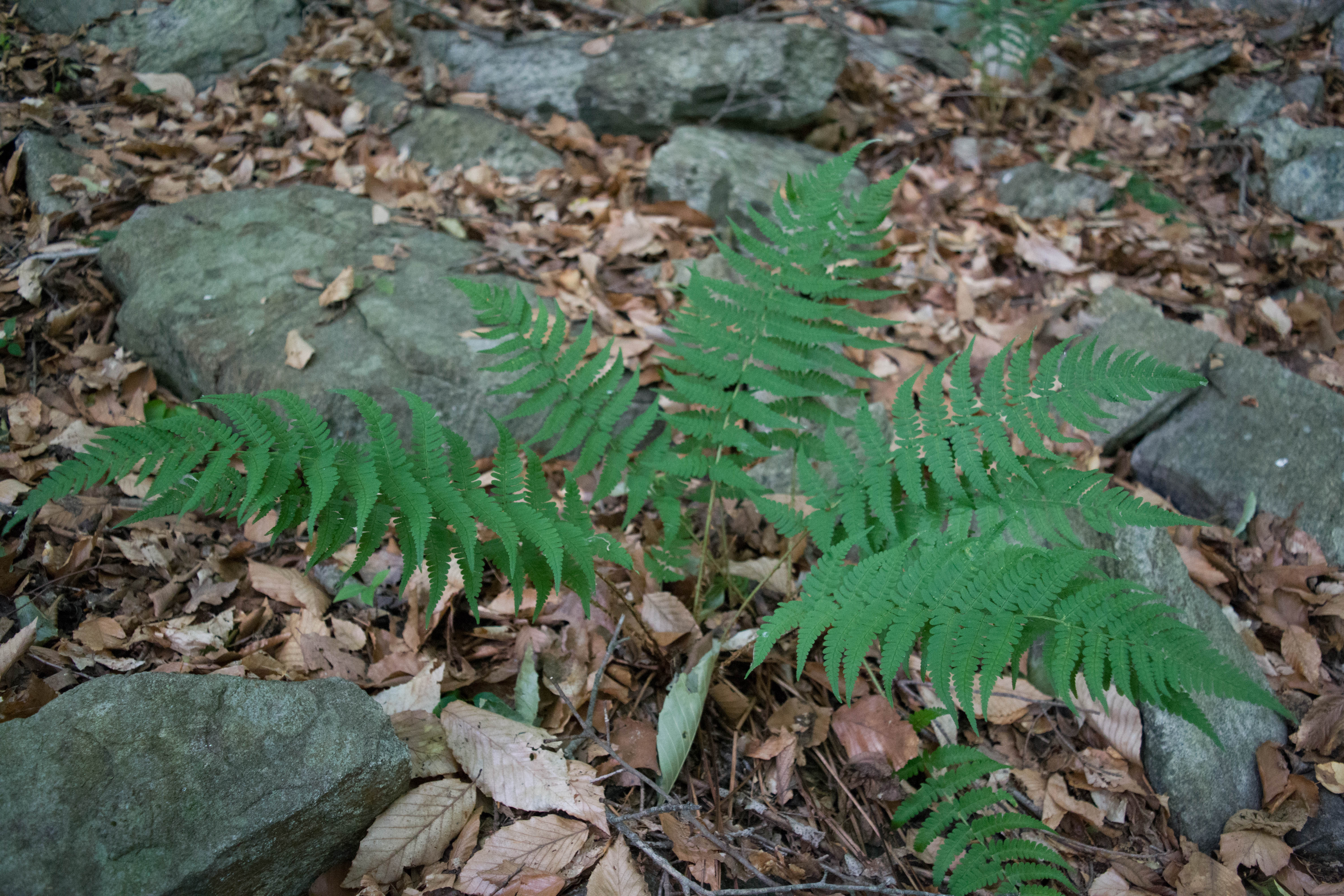
- Dryopteris marginalis growing in Bucks County Pennsylvania

Conservation status
- Secure (NatureServe)

Scientific classification
- Kingdom: Plantae
- Clade: Embryophytes
- Clade: Tracheophytes
- Division: Polypodiophyta
- Class: Polypodiopsida
- Order: Polypodiales
- Suborder: Polypodiineae
- Family: Dryopteridaceae
- Genus: Dryopteris
- Species: D. marginalis

Binomial name
- Dryopteris marginalis (L.) A. Gray
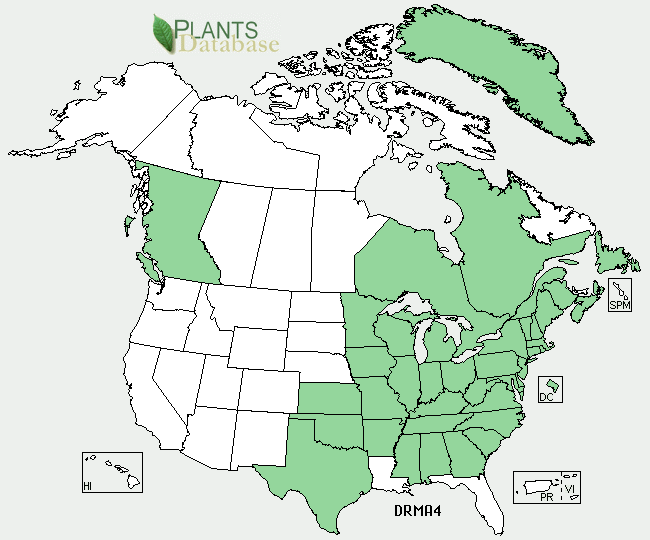
- Range within North America

Synonyms
- Aspidium marginale (L.) Sw.; Nephrodium marginale (L.) Michx.; Polypodium marginale L.

= Dryopteris marginalis =

Species of fern

Dryopteris marginalis, vernacularly known as the marginal shield fern or marginal wood fern, is a perennial species of fern found in damp shady areas throughout eastern North America, from Texas to Minnesota and Newfoundland. It favors moderately acid to circumneutral soils in cooler areas but is fairly drought-resistant once established. In the warmer parts of its range, it is most likely to be found on north-facing non-calcareous rock faces. It is common in many altitudes throughout its range, from high ledges to rocky slopes and stream banks. Marginal wood fern's name derives from the fact that the sori are located on the margins, or edges of the leaflets.

== Description ==
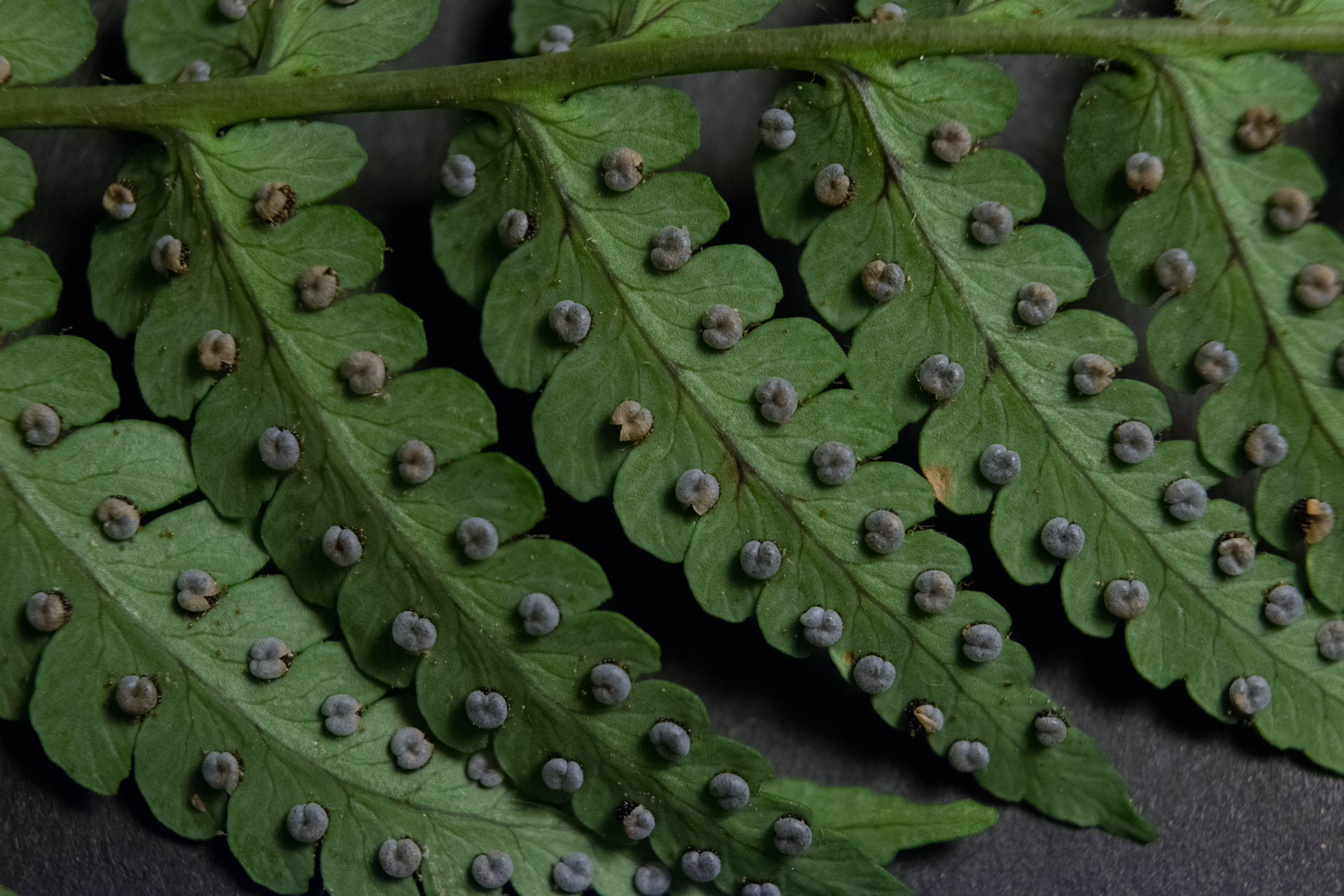
Dryopteris marginalis showing unripe sori placement on the edges of the leaves

Dryopteris marginalis is an evergreen fern throughout its range; along with Christmas fern (Polystichum acrostichoides) it is one of the few evergreen ferns. Marginal wood fern grows from a clump with a prominent central rootstock; this rootstock may be exposed and give this fern the appearance of being like a small tree fern. Often, the dead leaves will accumulate beneath the plant. The stipe, or stem which supports the leaf, is approximately 1/4 the length of the leaf and covered in bright golden brown scales. The stipe itself is grooved on the upward-facing side and dark red-brown at the base and becoming green further up the leaf.

The leaf is a dark blue-green and thick and leathery in texture. It grows 1–2 ft in height and approximately 6 in wide. Each leaf is broken up into leaflets which are arranged on either side of the main stalk. The tips of these leaflets are generally curved toward the tip of the leaf. These leaflets themselves are divided into subleaflets which are blunt-tipped and either serrated or lobed. The fertile leaflets (leaflets bearing sori and spores) are similar to the sterile leaflets in size and appearance. The round sori are located on the margins of the leaf tissue. Before the sori are ripe they start gray then they turn an interesting blue-violet color before finally turning brown when they are mature. The sori are covered in a kidney-shaped indusium which is smooth.

== Distribution and habitat ==
Dryopteris marginalis has a wide distribution in the northeastern US. It was found for the first time in Minnesota in 1981, and likely was part of the native flora for a long time but overlooked because of its rarity and its close resemblance to related species. It is listed as a threatened species in Minnesota, not so much because the species is currently threatened, but because there is only one population found on an east-facing bluff composed of sandstone that is capped with limestone. In other parts of its range it is found in woods, on talus-slopes, in rocky areas and walls, on wooded slopes and ravines, and at the edges of woods, streams and roads.

== Cultivation ==
Dryopteris marginalis is grown in gardens in part to full shade. It is an evergreen non-spreading fern that forms a vase-shaped clump of leathery, deeply cut fronds. It is used in shade gardens, rock gardens, and native plantings. There are no serious insect or disease problems that affect it, and it is winter hardy in USDA zones 3–8.

Dryopteris marginalis is known to form hybrids with 10 other species, and some of the hybrids are common; they can be identified by the malformed spores and sori which are not quite on the margins of the leaves.

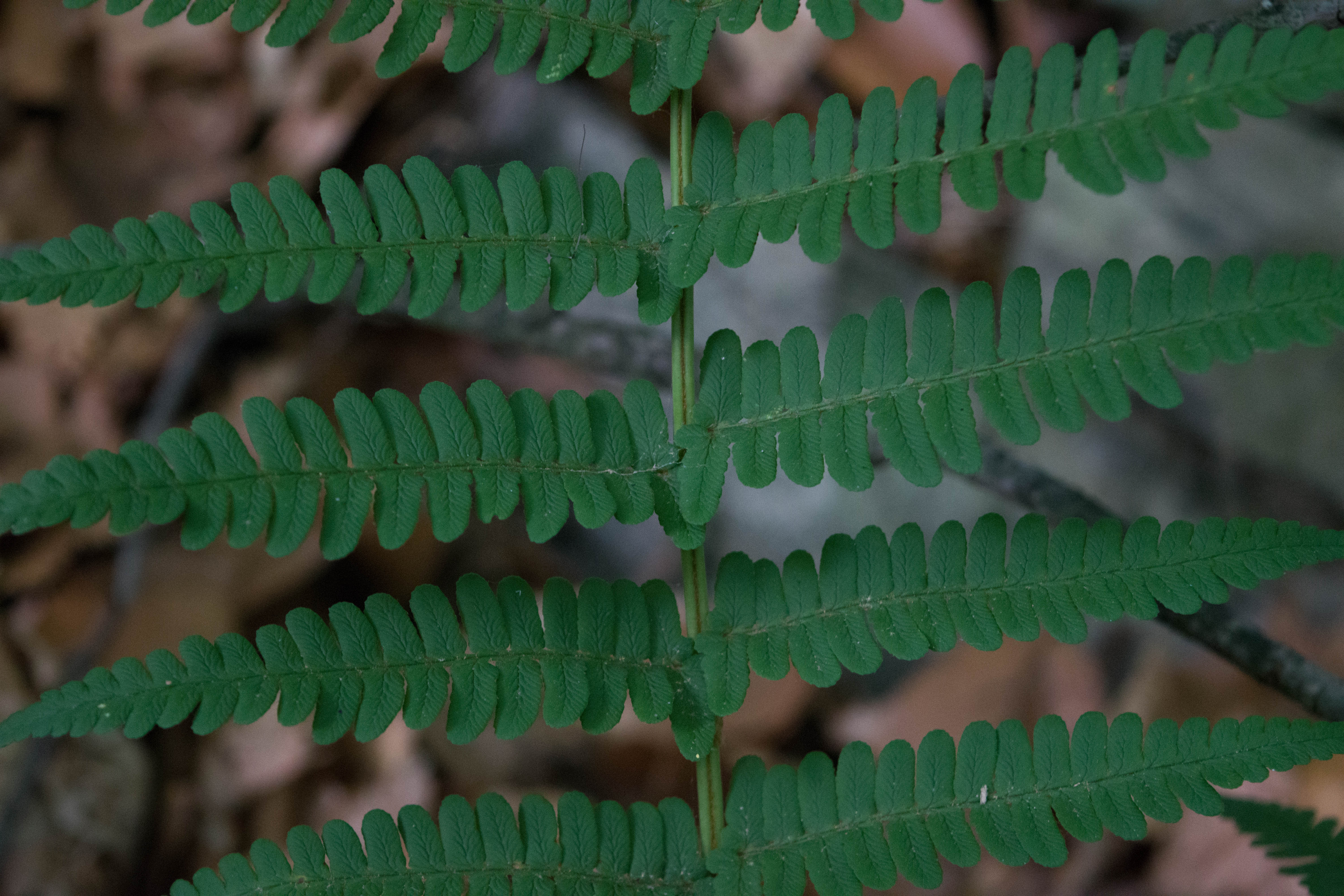
Showing leaflets

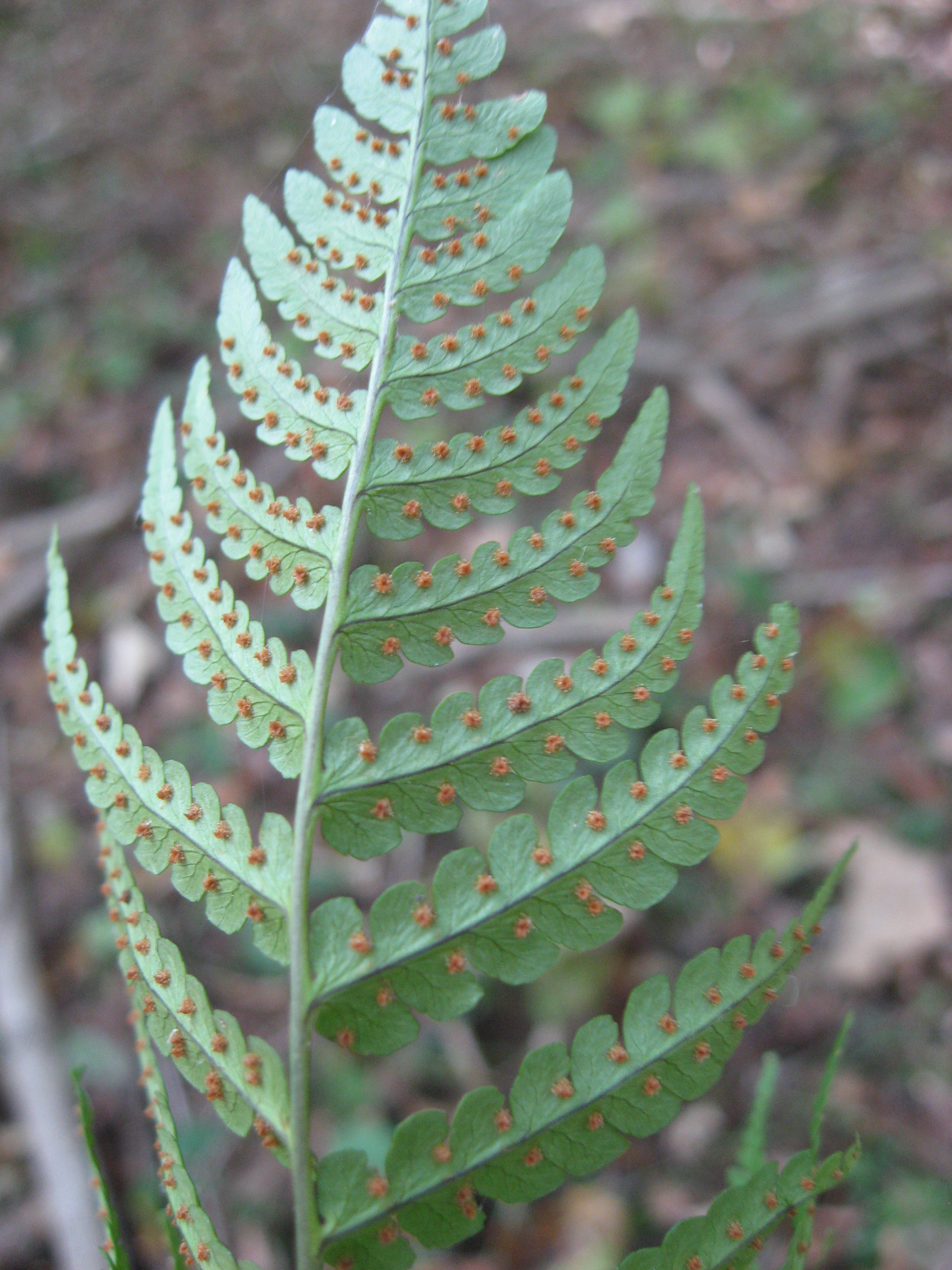
Showing sori

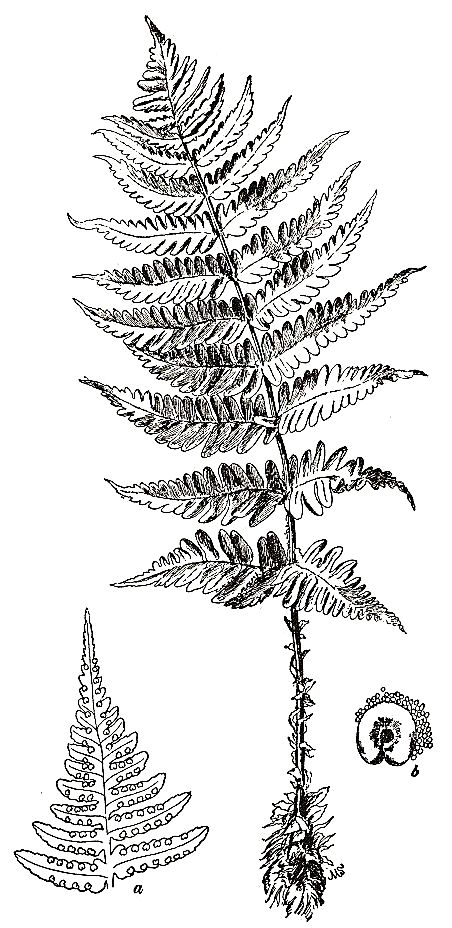
Botanical illustration

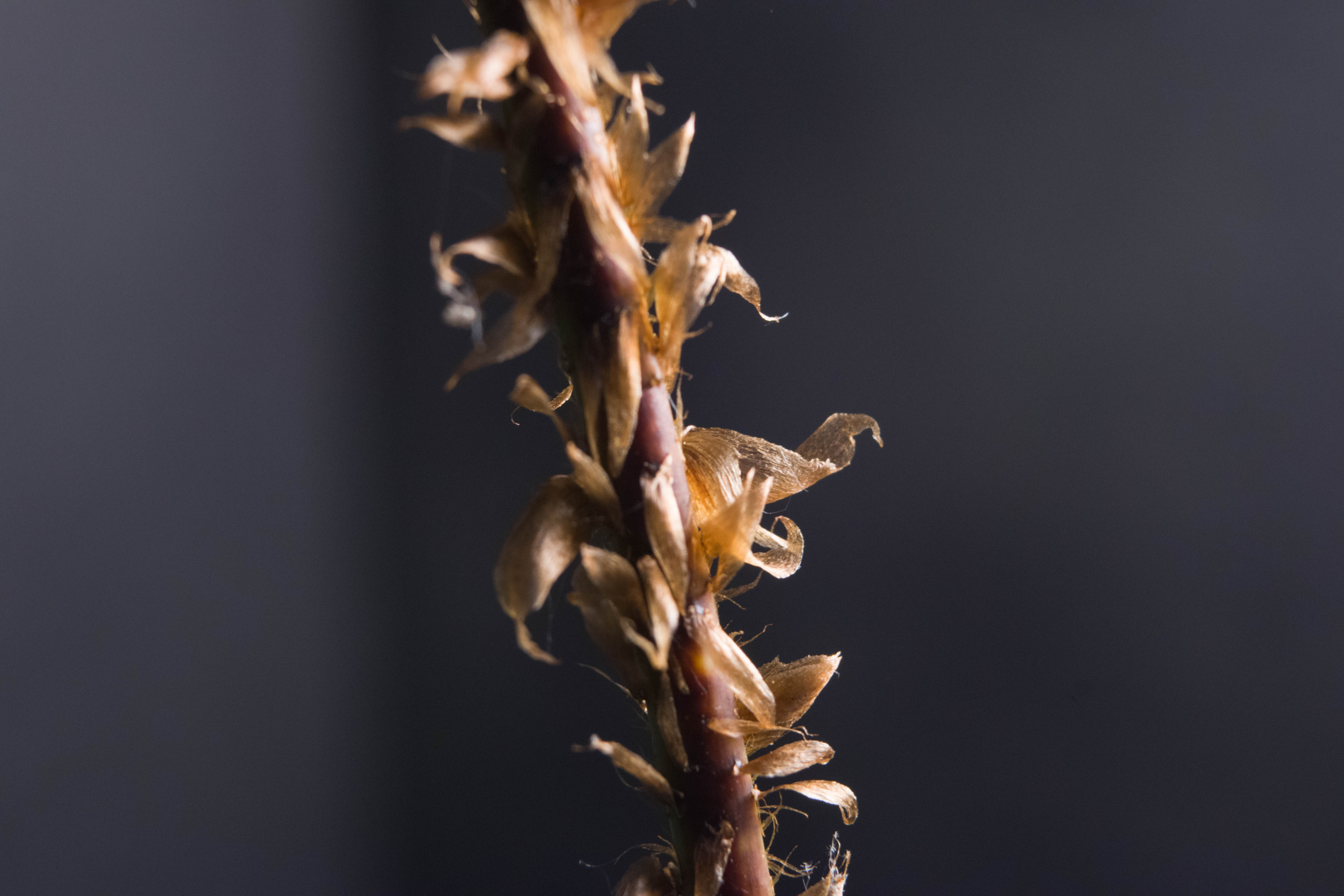
Scales on stalk
